= Timeline of the 2001 insurgency in Macedonia =

Combatants

- NLA — National Liberation Army
- ANA — Albanian National Army
- ARM — Macedonian Army
- MVR — Ministry of Interior
- NATO — North Atlantic Treaty Organization

Organizations

- ICTY — International Criminal Tribunal for the former Yugoslavia
- OSCE — Organization for Security and Co-operation in Europe
- HRW — Human Rights Watch

== Background ==
- 6 November 1992; Bit Pazar shooting, three Albanian civilians and one Macedonian civilian killed by police.
- 15 February 1995: Opening of an illegal Albanian university in Mala Rečica, 1 Albanian civilian was killed in clashes with the police.
- 9 July 1997; Unrest in Gostivar and Tetovo over use of Albanian flags.
- 23 March 1998; Macedonian Albanians issue a call to arms during the Kosovo War.
- 11 January 2000; Ambush near Aračinovo, where three Macedonian policemen were killed, with ANA claiming responsibility.

== Insurgency ==
- 22 January 2001; Tearce attack (beginning of 2001 insurgency), NLA victory.
- 26 January 2001; Bomb attack on Skopje-Kičevo train, with NLA claiming responsibility.
- 26 February 2001 – 1 March 2001; Battle of Tanuševci, NLA victory.
- 4 March 2001; Ambush near Tanuševci, NLA victory.
- 8 March 2001; Tanuševci operation, NATO-ARM victory.
- 10 March 2001; Brest attack, NLA victory.
- 13 March 2001; Democratic Party of Albanians organized a peace rally in Skopje.
- 14 March 2001, heavy fighting in and around Tetovo. Mass meeting organized on the same day in the city by Albanian non-governmental organizations Organization of Albanian Women, the Civil Rights Forum and the Association of Political Prisoners under the slogan "Stop Macedonian government terror against Albanians."
- 16 March–13 August 2001; Battle of Tetovo, ceasefire.
- 20 March 2001; Macedonian government gave NLA a twenty-hour ultimatum to leave Macedonia.
- 22 March 2001; Macedonian troops kill father and son during a police search in Tetovo.
- 25–27 March 2001; Operation MH, ARM victory.
- 28–29 March 2001; Operation MH-1, ARM victory.
- 14 April 2001; An anti-tank mine killed one and wounded three British soldiers in their armored personnel carrier in the village of Krivenik near Kosovo's border with Macedonia.
- 28 April 2001; Vejce ambush, NLA victory.
- 3 May–6 June 2001; Battle of Vaksince, NLA victory.
- 3 May–11 June 2001; Battle of Slupčane, NLA victory.
- 3 May–11 June 2001; Battle of Orizare, NLA victory.
- 8 May 2001; Operation MH-2, Operation halted.
- 1 June 2001; Lisec clashes
- 26 May 2001; Macedonian forces seize the deserted Lojane and Vaksince.
- 24 May–6 June 2001; Battle of Matejče, NLA victory.
- 5 June 2001; Ambush near Gajre, NLA victory.
- 6 June 2001; Anti-Muslim riots in Bitola with ethnic Macedonian crowds setting homes and shops on fire, desecrated Muslim graves and defaced a mosque with swastikas and made anti-Albanian graffiti containing "Death to the Šiptars."
- 12–25 June 2001; Aračinovo crisis, ceasefire.
- 20 June–13 August 2001; Battle of Raduša, ceasefire.
- 27 June–5 July 2001; Battle of Nikuštak, NLA Victory.
- 7 August 2001; 2001 Skopje police raid, MVR victory.
- 8 August 2001; Karpalak ambush, NLA and ANA victory.
- 8–9 August; Anti-Albanian protests after ambush near Karpalak
- 10 and 12 August 2001; Ljuboten incident, 8 Macedonian soldiers killed by NLA and 10 Albanian civilians killed by the Macedonian police led by Johan Tarčulovski.
- 13 August 2001; Ohrid Agreement.

== Aftermath ==
- 22 August 2001; Operation Essential Harvest, NATO success, NLA disarmed by NATO forces
- 1 September 2001; Hundreds of ethnic Macedonians, mainly internally displaced people, protested in front of the government building in Skopje against NATO's alleged pro-Albanian involvement and to keep members of parliament from initiating parliamentary procedures for the implementation of the Ohrid agreement.
- 22 September 2001 – 15 December 2002; Operation Amber Fox
- 11 November 2001; Ambush near Treboš
- 17 November 2001; Constitutional amendments of the Ohrid agreement adopted by parliament.
