= Battle of Orizare =

Battle during the 2001 insurgency in Macedonia

- Part of the 2001 insurgency in Macedonia
Date	3 May – 11 June 2001
Location	Orizare, Macedonia
Result	NLA victory

Belligerents
National Liberation Army	Macedonia

Commanders and leaders
Xhezair Shaqiri; Jakup Asipi; Beqir Sadiku	Boris Trajkovski (North Macedonia) Ljubčo Georgievski; Ljube Boškoski; Blagoja Markovski; Siniša Stoilov †

Units involved
113th Brigade "Ismet Jashari"	Macedonian Army; Macedonian Police; Macedonian Air force

Strength
17 insurgents	Unknown; T-55 Tanks; Mi-24 gunships

Casualties and losses
Unknown	Unknown
- Orizare Mosque destroyed by Macedonian shelling

The Battle of Orizare (Macedonian: Битката кај Оризаре, Albanian: Beteja e Orizares) was a military engagement between the Macedonian security forces and Albanian insurgents belonging to the National Liberation Army (NLA).

== Battle ==
On May 3, 2001, the NLA launched a three-pronged attack on the villages of Vaksince, Slupčane, and Orizare in the Kumanovo region, which instigated an Immediate response by the Macedonian Army. Macedonian Mil Mi-24 gunships and T-55 tanks were seen shooting at militant positions, trying to drive them out.

On May 8, Macedonian forces initiated a significant offensive in the Kumanovo-Lipkovo region under the codename Operation MH-2, commencing at 8:00 a.m. The operation began with Macedonian security forces engaging in demining activities in the fields, followed by an assault on the villages of Slupčane, Ljubodrag, Lopate, and Orizare. The offensive was executed by a mechanized battalion with artillery support. However, around 2 p.m., the operation was abruptly halted by orders from Boris Trajkovski, conveyed over a phone call to General Pande Petrovski. Later that evening the two ministries reaffirmed their call for residents in villages including Lojane, Matejce, Slupcane, Otlja, Orizare, and Vaskince to promptly evacuate their homes. The evacuation process was scheduled to commence the next day, after which Macedonian security forces would resume their military actions.

On May 13, Mi-8 and Mi-24 attack helicopters approached over the hills of Macedonia and fired rockets at NLA positions. Macedonian army tanks then bombarded Orizare, during the bombardment the village mosque was destroyed. Macedonian soldiers later justified themselves by saying the Mosque was a "terrorist weapons depot".

On May 18, tensions flared as the Macedonian Army broke an unofficial ceasefire, directing artillery fire toward rebel positions near the Kosovo border. The bombardment ceased after six volleys, suggesting a possible government commitment to exercise restraint against ethnic Albanian rebels. The artillery shells were directed at the villages of Slupčane, Orizare, and Vaksince in the Kumanovo region.

On May 21, intense fighting unfolded between Macedonian security forces and NLA rebels. Macedonian tanks, artillery, and combat helicopters were actively engaged in operations against the NLA in a cluster of villages in northeastern Macedonia. The focal points of the Macedonian Army's efforts were concentrated on Vaksince and Slupčane.

On May 28, Macedonian tanks and long-range artillery bombarded Orizare and Slupčane. Blagoja Markovski, the Macedonian Defence Ministry spokesman, added that "fierce fighting" and "terrorist attacks" continued in Slupčane, Orizare, and Otlja. Markovski stated the next day that the military was determined to drive the NLA out of several villages near the border with Kosovo.

On May 30, Macedonian combat helicopters engaged NLA positions, firing upon the villages of Slupčane, Orizare, and Matejče. Simultaneously, Macedonian artillery unleashed a barrage upon these villages. Despite these efforts, the army found itself making no progress.

On June 3, the villages of Matejče, Otlja, Slupčane, and Orizare endured relentless bombardment throughout the day by long-range artillery.

On the nights of June 5–6, heavy fighting occurred, primarily around the villages of Matejce, Otja, Slupcane, and Orizare.

On June 10, Macedonian security forces intensified their operations, targeting the villages of Slupčane and Orizare during a three-day barrage. The onslaught involved the deployment of helicopter gunships, artillery, tanks, and heavy machine guns.

On June 11, Macedonian state radio reported that the army had been ordered to suspend its military operations in the Kumanovo-Lipkovo region, effective at noon that day. The Macedonian army suspended its shelling of ethnic Albanian rebel positions following a morning of intense fighting. The radio further stated that the clashes around the villages of Slupčane, Orizare, and Matejče had subsided.
