= Nazmi Sulejmani =

Albanian commander of the National Liberation Army (born 1965)

- Born: 16 February 1965; Aračinovo, SR Macedonia, SFR Yugoslavia
- Died: 2 February 2018 (aged 52); Aračinovo, Macedonia
- Military career
- Allegiance: National Liberation Army
- Service years: 2000–2001
- Rank: Commander
- Nickname: Komandant Arusha
- Units: 114th Brigade "Fadil Nimani"; 113th Brigade "Ismet Jashari"
- Commands: 5th Battalion of the 113th Brigade
- Conflicts: 2001 insurgency in Macedonia; Brest attack; Operation MH-1; Operation MH-2; Battle of Vaksince; Battle of Slupčane; Battle of Matejče; Aračinovo crisis; Ljuboten incident; Battle of Nikuštak

Nazmi Sulejmani (Albanian: Nazmi Sulejmani; Macedonian: Назми Сулејмани), (16 February 1965 – 2 February 2018), better known as Komandant Arusha, was an Albanian commander of the National Liberation Army (NLA) during the insurgency in Macedonia in 2001. He was born in Aračinovo.

== Life ==
During the War in Macedonia, he joined the National Liberation Army (NLA) and became a commander. He led the 5th Battalion of the 113th Brigade and played a significant role as one of the prominent commanders throughout the conflict. Xhezair Shaqiri, one of the leaders of the NLA, noted his involvement in battles including Brest, Matejče, and Aračinovo. During the conflict, the Macedonian police, consisting of 200 personnel, invaded Sulejmani's farm with the intention of arresting him. However, upon their arrival, Sulejmani was not present at the farm. In a subsequent attempt to assassinate him, the police planted bombs on his truck. When Bernard Kouchner, the representative of the UN mission in Kosovo, arrested Xhavit Hasani, Sulejmani launched an operation against Macedonian troops. As a result of this operation, four Macedonian soldiers were taken captive by Sulejmani. Subsequently, a prisoner exchange took place, with the four kidnapped soldiers being swapped for Xhavit Hasani. He also participated in the Battle of Slupcane, where he served as a commander alongside Beqir Sadiku. On 2 February 2018, he died in his hometown of Aračinovo due to a cardiac arrest.

== Legacy ==
Sulejmani is celebrated as a National Hero by Albanians in North Macedonia.
