= Battle of Raduša =

2001 battle in the Republic of Macedonia

- Part of the 2001 insurgency in Macedonia
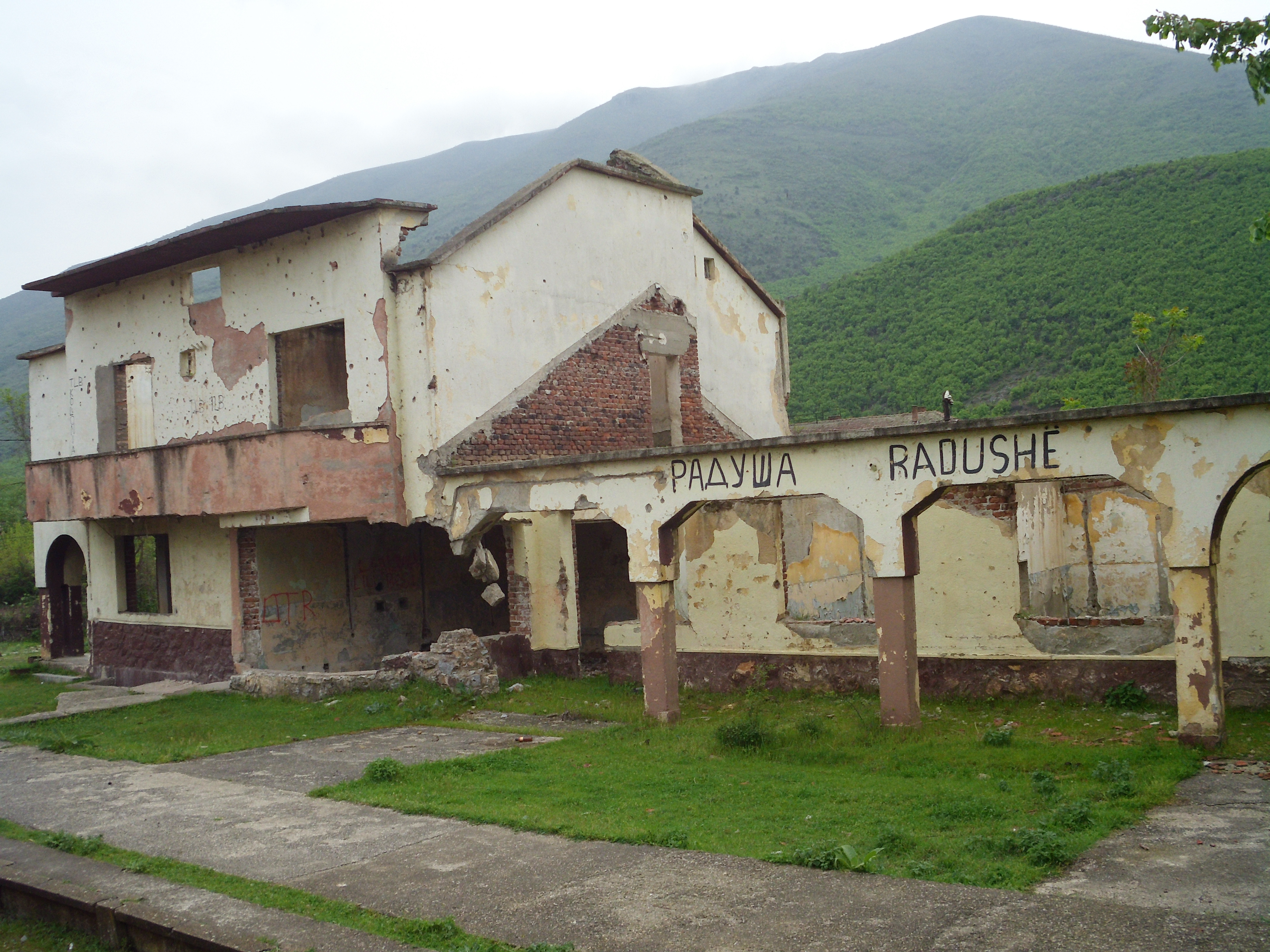
- Ruins of a train station destroyed after the battle in Raduša
Date	20 June – 13 August 2001
Location	Raduša, Saraj, Macedonia
Result	See aftermath

Belligerents
Macedonia	National Liberation Army

Commanders and leaders
Boris Trajkovski; Aco Stojanovski	Rafiz Aliti

Units involved
Macedonian Army; Armored-Mechanized units; Macedonian Air Force; Ministry of Interior; Macedonian Police; "Tigar" Special Police Unit	115th Brigade

Strength
70 policemen and border patrol officers (August); 1 T-55 tank (Start of battle); Mi-24 gunship 1 Su-25	200 militants (August)

Casualties and losses
Unknown; 1 T-55 tank lost 2 APCs lost	Unknown
- 5 Macedonian workers kidnapped and tortured by NLA

The battle of Raduša was part of the wider inter-ethnic conflict known as the insurgency in the Republic of Macedonia between the Albanian NLA and Macedonian security forces concentrated near the border with Kosovo. The brunt of the fighting happened near the village of Raduša and Bojane villages that guard the roads to the Rašče water supply which supplies water to the capital city of Skopje.

== Battle ==
=== Opening skirmishes ===
The first clash took place on 20 June 2001, when four policemen from the Raduša police station discovered an NLA camp of forty insurgents on the steps of Žeden mountain, during a patrol of the terrain on the border, after which they had opened fire on the militants. The patrol called on air support which came immediately and pushed the insurgents towards Kosovo.

On 23 June, one of the most dramatic single events in the conflict occurred when another police border patrol was attacked in an NLA ambush near Raduša. The police patrol was led by Aco Stojanovski, the Deputy-Commander of the Raduša police station. The insurgents fired at the police vehicle with RPG rockets, throwing three policemen out of the car and leaving one inside. The NLA attempted to approach the badly wounded policemen. Commander Stojanovski's firing six rounds from an AK-47 at the insurgents saved them until soldiers from the Raduša border post arrived and repelled the NLA with fire from an armored personnel carrier. After the conflict, commander Stojanovski became the president of the Union of Army and Police veterans of the Conflict in Macedonia. After this ambush there were calls to seriously strengthen the defenses around Raduša in order to prevent the NLA from capturing the water supply near the village of Rasce which would have stopped the water supply to the capital city of Skopje. Following the clashes on 23 June, 1,400 civilians from the area fled to Kosovo.

In July, the NLA descended from the mountains into the predominantly Albanian city of Tetovo and pushed into the Polog Valley. Several Albanian villages joined their cause, and NLA fighters advanced to the Zeden ridge between Tetovo and Skopje, eventually also attacking the border town of Raduša. These offensives left government forces cut off in Tetovo, along with several small garrisons around the town and in Vratnica, which could only be resupplied by helicopter. Throughout late June and early July, the NLA made repeated attempts to capture the village. On 2 July, two Macedonian Mi-24 helicopter gunships were sent toward Raduša, in order to attack the NLA which by that time had already seized most of the village, The NLA reportedly also seriously wounded two Macedonian soldiers in the village during the fighting. On 3 July, the NLA continued its assaults by targeting Macedonian police checkpoints near the village with mortar fire. One day later, on 4 July, the NLA reportedly killed a Macedonian soldier in the area following an assault on Macedonian positions using mortars, sniper fire, and automatic weapons. Army spokesman Colonel Blagoja Markovski described Raduša as an NLA stronghold, while Macedonian attack helicopters continued to strike NLA positions. On 5 July, the NLA further advanced into the village and launched an assault on the local police station. However, the fighting quelled down after a ceasefire on 5 July.

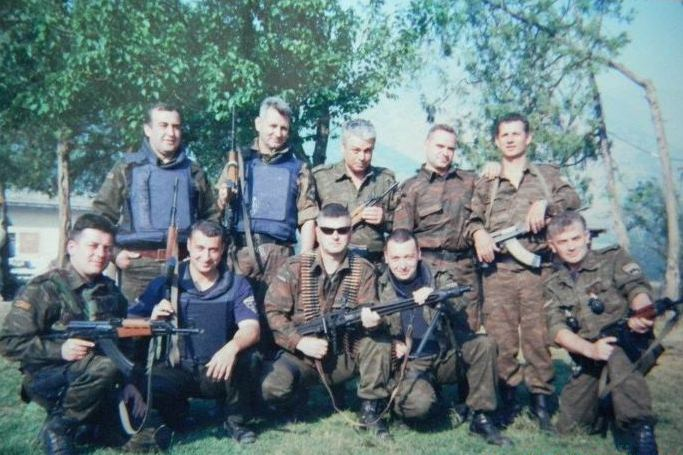
Reservist units of the Macedonian police in Raduša (on the border with Kosovo), a month before the battle for Raduša.

=== Major offensive ===
In the early hours of 10 August 2001, the NLA, then numbering around 10 men, launched an offensive from the area of Krivenik in the Kosovo Municipality of Hani i Elezit, invading the territory of Macedonia in the region of Raduša. The offensive took place during the ceasefire period, only days before the signing of the Ohrid Framework Agreement. The first actions began at 20:00 the same day with a mortar attack on the Raduša police station, located at the entrance of the village. The police station was manned by only thirty-five policemen. The security forces returned fire and the shootout lasted until 2:00 A.M. During the offensive, Macedonian forces deployed Sukhoi Su-25 jets, which intercepted NLA rebels, leading to their repulsion. During the attack one police officer was injured. According to Macedonian intelligence service, the attack was conducted by more than six hundred NLA insurgents, supported by volunteers from the Kosovo Protection Corps. It claimed that the Corps came from the town of Krivenik in Kosovo and crossed the Macedonian border into Raduša during the night. According to them, the NLA and KPC plan of action was to neutralise the security forces in the Raduša sector, then penetrate southwards and capture the Rašče water spring which feeds the Macedonian capital Skopje with drinking water. Cutting water supplies would create a humanitarian crisis in the city.

The Ministry of Interior single-handedly declared an alert condition and sent detachments of the "Tiger" special police unit to dig in and secure the Rašče spring. Other detachments of the "Tiger" were sent to rescue thirty-five policemen surrounded at the Raduša station. Because of the lack of artillery support, and the overwhelming numbers of the NLA encirclement, they dug–in at positions outside Raduša. The Minister of Interior Ljube Boškoski and Prime Minister Ljubčo Georgievski asked President Trajkovski for an immediate activation of the army in order to neutralise the alleged invasion from Kosovo. The president, however, encouraged by the NATO and EU envoys, was concentrated on reaching a political solution that respected the conditions of the 5 July Ceasefire Agreement. He asked that the police not respond to provocations in order to avoid an escalation of the conflict. Meanwhile, the encircled policemen in the Raduša station were left on their own.

On 11 August, the NLA launched another large-scale attack on Raduša, achieving significant successes against Macedonian forces. A column of two hundred Albanian insurgents attacked the Raduša army border post with mortar, automatic rifle and sniper fire. The Raduša army border post, located between the villages of Kučkovo and Raduša, was manned by twenty-five soldiers with mortars, automatic rifles, one tank, and three armoured personnel carriers. During the attack, two Macedonian soldiers were wounded by the NLA assault. At the same time, the NLA conducted another assault attack on the encircled police station at the Raduša village. The army and police returned fire and, during the heavy fighting, the NLA managed to set fire to the petrol barrels within the barracks of the army border post. The insurgents managed to come so close that they started cutting the wire-fence. During the NLA assault, Macedonian forces once again heavily relied on their Sukhoi Su-25 jets and long-range rocket attacks. However, these efforts proved unsuccessful, as the Macedonian forces were forced to withdraw. On 13 August, the encircled Macedonian policemen had to be rescued by Mi-24 gunships, which were ultimately successful in relieving the officers. Five policemen had been wounded during the fighting.

=== Macedonian counter-offensive ===
On 13 August, Macedonian forces launched a major offensive against the NLA in Raduša, utilizing all available military resources to expel the rebels from the village. The operation involved 700 infantrymen, supported by T-55 tanks, armored personnel carriers (APCs), and air support, including Sukhoi Su-25 fighter jets and Mi-24 attack helicopters. However, the offensive ended in failure, with Macedonian forces being forced to abandon one T-55 tank, as well as two armored personnel carriers, a TM 170 and a BTR, which were captured by the NLA and subsequently used against Macedonian forces. The Macedonian Defense Ministry claimed that they had sent Mi-24 attack helicopters to destroy the captured T-55 tank, but this was proven to be false. The tank was fully functional when the NLA handed it over to NATO forces during Operation Essential Harvest. Following the withdrawal, the NLA fully captured the village and advanced to within 10 km of the capital, Skopje. After the NLA took control of the village, Rafiz Aliti, also known as Commander Mesuesi, stated that he aimed to establish new terms with the Macedonians and insisted that he and his fighters would not surrender their weapons to NATO forces. This occurred just before the Ohrid Agreement was signed.

== Aftermath ==
After the signing of the ceasefire Raduša was chosen as one of the designated collection sites for the voluntary disposal of NLA weapons where the 115th Brigade which took part in the battle disposed of its weapons and captured vehicles after the Macedonian security forces previously withdrew from the collection sites as was agreed with NATO, the NLA did not honor its commitment to withdraw to lines held before the 5 July ceasefire.

According to Rafiz Aliti, the main commander of the NLA during the battle, the NLA suffered no fatalities throughout the entire battle. Aliti reported that his forces only had seven soldiers injured, with one soldier losing a hand. The Macedonian Defense Ministry claimed that they had killed more than 650 NLA rebels while suffering no casualties. This claim was propaganda.

== See also ==
- Operation Vaksince
- Operation MH-2
- Operation MH
