= Operation MH-1 =

Macedonian military operation

- Part of the 2001 insurgency in Macedonia
Date	28–29 March 2001
Location	Macedonia (Skopska Crna Gora and Kumanovo region near border with Kosovo)
Result	Macedonian government victory (Note: Sources:)
Territorial changes	Macedonian government security forces regain control of Gračani

Belligerents
Macedonia	National Liberation Army

Commanders and leaders
Boris Trajkovski; Pande Petrovski; Ljube Boškoski; Risto Galevski; Robert Petkovski	Xhezair Shaqiri; Nazmi Sulejmani; Commander Sokoli; Beqir Sadiku; Hysni Shaqiri

Units involved
Macedonian Army; "Wolves" Battalion; Ministry of Internal Affairs; Macedonian Police; Special Support Unit	115th Brigade; 113th Brigade

Strength
300 soldiers 10 T-55 Tanks; Multiple APC's; 2 Mi-24 gunships Unknown	100 militants

Casualties and losses
1 soldier killed 2 soldiers wounded	Unknown
- 2 civilians in Kosovo killed and 10 wounded

Operation MH-1 was a Macedonian military operation with the goal to clear out the NLA rebels from the Skopska Crna Gora region all along the Macedonian border. The offensive started on March 28, 2001, and ended the next day.

== Prelude ==
Two days before the start of Operation MH-1 the Macedonian security forces started Operation MH in the Tetovo region which cleared out the NLA from the city and the surrounding villages.

== Battle ==
The Macedonian security forces started a two pronged attack near the Kosovo border using tanks, APC's and helicopter gunships and occupied most roads and villages along the Kosovo border installing police checkpoints.

During the operation, Macedonian infantry units were reluctant to engage in an open battle with the rebels.

Although the Macedonian Army officially claimed victory, the NLA stated that they were only regrouping around Gračani for an upcoming counter-offensive.

== Aftermath ==
On 31 March, 30 suspected rebels in Kosovo tried to cross the border into Macedonia, however they were detained by NATO forces.

After the end of operation MH-1 and the securing of the border with Kosovo, the Macedonian armed forces launched Operation MH-2 to clear out the rebels in Kumanovo.

== See also ==
- Operation MH
- Operation MH-2
- Operation Vaksince
