= Battle of Matejče =

2001 battle in North Macedonia

- Part of the 2001 insurgency in Macedonia
Date	24 May – 5 June 2001
Location	Matejče, Macedonia
Result	NLA victory
Territorial changes	NLA captures Matejče and declares complete control over it on 6 June 2001

Belligerents
National Liberation Army	Macedonia

Commanders and leaders
Hajrulla Misini; Beqir Sadiku; Nazmi Sulejmani; Lefter Koxhaj; Xhemail Rexhepi	Vlado Bučkovski; Pande Petrovski; Blagoja Markovski; Ljube Boškoski; Stojanče Angelov

Units involved
National Liberation Army; 113th Brigade "Ismet Jashari"; 114th Brigade “Fadil Nimani”; “Skënderbeu” Special Unit; “Shqiponjat” Special Unit	Macedonian Army; Macedonian Police "Tigar" Special Police Unit

Strength
144 militants	50 officers (start of the battle); Unknown; 3 T-55 tanks 20 armoured vehicles Mi-24 helicopters

Casualties and losses
14 militants killed	1 soldier killed 3 soldiers wounded 1 tank destroyed
- 8 Macedonian Serbs abused by NLA; Around 20 people kidnapped by NLA; Matejče Monastery destroyed by NLA; Matejče Mosque destroyed by government shelling

The Battle of Matejče (Macedonian: Битката кај Матејче Albanian: Beteja e Mateçit) was a military confrontation between the National Liberation Army (NLA) and the Macedonian Army in the village of Matejče during the 2001 insurgency in Macedonia. The NLA succeeded in capturing the village on 5 June 2001 and the Macedonian Army was forced to withdraw from Matejče. The Macedonian Army continued to shell Matejče until 11 June 2001.

== Battle ==
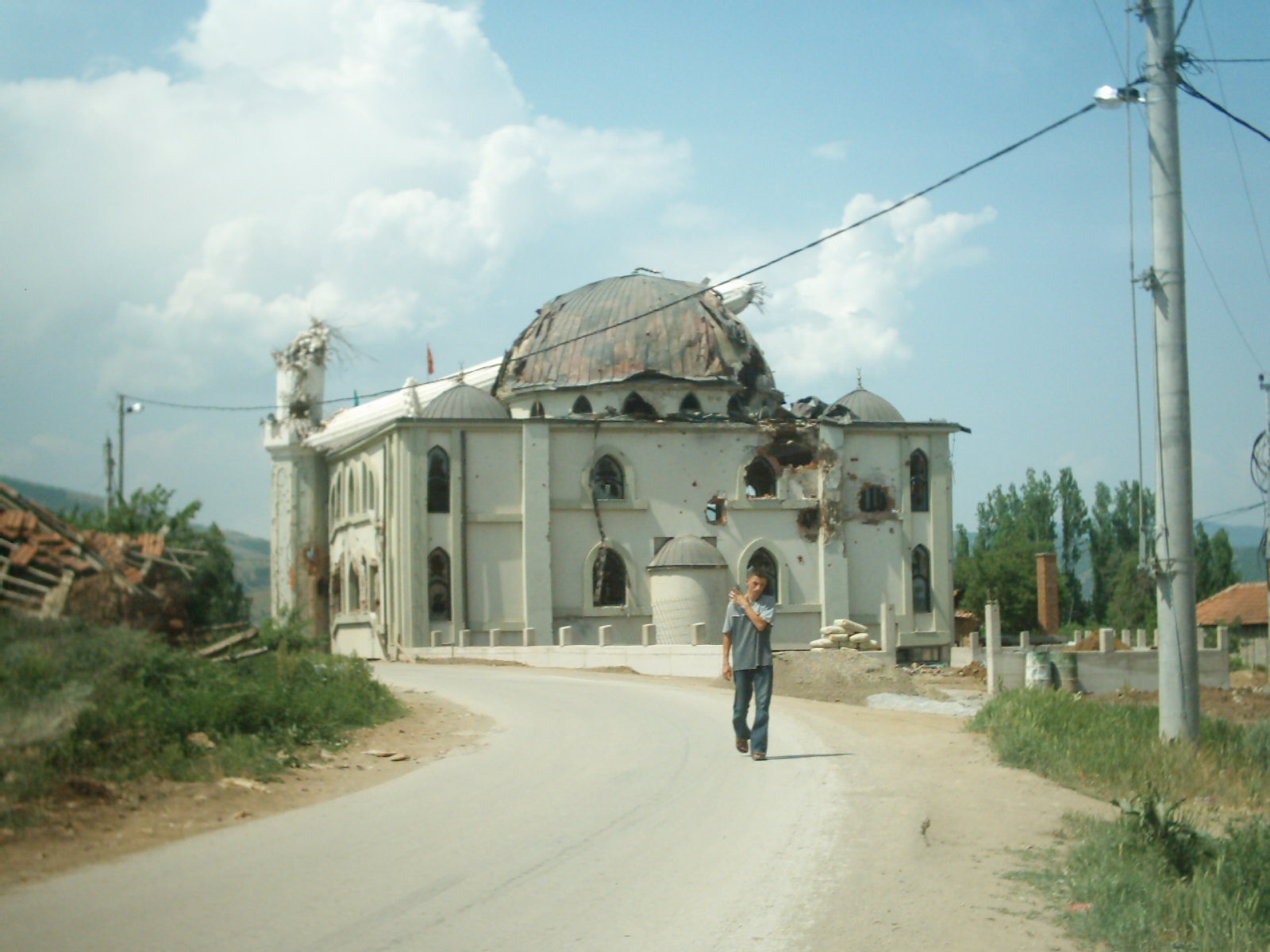
Matejče Mosque destroyed during the battle

=== Initial NLA attack ===
On 24 May 2001, in the aftermath of heavy fighting between the insurgents and Macedonian forces in the nearby villages of Vaksince and Slupčane, dozens of NLA insurgents entered Matejče and attacked the local police station.

=== Macedonian response ===
On 26 May, Macedonian forces launched a large-scale assault on the NLA positions. The Macedonians succeeded in retaking much of Matejče and pushing the NLA to the very outskirts of the village. During the assault, one Macedonian soldier was wounded by NLA mortar fire.

=== NLA counter-attack and main combat phase ===
On May 27, after the successful Macedonian advance, the NLA began a counter-attack, engaging the Macedonian forces with heavy mortar and sniper fire, eventually capturing a part of the village and surrounding the local police station.

On the same day, a Macedonian Army convoy of around 20 APCs, three T-55 tanks and a bus with policemen were sent to the village. Later that day the Macedonian Army also used Mil Mi-24 helicopter gunships, artillery and tanks to target suspected guerrilla positions in Matejče.

Fighting resumed the next day, with the NLA firing five 120-millimeter mortar shells.

During the fighting on 30 May, a Macedonian truck ran over an NLA-planted mine, wounding three members of the tigers special police unit. One of the officers was seriously wounded due to the assault and in October died in hospital in Skopje due to injuries.

From 1 to 3 June, Macedonian forces again shelled Matejče and again tried to regain control of the area. However, on June 5 the NLA captured the village and Macedonian forces were forced to withdraw. On 6 June the NLA confirmed to have regained complete control over Matejče and Vaksince.

== Personnel killed in the battle ==
=== NLA personnel ===
- Sali Latifi, insurgent.
- Hasip Emerllahu, insurgent.
- Iljas Mehmeti, insurgent.
- Mevludin Mehmeti, insurgent.
- Faik Ibrahimi, insurgent.
- Ali Mahmuti, insurgent.
- Ismet Latifi, insurgent.
- Labinot Krasniqi, insurgent.
- Visar Krasniqi, insurgent.
- Elmi Hoti, insurgent.

=== Macedonian personnel ===
- Aleksandar Serafimov, member of the Tigar special police unit.

== Aftermath ==
During the battle eleven NLA militants were killed, most of them while trying to regain lost ground during the NLA counter-attack. One Macedonian T-55 tank was destroyed. According to Macedonian general Pande Petrovski, the tank was destroyed by friendly fire. Per AP News, it was believed that eight Macedonian soldiers were killed in the destroyed tank. The village mosque was completely destroyed during the fighting. On 11 June the Matejče Monastery as well as homes of ethnic Macedonian civilians were destroyed and burned by the Albanian militants.

According to Human Rights Watch, the NLA physically abused eight Serb civilians in the village. Macedonian propaganda later claimed the NLA were holding civilians as human shields, this claim was proven false when local civilians admitted they were staying in the combat zone out of fear of falling into the hands of the Macedonian police.
