= Jakup Asipi =

Macedonian military commander and religious scholar

- Born: 12 February 1951; Slupčane, Kumanovo, FPR Yugoslavia, (present-day North Macedonia)
- Died: 7 January 2006 (aged 54); Kumanovo, Macedonia
- Military career
- Allegiance: National Liberation Army
- Rank: Commander
- Unit: 113th Brigade
- Conflicts: 2001 insurgency in Macedonia; Battle of Slupčane; Battle of Orizare; Operation MH-2

Jakup Asipi
- Title: Mufti; Mullah; Hoxhë

Personal life
- Main interest(s): Hadith, Aqidah, Fiqh, Shariah
- Education: Al-Azhar University
- Occupation: Imam, Mufti, Orator

Religious life
- Religion: Islam
- Denomination: Sunni
- Jurisprudence: Hanafi
- Creed: Maturidi

Muslim leader
- Post: Mufti of Kumanovo and Lipkovo
- Period in office: 2003–2006
- Influenced by: Hafiz Ejup ef. Jashari

Mulla Jakup Asipi (2 February 1951 – 7 January 2006) was a Macedonian Albanian mullah and commander of the National Liberation Army. He was one of the most important religious personalities among the Albanian Muslims. His multimedia appearance in the last 25 years, especially after the 1990s, has directly influenced the awareness of the Karadak region, both in terms of the Islamic religious and the national and patriotic aspects.

== Life ==
Jakup Asipi was born in the village of Slupčane on 2 February 1951. Asipi completed his primary education in his hometown and his secondary education in Damascus, Syria at the "al-Furkan" madrasa in 1980. He completed his studies at Al-Az'har University, in the Faculty of Islamic Religion in Egypt in 1985, while he continued his postgraduate studies in Beirut, Lebanon. During his studies, Asipi became a Hafiz.

During the years 1985–1990, he worked as an imam in a mosque in Leverkusen, Germany. Aware of the situation in his home country in the 1990s, he returned to contribute to the relieving of the plight of the population. His lectures led to numerous threats and interrogations by the Macedonian police. From this period until his death, he organized over 5,000 lectures.

During the insurgency in Macedonia, Asipi commanded units within the 113th brigade in the "Free Zone of Karadak," which consisted of villages such as Lipkovo, Matejče, and Slupčane, among others, where some of the heaviest fighting during the entire insurgency took place. The terrified Macedonian and Serbian residents of these villages, mostly elderly people, were forced to flee south to the city of Kumanovo. Some stated afterwards that long-bearded, Albanian fighters had tortured them. During the conflict, Goran Stojkov, the commander of the police unit Lions, claimed that there were mujahedin training camps in the Lipkovo wilderness. Besides commanding forces, Asipi was also tasked with raising funds from Muslims across Europe. Asipi was beloved by the local Albanians as a fatherly moral authority and feared by Macedonians who considered him a radical Islamist. Macedonian media later referred to Jakup Asipi as the "Mad Mullah of Slupčane" due to his alleged promotion of anti-Macedonian sentiment in his home village. During the insurgency, he became the imam of both Slupčane and Matejče. According to Macedonian refugees, the Matejče mosque, where Asipi served as imam, was used as a site where NLA militants allegedly detained and assaulted Macedonian civilians. Additionally, reports claimed that several Macedonian women were raped by NLA militants during the fighting in Matejče. Macedonian media soon linked Asipi with the mujahedin but his friends and family rejected any connection with Islamic fundamentalism.

After the end of the war in 2001, Asipi was elected as the mufti for the municipalities of Kumanovo and Lipkovo. Asipi was also a candidate for national leadership. He died in a car accident on 7 January 2006. His funeral, which took place at the NLA war memorial center above Slupčane, drew approximately 15,000 Albanians from across Europe, including leaders from the NLA/KLA and various Islamic clerics.

== Works ==
- 1000 Thënie (meaning the '1000 sayings').
- Për diturinë
- Sinqeriteti
