= Operation MH-2 =

Military operation during the 2001 insurgency in Macedonia

- Part of the 2001 insurgency in Macedonia
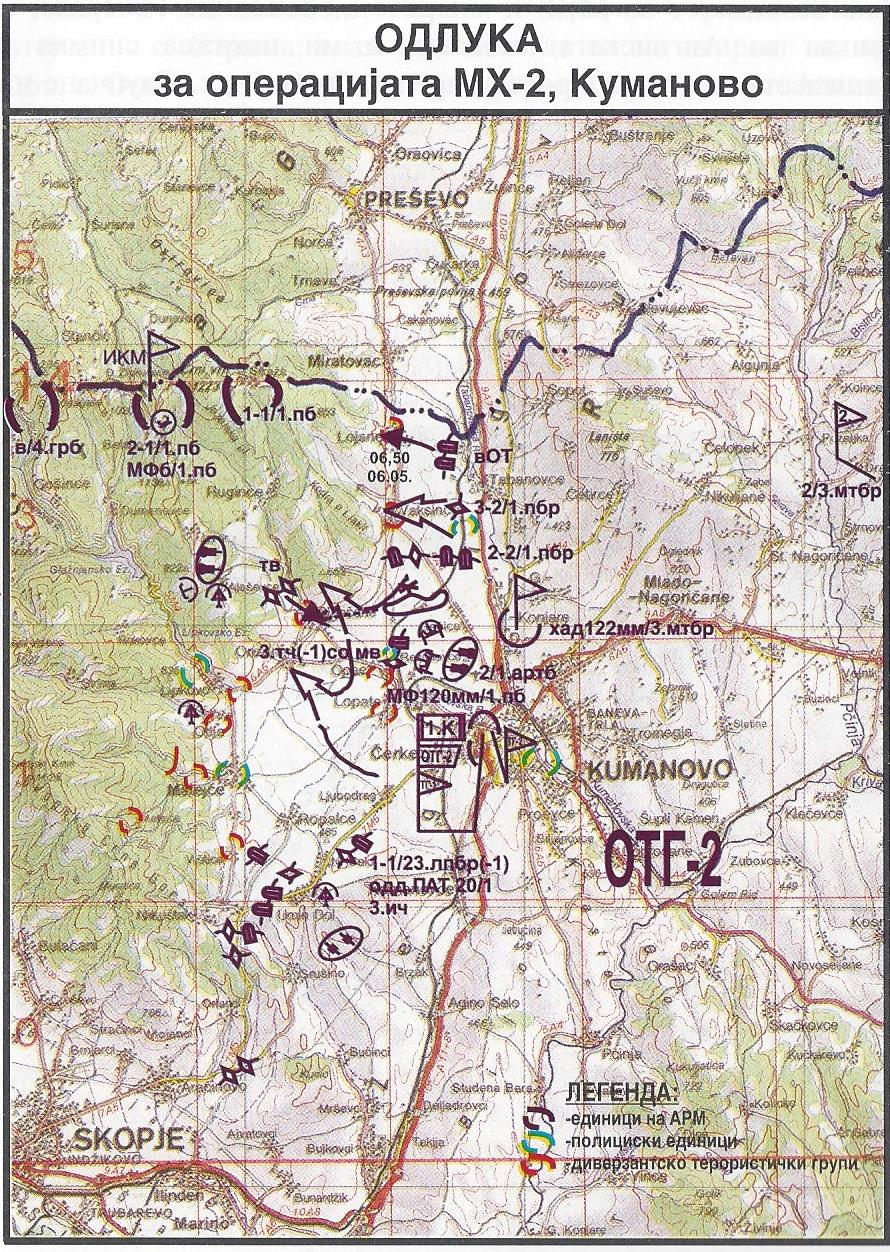
Date	8 May 2001
Location	Kumanovo, Lipkovo, Macedonia
Result	Operation halted due to civilian presence in the conflict area: Macedonian forces continue their counter-insurgency campaign; Operation Vaksince, and Operation Aračinovo launched

Belligerents
Macedonia	National Liberation Army

Commanders and leaders
Boris Trajkovski; Pande Petrovski; Ljube Boškoski; Risto Galevski	Fadil Nimani; Xhezair Shaqiri; Jakup Asipi; Nazmi Sulejmani; Jetullah Qarri

Units involved
Macedonian Army; Macedonian Police	114th Brigade; 113th Brigade

Strength
Unknown number of soldiers 3 tanks 460 police officers	Unknown

Casualties and losses
2 soldiers killed 1 captured (later released)	

Operation MH-2 (Macedonian: Операција МХ-2) was a military operation in the Kumanovo-Lipkovo region during the insurgency in the Republic of Macedonia.

== Execution of the Operation MH-2 ==
Macedonian forces started to demine the fields at 8 a.m. and attacked with one mechanized battalion with support of artillery villages: Slupčane, Ljubodrag, Lopate and Orizare.

At around 2 p.m., the operation was stopped by orders of Boris Trajkovski over the phone call to general Pande Petrovski.

The Macedonian army claimed that 30 militants were killed.

== See also ==
- Operation Vaksince
- Testimonies 2001
