= Operation MH =

Macedonian military operation

- Part of the 2001 insurgency in Macedonia and Battle of Tetovo
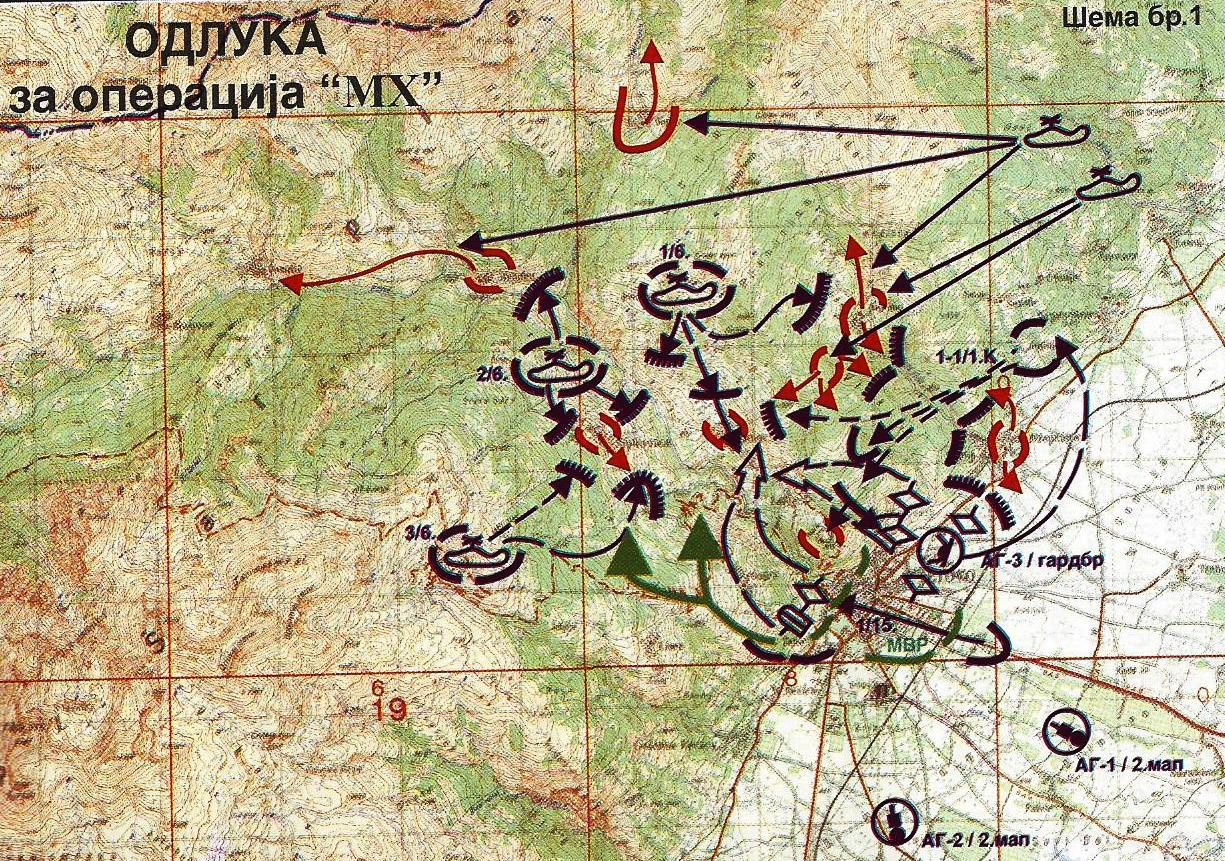
Date	25–27 March 2001
Location	Tetovo, Brodec, Gajre, Šipkovica, Lisec, Džepčište, Popova Šapka, Ǵermo, Macedonia
Result	Macedonian government victory
Territorial changes	Macedonian government regains control over all of Tetovo region-held NLA territory at that time (Note: Sources:); Macedonian security forces seize weapons, ammunition and uniforms

Belligerents
Macedonia	National Liberation Army

Commanders and leaders
Boris Trajkovski; Pande Petrovski; Ljube Boškoski	Gëzim Ostreni; Samidin Xhezairi; Rahim Beqiri; Hamdi Nëdrecaj

Units involved
Macedonian Army; Macedonian Special Forces; “Wolves” Battalion; Armored–Mechanized Units; Artillery Units; Macedonian Air Force; Ministry of Interior; Macedonian Police; Special Police Unit "Tigers"	National Liberation Army; 112th Brigade "Mujdin Aliu"

Strength
200+ soldiers and policemen 2+ T-55 tanks APCs; 2 MI-24 helicopters	300–700 militants

Casualties and losses
2 soldiers wounded 1 APC lightly damaged 1 policeman wounded	Unknown
- 20 Albanian civilians wounded

Operation MH (Macedonian: Операција МХ) was the first major offensive by the combined forces of the Macedonian Army and police forces in the 2001 insurgency in Macedonia. The goal of the operation was to dislodge the NLA forces which were entrenched in Tetovo and the hills and villages in its vicinity.

== Prelude ==
Weeks prior Albanian rebels had taken control of the Tetovo fortress and several villages in the Tetovo municipality where sporadic fighting occurred between Macedonian security forces and Albanian rebels. The government conducted so called "search and sweep operations" that lead to several arrests.

== Execution of the Operation MH ==
The operation started at 7am on 25 March with an hour long artillery barrage followed by Macedonian Army units moving in to encircle the villages held by the rebels. Helicopters covered the retreat and reinforcement routes that lead to Kosovo, during the first phase of the battle stiff resistance was encountered in the village of Gajre and Šipkovica which was overcome with the assistance of police special forces and fresh reserves. The fall of Šipkovica and Gajre opened the path for the capture of the Tetovo fortress which was accomplished by the Macedonian Special Forces. According to Macedonian sources the rebels were fleeing in panic across the mountains leaving weapons and uniforms behind while Albanian sources called it a tactical retreat.

== See also ==
- Operation MH-1
- Operation Vaksince
- Operation MH-2
