= Aračinovo crisis =

Siege during the 2001 insurgency in Macedonia

- Part of the 2001 insurgency in Macedonia
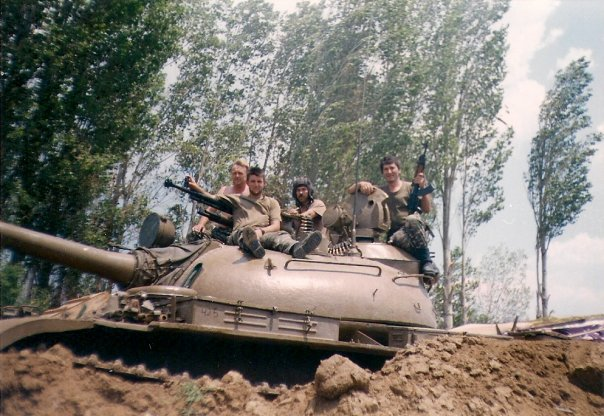
- Macedonian Army reservist T-55 tank crew at the Battle of Aračinovo
Date	12–25 June 2001
Location	Aračinovo, Macedonia
Result	Inconclusive
Territorial changes	Macedonian troops re-establish control over Aračinovo under OSCE supervision after ceasefire; NATO escorts NLA militants out of Aračinovo after ceasefire is signed

Belligerents
National Liberation Army	Macedonia

Commanders and leaders
Xhezair Shaqiri; Emrush Suma; Nazmi Sulejmani; Beqir Sadiku †; Lefter Koxhaj	Boris Trajkovski; Vlado Bučkovski; Pande Petrovski; Ljube Boškoski; Risto Galevski; Stojanče Angelov (WIA)

Units involved
National Liberation Army; 113th Brigade "Ismet Jashari"; Skanderbeg special unit	Macedonian Army; Macedonian Special Forces; “Wolves” Battalion; Armored–Mechanized Units; Macedonian Air Force; Ministry of Interior; Macedonian Police; Special Police Unit "Tigers"; Special Support Unit

Strength
100–170 militants	Unknown; Unknown; MI-24 attack helicopters MI-17 and MI-8 helicopters 2 Su-25 fighter jets 54 T-55 tanks

Casualties and losses
8 militants killed	4 policemen killed

The Aračinovo crisis was a series of events triggered by the occupation of the village of Aračinovo, in the outskirts of the Macedonian capital Skopje, by the insurgent National Liberation Army (NLA) in June 2001 and the consequent attempts by the Macedonian army (ARM) to retake the settlement. The Macedonian attack resulted in a standoff with NATO, whose troops evacuated the besieged rebels after a ceasefire accord. The crisis is considered to be the turning point in the Macedonian war of 2001, and one of its most controversial incidents.

== Background ==
On 12 June 2001, a group of several hundred NLA insurgents took control of the ethnically mixed village of Aračinovo, located just eight kilometers from the edge of the capital Skopje. The commander of the NLA forces in Aračinovo, Xhezair Shaqiri, warned that unless the army ceased its attacks on NLA positions in the north of the country the insurgents would target strategic positions in Skopje, including "the airport, oil refineries, police stations in towns and other government installations". Shaqiri told journalists that his men had 120 mm mortars, and stated that "I will start attacking police stations and the airport, the government and parliament – everything I can with our 120mm mortars". According to Shaqiri, the insurgents' key demand was to be included in talks on the country's constitutional future – something explicitly ruled out by the government. Previously the Macedonian government forces had retaken a string of villages in successful operations like Operation MH-1, Operation Vaksince and were fighting for control of the area near Slupčane, where they maid slow gains, a situation complicated by the presence of thousands of civilians in the villages which forces the security forces to halt their operations on more than one occasion.

The seizure of Aračinovo triggered a further exodus of residents, many of whom fled north to neighbouring Kosovo. The Macedonian Government did not respond officially to the NLA ultimatum, but reports said it had increased security around key facilities.

The Aračinovo crisis put ever stronger diplomatic pressure on the Macedonian government, from NATO and the EU, for a political resolution of the conflict. The attention that the Aračinovo crisis attracted was so great that NATO Secretary-General George Robertson and the European Union security chief Javier Solana visited Macedonia to bolster efforts for a political solution to the conflict. The crisis also widened the divide within the government on the matter of the approach toward resolving the conflict. The Prime Minister and the Minister of Interior were in favour of a continuation of the successful offensives from March and May 2001, whereas the President was pushing for a political solution.

During his meeting with Solana, President Trajkovski promised to resolve the Aračinovo crisis with political dialog. However, after several meetings of the "Coordinative Body for the Resolution of the Crisis", as well as with the "Command for the Defence of the City of Skopje", on 18 June it was decided to execute a military operation to crush the NLA forces in Aračinovo. The plan was prepared by General Pande Petrovski and was to be conducted by both police and infantry with the artillery and air support of the army. The representatives of NATO in Macedonia were not informed of the decision.

== Assault on Aračinovo ==
The operation by the Macedonian security forces began at 4:30 am on 21 June with an artillery barrage by the army. The Macedonian army used some of its heaviest fire-power, with helicopter gunships being employed to attack targets in the village. At nightfall, the 6th detachment of the Ministry of Interior, as well as the Special Police unit "Tiger", began an assault from the direction of the neighbouring suburb of Singelich. This assault was coordinated with an assault by a tank platoon from the direction of Brnjarci, thus cutting off Aračinovo from the north. After initial clashed on the northern side, the security forces slowly approached the village graveyards, and the insurgents reinforced their positions around the new mosque. According to General Pande Petrovski, who commanded the Aračinovo operation, the ARM had at its disposal several armored battalions with almost 20,000 soldiers, 54 tanks, 120–130 mortars, Mi-24 helicopters and a sufficient amount of ammunition to carry out a decisive operation and destroy the NLA as an effective fighting force. The battle lasted three days, and Macedonian reports claimed to have captured two-thirds of the village. Although local villagers claimed that the Macedonian Army didn't progress at all and was unable to get into the village. Western reports also questioned Macedonian claims, asserting that the Macedonian Assault ended in failure. Macedonian media reports asserted that NATO brokered a ceasefire allegedly to rescue the NLA rebels from the Macedonian assault on the town. However, these claims were subsequently challenged by Western reports, which claimed that it was the Macedonian government that sought a ceasefire due to its military failure in expelling the NLA from the town.

The onslaught on the eastern part of the NLA-held positions went even more slowly because of stronger resistance, especially at Bel Kamen (one kilometre from Aračinovo). Only when reinforcements were sent to assist the assault from the southern side did Bel Kamen fall into the hands of the police. The insurgents retreated from Bel Kamen, leaving much of their equipment behind. Height 354 to the west of the village was also captured during the first day, opening the way for the security forces to enter the village. At the end of the first day of the operation, the Macedonian police managed to penetrate the village from the north and the west, but advanced very slowly due to strong resistance from the NLA positions. To the east and to the south the police temporarily dug in at the entrance of the village.

On the second day, Macedonian troops continued subjecting NLA-held Aračinovo to a heavy artillery barrage. Operations during the second day began with a reconnaissance flight by a Sukhoi Su-25. It was followed by an artillery, tank and helicopter assaults on insurgent positions. Army Mi-24 helicopters swooped in on the village, firing repeatedly at the area from which the NLA had threatened to shell Macedonia's capital and its airport. The police, supported by mortar fire, conducted infantry attacks into the village from the eastern side and made minor advances towards the centre. From the western side, the police advanced up to the new mosque, leaving only the wider centre of the village in NLA hands. A Macedonian army spokesman said the infantry had recaptured one third of the village as a part of a major offensive during the second day of the battle. The second day the insurgents put up fierce resistance, and the battle was fought for every house. The NLA resistance culminated during the third day of the Macedonian security forces' onslaught. Three members of the police were killed in action in Brnjarci's graveyard. A member of the special police unit "Tiger" also died of his wounds on 28 June. Though it was never officially disclosed, friendly fire has been suspected as the cause of the deaths of the policemen. The commander of the same unit, Stojance Angelov was seriously wounded during an attempt to penetrate the centre of the village. However, despite the casualties, the security forces continued the operation.

The Macedonian security forces resumed their assault on the ethnic Albanian insurgents for a third day, despite international pressure for a truce. A government spokesman announced that he was confident that the rebels would be defeated within four or five days. During the third day of the battle, the police claimed to control two-thirds of the village, and were attacking the village centre where severe resistance was encountered. In the advance towards the village centre, security forces bombarded every new NLA point with artillery and tanks shells, and only afterwards sent in the police. This tactic was designed to exhaust the insurgents who, according to intelligence sources, had only limited supplies.

However, on the fourth day of the battle President Trajkovski ordered the security forces to halt all operations immediately.

== Halting of operations ==
According to General Pande Petrovski, who was in charge of the operation, on 25 June at 9:00 in the morning, he was called by the President and was told to halt the operation. Petrovski, however, ordered the assault to continue. At 12:45 the president telephoned general Petrovski again and said:

General I want until 13:00 all of your activities in Aračinovo to be halted, and you will go to hotel "Belvi" to meet with NATO envoys. Don't you dare use the aviation, don't play games, I already explained what's the matter!.

Petrovski ordered a halt to military activities by security forces and headed towards hotel "Belvi" where he encountered television crews, foreign diplomats, government representatives, and representatives of the President's cabinet. He was informed that everyone was awaiting the arrival of Javier Solana at 16:00.

During the meeting held the same day with EU's senior foreign policy official, Javier Solana, the Macedonian government agreed to stop completely their military activities in Aračinovo, and to let the NLA insurgents leave the encircled village. After talks between President Boris Trajkovski and Javier Solana, the Macedonian government officially announced that it had ended its offensive against the NLA in Aračinovo. According to western media reports the talks were apparently "extremely acrimonious", with the Macedonian security forces reluctant to abandon a battle they were convinced that they were going to win.

It was agreed that the evacuation of the insurgents would be conducted with logistical support from U.S. military servicemen of the 101st Airborne Division. It was also agreed by the government that during the evacuation, the insurgents would take their weapons, and their dead and wounded with them. The details of the logistics of the evacuation were organised by the USA special envoy for the Balkans, Peter Feith. The evacuation started at 17:00 and was conducted by U.S. Army personnel from the American contingent within KFOR in Kosovo which were based at Camp Able Sentry at the Skopje International Airport. The U.S. servicemen tasked with the evacuation of the NLA insurgents passed Macedonian and entered the village, taking with them all of the NLA members that were in the village. On their way towards the evacuation route, however, they stumbled upon roadblocks placed by groups of ethnic Macedonian civilians that were protesting the evacuation. After the government sent representatives to talk to the civilians, they agreed to lift the roadblocks and allow the convoy to proceed as planned. The convoy transported the insurgents to the village of Nikushtak, on NLA controlled territory.

The following day, the Macedonian troops entered Aračinovo, thus removing the strategic threat to the capital.

== Controversies ==
During the crisis, there were American citizens behind militant lines in Aračinovo. Russian sources claimed Ukrainian involvement in the battle for Aračinovo.

According to representatives from NATO and the closest associates of President Trajkovski, the evacuation of the insurgents from Aračinovo was demanded personally by the President, in order to prevent the escalation of the conflict into a civil war. Since the start of the operation in Aračinovo, NATO Secretary-General Lord George Robertson described the Macedonian assault on NLA held Aračinovo as "madness" and "complete folly". In a strongly-worded statement, Lord Robertson also urged the government to cease hostilities as Macedonia, he warned, was "on the brink of bloody civil war". According to NATO representative Peter Feith, as well as to U.S. General Anthony Tate, the Macedonian government decided to ask NATO representatives to negotiate a removal of the NLA forces from the village. The operation was halted and the evacuation was asked by the President Trajkovski, in order to avoid the threat to the capital and to facilitate a speedy resolution of the conflict.

According to former Minister of the Internal Affairs Ljube Boškovski and former Chief of Staff General Pande Petrovski, the halting of the operation of Macedonian security forces happened because of a "NATO ultimatum". Namely, according to General Pande Petrovski, who was in charge of the operation on the Macedonian side, he was called by the President called at 9:00 in the morning on 25 June, and was told that allegedly "NATO General Secretary had called him personally telling him to halt the operation because there were American instructors trapped in Aračinovo". Petrovski, however, ordered the operation to continue. General Petrovski further states that:

Brigadier general Zvonko Stojanovski the commander of the Army Anti-air Defence informed me that our radars caught 6 fighter planes with course from Italy, through Albania towards Macedonia. I told him to follow their course and to dislocate the helicopters to the reserve airfield in Lozovo. I then thought to myself – this is it! NATO is ready to use force on us if we continue with the operation.

Petrovski's description of these circumstances have recently been connected with statements done by Glenn Nye, a state department official in the U.S. Embassy in Macedonia. Namely, during the 2002 congressional elections in the US, Nye revealed that while assigned to Macedonia and Kosovo, in 2001 he organised the rescue of twenty-six American citizens who were trapped behind insurgent lines.

Researchers Mark Curtis and Scott Taylor, claim that the foreigners who Nye mentions were advisors from the American military company MPRI. A statement confirmed by American military journalist, US army colonel and war veteran David H. Hackworth who claims sources in the US army in Kosovo confirm that the mission to save the NLA rebels from imminent destruction was to save '17 US instructors' who were either former US officers or members of MRPI. However, commentators including former Presidential Advisor Stevo Pendarovski, who was spokesperson for the Ministry of Internal Affairs at the time of the conflict, have dismissed such claims as mystifications and conspiracy theories, stating that there have been no American instructors at Aračinovo.

=== Protests in Skopje ===
The same night in front of the parliament building in Skopje a protest, organised by ethnic-Macedonian refugees from Aračinovo, escalated into a mass revolt after they were joined by members of the security forces and thousands of civilian protesters. The protesters were joined by the policemen from the Avtokomanda (a suburb in Skopje, close to Aračinovo) who had taken part in the battle. They came armed with guns and automatic rifles and were demanding to know why the operations had been halted and the insurgents allowed to be evacuated.

Protesters broke into the Parliament building and demanded to talk to the President shouting "treason" and "resignation", and deriding Trajkovski's decision to allow the rebels to take their weapons when they retreated. The demonstrators broke through a cordon of police, hurled stones through windows, and completely destroyed Minister of Interior Boshovski's Mercedes parked in front of the building. A few police and journalists were wounded in the melee, though none appeared to be seriously hurt. Police did not use force in attempting to calm the crowd.

== See also ==
- Aračinovo ambush
