= Beqir Sadiku =

Army commander in the KLA, LAPMB and NLA during the Yugoslav wars

- Born: 8 November 1980; Slupčane, Kumanovo, SR Macedonia, SFR Yugoslavia, (today North Macedonia)
- Died: 22 June 2001 (aged 20); Aračinovo, near Skopje, Republic of Macedonia, (today North Macedonia)
- Military career
- Allegiance: KLA (1998–99); KPC (1999); LAPMB (1999–2001); NLA (2001)
- Service years: 1998–2001
- Rank: Commander
- Nickname: Commander Sllupçani
- Units: 121 Brigade "Ismet Jashari" (KLA, Kosovo); 113 Brigade "Ibrahim Fejzullahu" (LAPMB, Preševo); 113th Brigade "Ismet Jashari" (NLA, Macedonia)
- Wars and battles: Kosovo War; Battle of Paštrik; Preševo Valley Conflict; 2001 insurgency in Macedonia; Battle of Slupčane; Battle of Orizare; Battle of Matejče; Battle of Aračinovo †

Beqir Sadiku (8 November 1980 – 22 June 2001) also known as Commander Sllupçani, was an Albanian commander and prominent fighter of the Kosovo Liberation Army (KLA) and the National Liberation Army (NLA). He played a significant role in the Kosovo War, the Insurgency in the Presevo Valley, and the Insurgency in Macedonia (2001). As a commander he participated in numerous battles such as the Battle of Paštrik, the Battle of Slupčane and the Battle of Aračinovo.

== Early life ==
Beqir Sadiku, was born on November 8, 1980, in the village of Slupčane in the Lipkovo Municipality of the Karadaku region. He came from a well-educated family, with his father working as a teacher at the local school. Beqir completed his primary education in his hometown. Despite his family not being wealthy, they were known for their generosity and patriotic traditions passed down through generations.

== Yugoslav wars ==
=== Kosovo ===
Upon the declaration of general mobilization by the Kosovo Liberation Army, Beqiri joined the ranks of the KLA. Initially he assigned to the 121st Brigade of the Paštrik Operative Zone, with whom he participated in numerous battles such as the Battle of Paštrik, demonstrating bravery and heroism. Beqiri remained at the frontlines until the liberation of Kosovo in June 1999.

=== Preševo ===
Following the liberation of Kosovo and the establishment of the Kosovo Protection Corps, Beqir Sadiku, along with other experienced fighters, joined the ranks of these forces. Like many others, Beqir initially became involved in the struggle of the Liberation Army for Presevo, Medvegja, and Bujanoc (LAPMB). During the Preševo Valley conflict, he held a prominent position within the 113th Brigade "Ibrahim Fejzullahu" in the Upper Zone of Presevo, where he served as the commander of the artillery squad. Among his comrades, Beqir was known by the nickname "Commander Sllupçani".

=== Macedonia ===
Following the decision to demobilize after the signing of the Končulj Agreement in May 2001, Beqir Sadiku returned to his homeland, now representing the emblem of the National Liberation Army. He formed a combat platoon and organized the defense of his village against the Macedonian forces. The Battle of Slupčane and Orizare erupted on 3 May 2001, where after a month of heavy fighting, he would manage to hold on to the villages of Slupčane and Orizare, when Macedonian forces held all of their operations in the Karadak region. After the withdrawal of Macedonian troops in the Lipkovo-Karadak region, Beqiri, together with a significant portion of the 113th Brigade, captured Aračinovo on June 12, 2001. This capture marked a turning point in the Macedonian conflict, leading to the heaviest battle and crisis throughout the entire conflict. On June 22, 2001, Macedonian forces launched a massive attack against the NLA. During the battle, Beqiri sustained injuries and later died in the hospital on the same day. Despite being heavily outnumbered, the NLA managed to defend the village and repel the Macedonian forces.

== See also ==
- Kosovo War
- Preševo Valley conflict
- Macedonian Conflict
