= Xhemail Rexhepi =

Albanian commander (died 2015)

- Died: 23 July 2015; Kumanovo, Macedonia
- Military career
- Allegiance: National Liberation Army
- Rank: Commander
- Nickname: "Commander Shqiponja"
- Unit: Special Unit "Shqiponjat"
- Conflicts: Battle of Matejče

Xhemail Rexhepi, also known as Commander Shqiponja, was a commander of the National Liberation Army (NLA).

Rexhepi became a member of the Democratic Union for Integration (DUI). In September 2014, Rexhepi announced his candidacy to become president of DUI's branch in Kumanovo. He was shot and killed in a cafe in Kumanovo's Bedinje neighborhood on 23 July 2015. Two other persons who were with him were wounded. Bajram Limani, who was acting head of DUI in Kumanovo, told Alsat that he and his supporters acted in self-defense and had been attacked by Rexhepi's group in his office, and surrendered to the police. DUI condemned the killing. In 2017, the Kumanovo court sentenced Limani to 7 years and 3 months in prison, 5 years for murder, and 2 years and 3 months for illegal possession of weapons. However, he became a fugitive.
