= Gëzim Ostreni =

KLA/NLA General

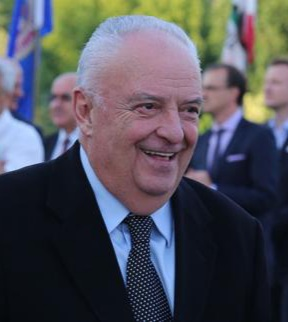

Personal details
- Born: 1 November 1942 Debar, Italian protectorate of Albania (today North Macedonia)
- Party: AA
- Other political affiliations: DUI

Military service
- Allegiance: Kosovo Liberation Army; Kosovo Protection Corps; National Liberation Army
- Years of service: 1998–2001
- Rank: Commander
- Battles/wars: Kosovo War; 2001 insurgency in the Republic of Macedonia; Battle of Tetovo; Operation MH

Gëzim Ostreni (born 1 November 1942) is a former KLA and NLA general. Ostreni is known for participating in the Kosovo War and the 2001 insurgency in the Republic of Macedonia.

== Life ==
Gëzim Ostreni was born in the city of Debar (Diber) in present-day North Macedonia on 1 November 1942. After finishing primary school, he also finished the school of reserve officers as well as some military courses at the Military Academy. He graduated from the Faculty of Philosophy and Sociology in Pristina (Prishtina). In the military field, he served as the commander of the territorial defense in Diber. He participated in the Kosovo War and gradually started climbing up the ranks. In 2000, he was promoted to Major General. As part of the Kosovo Liberation Army (KLA), he commanded the group's operations in the Metohija (Dukagjin) plain of western Kosovo. After the war, he served in the Kosovo Protection Corps before returning to Macedonia. Ostreni was also a military historian, having studied the Second World War partisan resistance in Macedonia. Like many ethnic Albanians, he saw no future for himself in the new Macedonian Army, whose officer corps were dominated by Macedonians. In the spring of 2001 he joined the National Liberation Army (NLA), where he united guerrilla groups from Kosovo and North Macedonia. With the start of the armed conflict in Macedonia he assumed the role of Chief of the General Staff of the National Liberation Army which was created by Albanians in North Macedonia. Until April 2001, he was also a deputy commander in the Kosovo Protection Corps. Ostreni played a prominent role in the battle of Tetovo. He cited discrimination against Albanians as a motive for participating in the conflict in Macedonia. After the Ohrid agreement was signed, he left the National Liberation Army. In June 2002, he became part of the presidium of the newly founded Democratic Union for Integration (DUI). In 3 October, he became a deputy of the Assembly of Macedonia. In 2004, he became a candidate of DUI for the presidency of the Macedonian state, but was defeated by Branko Crvenkovski and Sasko Kedev. From 2002 to 2006, he was the vice president of the Macedonian Assembly. In 2015, along with Zulfi Adeli, he created a new political party called "Unity". The party was later merged into Alliance for Albanians (AA).
