= Battle of Slupčane =

Battle during the 2001 insurgency in Macedonia

- Part of the 2001 insurgency in Macedonia
Date	2 May – 11 June 2001
Location	Slupčane, Macedonia
Result	NLA victory

Belligerents
National Liberation Army	Macedonia

Commanders and leaders
Jakup Asipi; Beqir Sadiku; Sead Ramadani; Nazmi Sulejmani; Jetullah Qarri; Lefter Koxhaj	Boris Trajkovski; Pande Petrovski; Ljube Boškoski

Units involved
113th Brigade "Ismet Jashari"; Skanderbeg special unit	Macedonian Army: Macedonian Police; "Tiger" Special Police Unit

Strength
100 militants	Unknown; Unknown; 3 T-55 tanks 2 Mil Mi-24s

Casualties and losses
11 militants killed	5 soldiers killed
- 10 Albanian civilians killed by Macedonian shelling

The Battle of Slupčane (Macedonian: Битка за Слупчане, Albanian: Beteja e Sllupçanit) was a military confrontation between the Macedonian security forces and Albanian insurgents belonging to the National Liberation Army (NLA), which at the time, was launching a campaign of guerrilla attacks against facilities of the Macedonian Government, the Macedonian Police force, and the Macedonian Armed Forces. The NLA was victorious, in part due to the withdrawal of Macedonian forces and suspension of all military operations in Kumanovo–Lipkovo region so that international officials could inspect the water supply.

== Battle ==
=== Initial NLA attack and Macedonian response ===
On 3 May 2001, the NLA infiltrated the villages of Slupčane and Vaksince, killing two Macedonian soldiers and capturing another one. This caused an almost immediate response by the Macedonian government, who launched an assault against the NLA in Slupčane and Vaksince. The Macedonian Army used Mil Mi-24s and tanks with the goal of driving the NLA out of Slupčane. However, the advance stalled when the NLA was not showing any signs of withdrawal. According to a NLA commander, during the assault, five Albanian civilians were killed.

=== Operation MH-2 ===
The most intensive clashes occurred during the first large-scale offensive in Kumanovo, code-named Operation MH-2, on 8 May 2001, at the entrance of the village. Macedonian Army infantry launched an onslaught, deploying one mechanized battalion and using heavy artillery and Mil Mi-24s, causing some NLA rebels to leave their positions. The offensive started on 8 a.m but was stopped by Boris Trajkovski at 2 p.m, leaving the NLA in control of the village.

=== Continued fighting and Macedonian shelling ===
On 13 May, Macedonian forces launched an operation to dislodge rebel positions at Slupčane and Vaksince. The Macedonian Army claimed to have hit two NLA columns, killing 30 insurgents.

From 14 to 16 May, Macedonian forces engaged rebel positions close to Slupčane. The Macedonian army described the action as the "worst fighting" since 3 May.

On 17 May, the Macedonian Army pounded the village with artillery from a safe distance, but ceased shelling after firing six rounds.

On 22 May, NLA rebels attacked Macedonian positions near Slupčane and Vaksince. Macedonian forces responded by shelling the village. The NLA claimed that six civilians were wounded and that the minaret of the mosque in Vaksince had been destroyed.

=== Third Macedonian assault ===
On 24 May, the Macedonian military stormed insurgent positions to reclaim control of ten NLA-held villages in Kumanovo and Karadak region. The operation utilized tanks, artillery, and helicopter gunships to attack the NLA strongholds of Slupčane and Vaksince, as well as their mountain positions beyond, beginning at 8am. In response, the NLA unleashed a barrage of machine-gun fire. During the assault 10 members of an Albanian family were killed by Macedonian shelling, among the dead were women and children.

On 26 May, Macedonian forces managed to retake Vaksince and claimed to have recaptured Lojane, but they were unable to regain control over Slupčane. Macedonian forces continued to blast Slupčane with helicopter gunships and heavy artillery, NLA rebels responded with mortars, wounding two Macedonian soldiers. Although the Macedonian Army entered Vaksince, they were driven out of the village by the NLA, only three days after the initial assault.

=== Fourth Macedonian assault ===
From 30 May to 1 June, Macedonian security forces carried out another assault to capture Slupčane, using APC's and T-55 tanks. The village was also shelled on a daily basis. The operation was called off, after the "Tiger" Special Forces unit mutinied and had to be withdrawn from the front line, leaving the NLA in control of the village.

=== Ambush near Slupčane ===
On 6 June, NLA insurgents ambushed Macedonian troops near Slupčane, killing five soldiers.

=== Halting of operations by Macedonian forces ===
On 11 June 2001, the Macedonian Army received orders to halt all military operations in the Kumanovo-Lipkovo region. Following a Macedonian attack and ensuing clashes on 10 and 11 June, which left one Macedonian commander (Siniša Stoilov) and one civilian dead, the Macedonian army ceased all of its bombardment of positions held by the NLA. Hostilities in the vicinity of Slupčane, Orizare, and Matejce also had diminished shortly after.

== Aftermath ==
On 5 July NLA militants from Slupčane launched attacks on Macedonian Army sites near Kumanovo.
