= Ambush near Tanuševci =

Part of the 2001 insurgency in Macedonia

- Part of the 2001 insurgency in Macedonia
Date	March 4, 2001
Location	Near Tanuševci, Macedonia
Result	NLA victory

Belligerents
National Liberation Army	Macedonia

Commanders and leaders
Unknown	Kirčo Dimitrov †

Units involved
Unknown	Macedonian Army

Strength
Unknown	Unknown

Casualties and losses
None	3 soldiers killed 1 vehicle destroyed

On March 4, 2001, Albanian militants of the NLA, carried out an ambush near the village of Tanuševci during the Insurgency in Macedonia.

== Background ==
On February 17, 2001, fighting broke out in the village. By March 1, 100 Albanian militants had occupied Tanuševci.

== Ambush ==
Albanian militants planted landmines on a road leading to Tanuševci. At 7:30 AM, an ARM vehicle hit the landmines, killing two soldiers. At 8 AM, the rebels opened fire on military forces, killing one soldier.

== Aftermath ==
The European Union condemned the attack. Due to the ambush, Macedonia closed its border with Kosovo. Macedonian authorities sent around 3,000 to 4,000 men to tackle the rebels, but within days the rebellion spread around nearby villages. Around 500 residents of Tanuševci, mainly women and children, fled into Kosovo.
