= Neprošteno =

Neprošteno Непроштено Nepreshten
- Village
- Location within North Macedonia
- Coordinates: 42°03′N 21°01′E
- Country: North Macedonia
- Region: Polog
- Municipality: Tearce

Population (2002)
  - Total: 1,309
- Time zone: UTC+1 (CET)
  - Summer (DST): UTC+2 (CEST)
- Car plates: TE
- Website: .

Neprošteno (Macedonian: Непроштено, Albanian: Nepreshten) is a village in the municipality of Tearce, North Macedonia.

== History ==
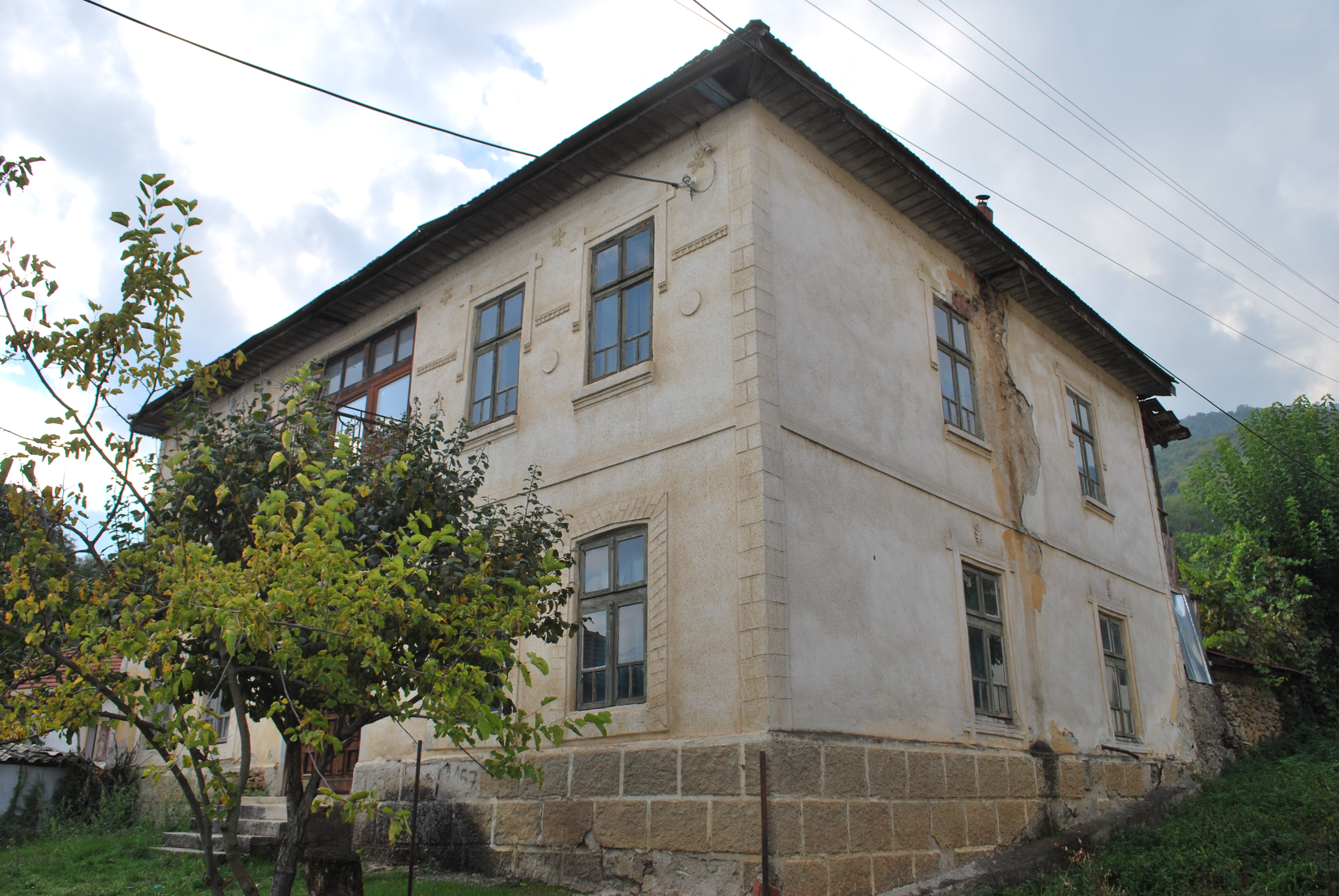
Traditional building in Neprošteno

According to Bulgarian ethnographer Vasil Kanchov in 1900 the village was home to 680 inhabitants of which 580 were Bulgarian Christians and 100 were Albanian Muslims.

According to revolutionary and ethnographer Gyorche Petrov in the Ottoman period, Neprošteno was divided by a small river into two mahalas, one inhabited by Bulgarians and the other inhabited by Albanians, who were characterized as being involved in hajduk activity. The Bulgarian mahala was on the right side and the Albanian mahala was on the left side of the river. The village exported beans, fruit but most famously chestnuts. It had two churches, one old and one new.

During the inter-ethnic conflict in 2001, four ethnic Macedonian inhabitants of the village were kidnapped by the National Liberation Army whose whereabouts are unknown to this day.

== Demographics ==
According to the 2002 census, the village had a total of 1,309 inhabitants. Ethnic groups in the village include:

- Albanians 898
- Macedonians 405
- Serbs 2
- Others 4
