= Battle of Tanuševci =

Battle between the NLA and Macedonian security forces

- Part of the 2001 insurgency in Macedonia
Date	16 February – 1 March 2001
Location	Tanuševci, Macedonia
Result	NLA victory
Territorial changes	NLA captures Tanuševci on 1 March 2001

Belligerents
National Liberation Army	Macedonia

Commanders and leaders
Xhezair Shaqiri	Unknown

Units involved
113th Brigade "Ismet Jashari"	Macedonian Army

Strength
100 militants	Unknown

Casualties and losses
8 killed (2 killed by KFOR forces)	Unknown

The Battle of Tanuševci was the first gun battle between the National Liberation Army (NLA) and the Macedonian security forces in the insurgency in Macedonia.

== Background ==
Rebels belonging to the National Liberation Army (NLA) attacked Tearce's police station, resulting in the death of one policeman and injuries to three others. This incident ultimately triggered the 2001 Insurgency in Macedonia.

== Battle ==
The village of Tanuševci became involved in conflict on 17 February 2001, when masked NLA militants entered the area and kidnapped a TV filming crew. In response, Macedonian police attempted to enter the village on the same day but were met with fierce gunfire from the NLA militants, sparking the beginning of the battle in the village. On February 26, 2001, Macedonian forces engaged in battle with the NLA that lasted for several hours. Ultimately, the Macedonian forces succeeded in forcing the NLA to retreat across the border into Kosovo. Shortly after their retreat to Kosovo, the NLA made another attempt to gain control over the village once more and as of 1 March 2001, the NLA expelled the Macedonian forces and established control over Tanuševci.

== Aftermath ==
On 2 March, NATO provided reassurances to Macedonia, stating that it was actively monitoring the activities of a group of approximately 100 ethnic Albanian insurgents who had taken control of the village of Tanusevci after the Battle. Additionally, NATO restated its commitment to the matter.

On 4 March, NLA insurgents ambushed Macedonian troops near Tanuševci. A police vehicle ran over a mine, killing two Macedonian policemen. The rebels opened fire at army forces, resulting in the death of one soldier.
