= Operation Amber Fox =

Armed conflict in Macedonia

- Part of 2001 insurgency in Macedonia
- Operational scope: Stabilization of Government control of country
- Location: Republic of Macedonia
- Commanded by: Brig Gen Heinz-Georg Keerl
- Date: 27 September 2001 to 15 December 2002
- Executed by: NATO, sanctioned by the UN

Operation Amber Fox also known as Task Force Fox was a NATO-led operation in the Republic of Macedonia, led by Germany and the Netherlands and initially under the command of German Brigadier General Heinz-Georg Keerl. It followed on from Operation Essential Harvest, another NATO operation.

== History ==
The background for a NATO operation was the perceived need to provide international military protection in crisis situations to the international observers who were active in Macedonia following the Ohrid agreement and Albanian insurgency in the spring of 2001. These observers were important for the stabilization of the Macedonian state.

In a letter dated 18 September 2001, the Macedonian President Boris Trajkovski asked the NATO Secretary General for a NATO military presence in the country, which should assist in the security of the international observers working there following the conclusion of Operation Essential Harvest.

On receipt of the letter from President Trajkovski, NATO developed Operation Plan 10417 Amber Fox, which was approved by the NATO Council on 26 September 2001. The letter from President Trajkovski represents the legal basis of the operation. The operation was also in accordance with the Charter of the United Nations and sanctioned in its resolution No. 1371 of 26 September 2001, the United Nations Security Council approved the operation which, at the request of the Macedonian government, created a multinational security presence in the country.

The mission officially started on 27 September 2001 with a three-month mandate, with the German army initially taking control. In June 2002 the Netherlands took over command. 700 soldiers, 600 of them Germans, were deployed to achieve the initial objectives of the operation. Of these, 300 were permanently stationed in the republic on the Vardar River. The mission finally ended on 15 December 2002.

On 16 December 2002, the reduced size successor, Operation Allied Harmony commenced, which strove to enable Macedonia to guarantee security throughout the country within its own resources.
