= Jetullah Qarri =

Kosovar military commander

- Born: 1 April 1958; Ferizaj, FPR Yugoslavia
- Died: 13 March 2018 (aged 60); Malishevë, Kosovo
- Military career
- Allegiance: Kosovo Liberation Army (KLA) (1998–1999); National Liberation Army (NLA) (2001)
- Service years: 1998–2001
- Nickname: Kommandant Guri
- Units: 114th Brigade (NLA), 60th Brigade (KLA)
- Conflicts: 2001 insurgency in Macedonia; Operation MH-2; Battle of Slupčane

Jetullah Qarri, also known as Komandant Guri, was a prominent figure in the Kosovo Liberation Army (KLA) and the National Liberation Army (NLA). He was a commander of the 60th Brigade of the KLA and the 114th Brigade of the NLA was known for his actions in the Nerodime and Pashtrik regions. Qarri was one of the most emblematic fighters of the KLA and the NLA.

Qarri was born in a small village in Ferizaj, FPR Yugoslavia, on 1 April 1958 and lived through poverty.

In 2016, Qarri found out he had a life-threatening illness. He died on March 13, 2018, from his illness.
