= Ambush near Aračinovo =

- Part of the prelude to the insurgency in Macedonia (2001)
- Location: Police checkpoint at the entrance of Aračinovo, Macedonia
- Date: 11 January 2000; 26 years ago
- Target: Macedonian Police
- Attack type: Drive-by shooting
- Deaths: 3 Macedonian policemen
- Accused: 10 suspects

An ambush was carried out against the police of the Republic of Macedonia near the predominantly Albanian-inhabited village of Aračinovo, located just outside of the capital Skopje, on 11 January 2000. The drive-by style attack occurred during the heightened tensions following the Kosovo War and is considered the first major event leading up to the beginning of the insurgency in Macedonia in 2001. The Albanian National Army claimed responsibility for the attack.

== Attack ==
On the night of 11 January 2000, three police officers Erol Gotak, Kiril Petruševski and Aco Angelovski were killed at a checkpoint near the village of Aračinovo, located near Skopje, Macedonia. The assailants emerged from vehicles waiting at the checkpoint and opened fire with automatic weapons before fleeing the scene. Aračinovo, a village with a predominantly ethnic Albanian population, became the focus of the subsequent police investigation. All individuals searched or detained in connection with the attack were ethnic Albanians. The victims, however, were non-Albanians; two of the slain officers were ethnic Macedonians, while the third was an ethnic Turk. The bodies of the dead policemen were also reported to have been mutilated, according to the Macedonian witness who first discovered them.

== Aftermath ==
The ANA released a communiqué in February 2000, claiming responsibility for the attack. The killing of three police officers near the Albanian village of Aračinovo led to some of the worst police abuses in Macedonia since the 1997 riots and crackdown in Gostivar and Tetovo. After the attack, Macedonian police assaulted numerous ethnic Albanian residents and vandalized property in Aračinovo. One of the three suspects arrested in connection with the murders died in police custody. Human Rights Watch reported that nine other suspects were also arrested, beaten while in custody, and some were coerced into signing confessions. An investigation by the Office of the Ombudsman that year concluded that the police had used excessive force in Aračinovo and recommended an internal inquiry. Another suspect who got released was killed in 2009. While some families received compensation for property damage, the government has not held the responsible officers accountable for the abuse. In the following months, three Macedonian police stations in ethnic Albanian areas were attacked, though any connection to the incident remained unclear. The key witness in the trial of the Albanian suspects, surviving Macedonian police officer Goran Novkovski, stated that the police had been informed they were participating in a special operation to locate stolen luxury vehicles. During the operation, they were sent without body armor, gas masks, or automatic rifles, and they also lacked a flashlight, forcing them to inspect vehicles using a lighter. According to his testimony, the assailants responsible for the police killings were in an Opel Kadett. All the suspects have been released due to lack of evidence.

== See also ==
- 2001 insurgency in Macedonia
- Aračinovo crisis
