= Battle of Nikuštak =

Military engagement in 2001

- Part of the 2001 insurgency in Macedonia
Date	27 June – 5 July 2001
Location	Nikuštak, Macedonia
Result	NLA victory
Territorial changes	Nikuštak remains under NLA control

Belligerents
National Liberation Army	Macedonia

Commanders and leaders
Unknown	Boris Trajkovski; Ljube Boškoski; Blagoja Markovski

Units involved
Unknown	Macedonian Army; Macedonian Police

Casualties and losses
Unknown	Unknown
- Nikuštak mosque destroyed by Macedonian shelling

Battle of Dobrosin

A military engagement in 2001 between the National Liberation Army (NLA) and the Macedonian Army occurred in the village of Nikuštak, Macedonia. Macedonian forces launched a large-scale offensive in Nikuštak on 27 June 2001.

== Background ==
Shortly before the battle, NLA rebels were evacuated to Nikuštak, after the Battle of Aračinovo.

== Battle ==
On 27 July, the NLA launched an attack on Macedonian army positions at Umin Dol, located just east of Nikuštak. The NLA reportedly had used mortars, snipers, and automatic fire upon the Macedonian forces. A few hours later, the Macedonian Army initiated an offensive and employed various weapons, including artillery and tanks, to combat the NLA in Nikuštak.

On 28 June, Kosovo Force soldiers apprehended 90 suspected NLA rebels along Kosovo's border region with Macedonia, who had arrived from Nikuštak. This action was taken following NATO's decision to deploy 3000 soldiers to Macedonia to resolve the conflict and restore peace.

Fighting continued, and on 2 July, as part of the offensive, Macedonian forces fired 80 rockets at NLA positions within the village.

On 4 July, there were clashes near the village, where according to the Macedonian army, the militants were regrouping.

On 5 July, a nationwide ceasefire deal was reached between the NLA and the Macedonian government under the auspice of NATO. The NLA retained control over Nikuštak.

== Aftermath ==
As a result of the Macedonian shelling and heavy fighting, the village was heavily damaged, while the Nikuštak mosque was destroyed. The rebels in Nikuštak were disarmed by NATO in late August after a peace deal was reached. In December, the Macedonian police restored their presence in the village with the Organization for Security and Co-operation in Europe's assistance.
