= Tearce attack =

2001 attack in Tearce

- Part of 2001 insurgency in Macedonia
Date	22 January 2001
Location	Tearce, Macedonia
Result	NLA victory

Belligerents
National Liberation Army	(North Macedonia) Macedonia

Commanders and leaders
Unknown	Unknown

Units involved
112th Brigade	Macedonian Police

Casualties and losses
None	1 policeman killed 3 injured

The Tearce attack was an attack carried out by the National Liberation Army on a Macedonian police station in Tearce, North Macedonia. This attack marked the beginning of the 2001 insurgency in Macedonia. As a result of the attack, one police officer was killed and three others were injured.

== Attack ==
The attack took place on 22 January 2001, on a Monday at 2:00 AM in the village of Tearce, which is inhabited largely by ethnic Albanians. During the attack, three or four NLA militants armed with a Chinese rocket launcher and two Kalashnikovs attacked a Macedonian police station. The militants killed the police officer Momir Stojanovski in the attack, who was killed by the rocket propelled grenade, while three other policemen were seriously injured. The injuries were believed to have been sustained from the two grenades fired at the station.

== Aftermath ==
The NLA claimed responsibility for the attack. After the attack in Tearce, the village was captured and held by the NLA. However, Macedonian police reported that the militants operated independently. Police spokesman Stevo Pendarovski reported, "These extreme radical individuals are not part of an organised group."

The attack in Tearce resulted in the beginning of the insurgency. It was designated as a terrorist attack by the Macedonian Ministry of Interior. On 22 October, the Macedonian police re-entered Tearce with the assistance of OSCE and EU.
