= Gračani, North Macedonia =

Gračani Грачани Graçan
- Village
- Location within North Macedonia
- Coordinates: 42.088398°N 21.292926°E
- Country: North Macedonia
- Region: Skopje
- Municipality: Ǵorče Petrov

Population (2002)
  - Total: 0
- Time zone: UTC+1 (CET)
  - Summer (DST): UTC+2 (CEST)
- Car plates: SK
- Website: .

Gračani (Macedonian: Грачани, Albanian: Graçan) is a village in the municipality of Ǵorče Petrov, North Macedonia. It is located close to the Kosovan border.

== Demographics ==
The 1981 Yugoslav census recorded 357 Albanians and 1 other inhabiting the village. The 1994 Yugoslav census was the last to record any people as residing in the village which contained 21 inhabitants, all Albanians. The village has experienced heavy depopulation in recent times. According to the 2002 census, the village had 0 inhabitants.
