= Testimonies 2001 =

Book by Pande Petrovski

- Author: Pande Petrovski
- Cover artist: Vesna Filipovska
- Language: Macedonian
- Series: War and Politics
- Subject: 2001 insurgency in the Republic of Macedonia
- Publisher: Kiro Dandaro
- Publication date: 2006
- Publication place: Republic of Macedonia
- Media type: Print
- Pages: 234
- ISBN: 9989-785-82-1
- Dewey Decimal: 355.48(497.7)

Testimonies 2001 (Macedonian: Сведоштва 2001, romanized: Svedoštva 2001) is a book written by Macedonian general Pande Petrovski in 2006.

== Synopsis ==
The general explains the American role in the crisis through Military Professional Resources Inc.'s (MPRI) proposals for reorganizing the Army of the Republic of Macedonia (ARM) and the Ministry of Defense which revealed the strategy of America of preparing Republic of Macedonia for a defeat from the inside in case of war. Petrovski also describes his conversation with president Boris Trajkovski after he was asked to come back and rejoin the armed forces before the conflict started.

On the question from the General:

Why you have retired me when I did not fulfil the conditions for it?

The president answered:

General, when I was elected president I didn't know you generals. Richard Griffiths Major General of the United States, brought me a list of tasks to do included in which were which generals to retire, so I signed the list.

== Media attention ==
А mother of one of the victims of the Macedonian defense forces stated that even one month after the publishing of the book it can't be found in any books stores in the capital Skopje, she had to go directly to the publisher's office for a copy.

== See also ==
- 2001 insurgency in the Republic of Macedonia
- List of books about Albanian terrorism in 2001 in Macedonia
