= Šipkovica =

Šipkovica Шипковица Shipkovicë
- Village
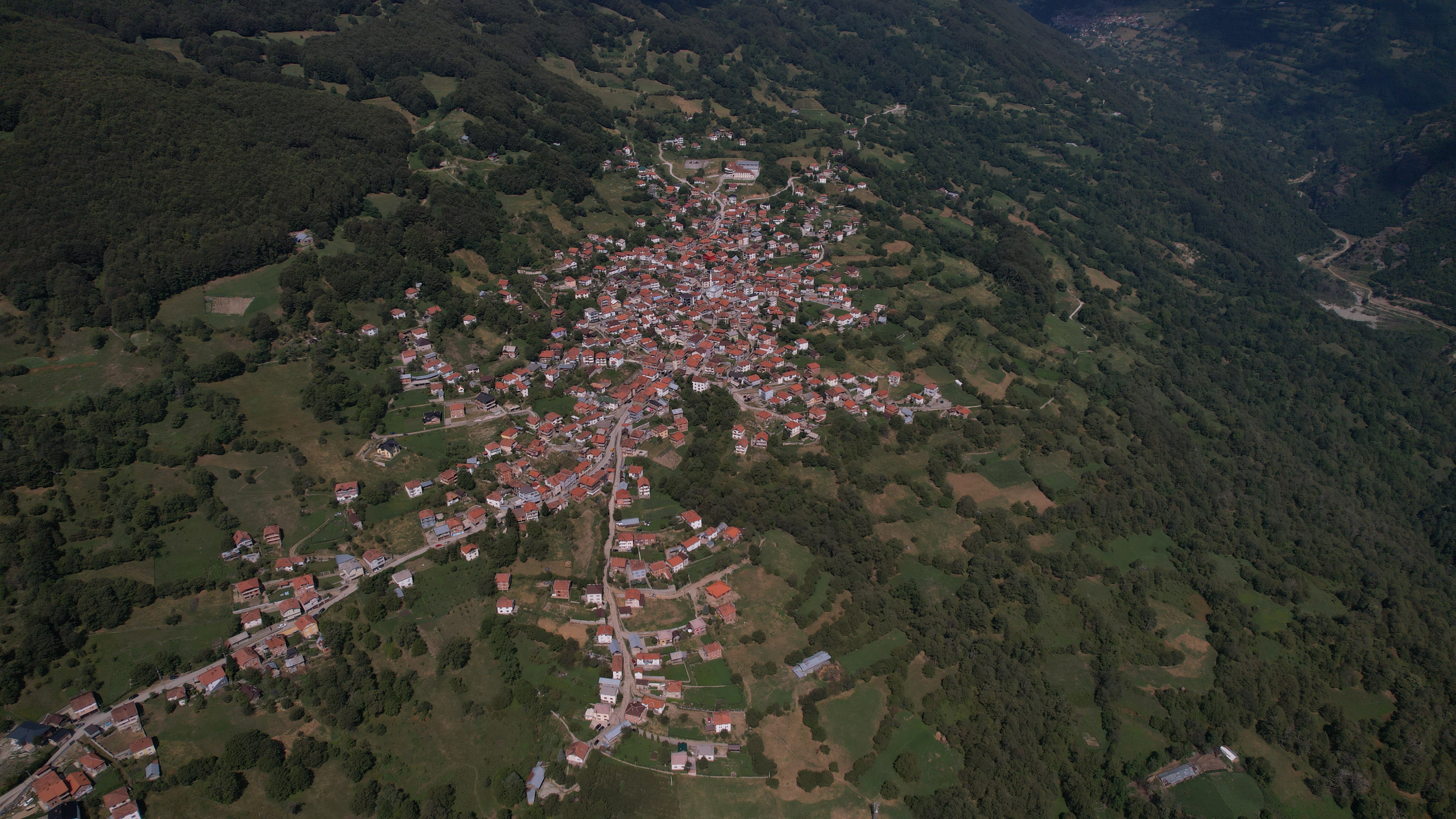
- Air view of the village

- Location within North Macedonia
- Coordinates: 42°02′06″N 20°54′56″E
- Country: North Macedonia
- Region: Polog
- Municipality: Tetovo

Population (2021)
  - Total: 1,540
- Time zone: UTC+1 (CET)
  - Summer (DST): UTC+2 (CEST)
- Car plates: TE
- Website: .

Šipkovica (Macedonian: Шипковица; Albanian: Shipkovicë) is a village in the municipality of Tetovo, North Macedonia. Its FIPS code was MK91.

== Demographics ==
According to the 2021 census, the village had a total of 1.540 inhabitants. Ethnic groups in the village include:

- Albanians 1.483
- Others 57

Year	Macedonian	Albanian	Turks	Romani	Vlachs	Serbs	Bosniaks	Others	Total
2002	...	2.817	...	...	...	...	...	9	2.826
2021	...	1.483	...	...	...	...	...	57	1.540

According to the 1942 Albanian census, Šipkovica was inhabited by 572 Muslim Albanians.

In statistics gathered by Vasil Kanchov in 1900, the village of Šipkovica was inhabited by 550 Muslim Albanians.
