= Pande Petrovski =

Macedonian general (1943–2006)

General Pande Petrovski
- Панде Петровски
- Born: 26 December 1943; Village Živojno, Bitola, Kingdom of Bulgaria (modern North Macedonia)
- Died: 31 December 2006 (aged 63)
- Military career
- Allegiance: SFR Yugoslavia; 1962–1992; Republic of Macedonia; 1992–2002
- Branch: Yugoslav People's Army; Army of the Republic of Macedonia
- Service years: 1962–2001
- Rank: General
- Commands: Army of the Republic of Macedonia
- Conflicts: 2001 insurgency in the Republic of Macedonia; Battle of Tetovo; Battle of Vaksince; Operation MH; Operation MH-1; Operation MH-2; Aračinovo crisis; Battle of Raduša; Bojane attack; Battle of Otlja; Čair ambush; Vejce Ambush

Pande Petrovski (Macedonian: Панде Петровски; 26 December 1943 – 31 December 2006) was a Macedonian general and the Chief of Staff of the Army of the Republic of Macedonia. He was most famous for being the strategist that planned the military actions of the Macedonian security forces during the 2001 insurgency in the Republic of Macedonia. He is the author of the book Testimonies 2001.

== See also ==
- 2001 insurgency in the Republic of Macedonia
- Operation MH - 1
- Operation MH - 2
- Operation Vaksince
- Operation Arachinovo
- Operation Radusha

Military offices
Preceded by Jovan Andrevski	ARM Chief of General Staff; 2001	Succeeded by Metodi Stamboliski
