= Lopate, Kumanovo =

Lopate Лопат Llopat
- Village
- Location within North Macedonia
- Coordinates: 42°09′N 21°40′E
- Country: North Macedonia
- Region: Northeastern
- Municipality: Kumanovo

Population (2021)
  - Total: 2,063
- Time zone: UTC+1 (CET)
  - Summer (DST): UTC+2 (CEST)
- Car plates: KU
- Website: .

Lopate (Macedonian: Лопат, Albanian: Llopat) is a village in the municipality of Kumanovo, North Macedonia.

== Demographics ==
As of the 2021 census, Lopate had 2,063 residents with the following ethnic composition:

- Albanians 1,597
- Macedonians 366
- Persons for whom data are taken from administrative sources 70
- Serbs 29
- Others 1

According to the 2002 census, the village had a total of 2,448 inhabitants. Ethnic groups in the village include:

- Albanians 1,886
- Macedonians 478
- Serbs 80
- Others 4
