= Ljubodrag =

Ljubodrag Љубодраг Lubidragi
- Village
- Location within North Macedonia
- Coordinates: 42.118056°N 21.661111°E
- Country: North Macedonia
- Region: Northeastern
- Municipality: Kumanovo

Population (2021)
  - Total: 718
- Time zone: UTC+1 (CET)
  - Summer (DST): UTC+2 (CEST)
- Postal code: 1327
- Car plates: KU
- Website: .

Ljubodrag (Macedonian: Љубодраг, Albanian: Lubidragi) is a village in the municipality of Kumanovo, North Macedonia.

== Demographics ==
As of the 2021 census, Ljubodrag had 718 residents with the following ethnic composition:

- Macedonians 452
- Serbs 147
- Albanians 86
- Vlachs 1
- Others 12
- PWDTAS 20
