= Operation Essential Harvest =

2001 NATO operation in North Macedonia

Operation Essential Harvest (or Task Force Harvest) was a deployment mission in the Republic of North Macedonia by NATO, officially launched on 22 August 2001, and effectively started on August 27. Because national contributions were larger than expected, the force ultimately grew to approximately 4,800 troops. Troops from 2nd Battalion, The Parachute Regiment, 9 Parachute Squadron RE, members of the SAS and a reconnaissance squadron from the Royal Canadian Dragoons working in the A.O.R. The operation was headquartered in a fruit processing plant called Tri Kruši in Dracevo.

== Background ==
"Although France was not a member of the NATO integrated command structure, then President Chirac had begun to reintegrate into the military structure of the Alliance in order to allow for French participation in combined operations in Bosnia under NATO command. . . . At the summit in Freiburg on 12 June, Chirac's suggestion for military cooperation with German units within NATO was confirmed by Schröder and put in place by the foreign and defence ministers of the two countries on 5 July. Both countries cooperated in NATO Operation Essential Harvest – two German, two French and one Spanish companies were placed under the overall French Command."

== Battle of Tetovo ==
The Battle of Tetovo occurred in the beginning of January 2001 which also involved NATO and the Macedonian Armies to disarm Albanian insurgents who had occupied a number of cities, towns and villages in the Republic of Macedonia. This battle lasted until November 2001.

During the operation, Sapper Ian Collins of 9 Parachute Squadron RE was killed when a concrete block thrown at his vehicle by Macedonian youths struck him on the head.

== Operation Amber Fox ==
Following the conclusion of Operation Essential Harvest and at the request of the Macedonian President, NATO established Operation Amber Fox, to allow for a continuing NATO presence in the country.

== See also ==
- 2001 insurgency in Macedonia
