= Orizari, Lipkovo =

Orizari Оризари Orizare
- Village
- Location within North Macedonia
- Coordinates: 42°09′43″N 21°37′08″E
- Country: North Macedonia
- Region: Southeastern
- Municipality: Lipkovo

Population (2021)
  - Total: 1,692
- Time zone: UTC+1 (CET)
  - Summer (DST): UTC+2 (CEST)
- Car plates: KU
- Website: .

Orizari (Macedonian: Оризари, Albanian: Orizare) is a village in the municipality of Lipkovo, North Macedonia.

== Demographics ==
As of the 2021 census, Orizari had 1,692 residents with the following ethnic composition:

- Albanians 1,666
- Persons for whom data are taken from administrative sources 26

According to the 2002 census, the village had a total of 2,094 inhabitants. Ethnic groups in the village include:

- Albanians 2064
- Macedonians 3
- Others 27

== Notable people ==
- Ismet Jashari
