= Xhezair Shaqiri =

Macedonian politician (born 1965)

- Born: 15 May 1965; Tanuševci, SR Macedonia, SFR Yugoslavia
- Military career
- Allegiance: Kosovo Liberation Army; National Liberation Army
- Service years: 1998–2001
- Rank: Commander
- Nickname: Commander Hoxha
- Units: 138th Brigade "Agim Ramadani"; 171st Brigade “Kadri Zeka” 113th Brigade "Ismet Jashari"
- Conflicts: Kosovo War; Battle of Glođane; Operation Fenix; Operation Eagle; 2001 insurgency in Macedonia; Battle of Tanuševci; Brest attack; Lipkovo crisis; Aračinovo crisis
- Other work: Deputy, special adviser

Xhezair Shaqiri (Macedonian: Џезаир Шаќири; born 15 May 1965), also known as Commander Hoxha, is a Macedonian politician of Albanian descent, former member of the Kosovo Liberation Army (KLA) and commander of the National Liberation Army (NLA).

== Life ==
Xhezair Shaqiri was born on 15 May 1965 in Tanuševci, SR Macedonia, SFR Yugoslavia. In 1998 he joined the KLA as a soldier. During his participation in the Kosovo War, he first participated in the Battle of Glođane, in which the Yugoslav Army was defeated and had to retreat. He later was put into a unit under the command of Agim Ramadani with who he fought the Yugoslav Army during the Koshare ambush. In 1999, he was active in Tanuševci, where he led the 2nd Battalion of the 171st Brigade of the KLA. During this period, Tanusevci gained notoriety as one of the KLA's most significant arms depots.

After the Kosovo War, he joined the National Liberation Army (NLA) during the 2001 insurgency in Macedonia, becoming one of the first NLA commanders and was active in the Karadak region mainly in the villages of Tanuševci, Lipkovo and Aračinovo. He led the first NLA group into Tanuševci in mid-February. During the insurgency Shaqiri was suspected of kidnapping a local Macedonian mayor. According to the Macedonian Ministry of Interior, he was the direct perpetrator of the murder of a police officer, in the shopping center Chairchanka in Skopje. After the war, he joined the party National Democratic Party, taking some of his former soldiers with him. He was also a deputy in the Macedonian parliament. In 2007, he claimed to be in control of Tanuševci, wanting to secede and join Kosovo.

On 24 July 2001, he was placed on the Macedonian blacklist of citizens and 3 days later he was placed on the blacklist list of US President George W. Bush.

In May 2018, then-Macedonian Prime Minister Zoran Zaev appointed him as an adviser to the office of prime minister in the field of internal security and radicalism. VMRO-DPMNE condemned his appointment. He resigned from the position due to the public reaction against him.
