= Matejče =

Matejče Mateç Матејче
- Village

- Location within North Macedonia
- Coordinates: 42.1256°N 21.5978°E
- Country: North Macedonia
- Municipality: Lipkovo

Population (2021)
  - Total: 2,961
- Time zone: UTC+1 (CET)
  - Summer (DST): UTC+2 (CEST)
- Car plates: KU
- Website: .

Matejče (Macedonian: Матејче; Albanian: Mateç) is a village in the municipality of Lipkovo, North Macedonia. The village is known for the Orthodox Monastery of the Most Holy Mother of God, in the Skopska Crna Gora, at a height of 1005 metres, which was built in the 14th century.

== Demographics ==
According to the statistics of the Bulgarian ethnographer Vasil Kanchov from 1900, 400 inhabitants lived in the village of Matejche, of which 536 were Albanians, 52 Romani and 50 Bulgarians.

According to the Secretary of the Bulgarian Exarchate Dimitar Mišev ("La Macédoine et sa Population Chrétienne"), in 1905 there were 104 Bulgarians in Matejche.

According to the 2002 census, the village had a total of 3394 inhabitants. Ethnic groups in the village include:

- Albanians 3012
- Serbs 325
- Macedonians 17
- Others 39

As of the 2021 census, Matejče had 2,961 residents with the following ethnic makeup:

- Albanians 2,855
- Persons for whom data are taken from administrative sources 100
- Serbs 4
- Macedonians 1
- Others 1
