= Aračinovo =

Aračinovo Арачиново Haraçinë
- Village
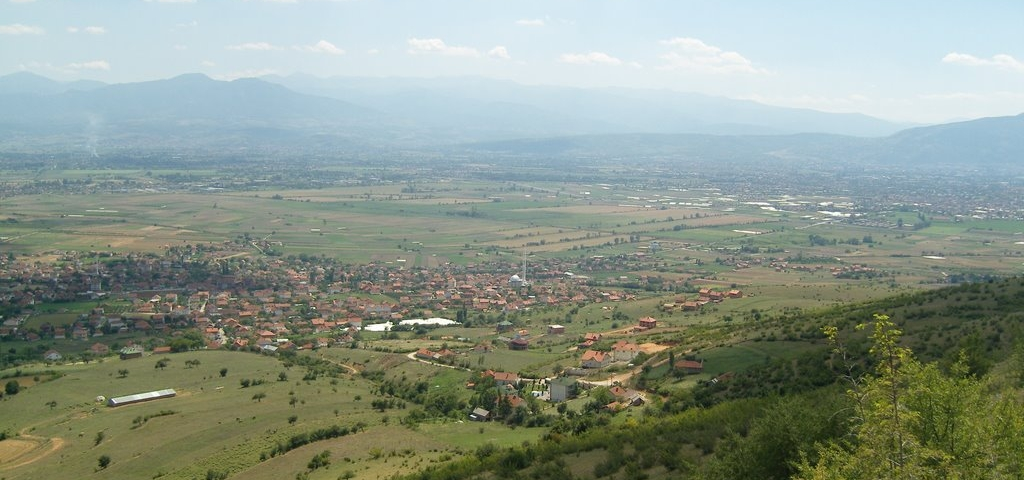
- Panorama view of Aračinovo

- Location within North Macedonia
- Coordinates: 42°01′35″N 21°33′50″E
- Country: North Macedonia
- Region: Skopje
- Municipality: Aračinovo
- Elevation: 267 m (876 ft)

Population (2021)
  - Total: 7,991
- Time zone: UTC+1 (CET)
  - Summer (DST): UTC+2 (CEST)
- Postal code: 1045
- Area code: +389-2-XXXXXXX
- Vehicle registration: SK
- Website: .

Aračinovo (Macedonian: Арачиново [araˈtʃinɔvɔ], Albanian: Haraçinë) is a village and seat of the municipality of Aračinovo, North Macedonia.

== History ==
During the 2001 Macedonia conflict, it was occupied by ethnic Albanian insurgents.

== Demographics ==
According to the 2021 census, the village had a total of 7.991 inhabitants. Ethnic groups in the village include:

- Albanians 7.777
- Macedonians 4

Year	Macedonian	Albanian	Turks	Romani	Vlachs	Serbs	Bosniaks	Others	Persons for whom data are taken from administrative sources	Total
2002	594	6.677	...	...	1	10	2	31		7.315
2021	4	7.777	...	...	...	...	...	...	210	7.991

== Sports ==
Local football club KF Shkëndija currently plays in the Macedonian First League.
