= Ohrid Agreement (2001) =

2001 peace agreement

Ohrid Framework Agreement
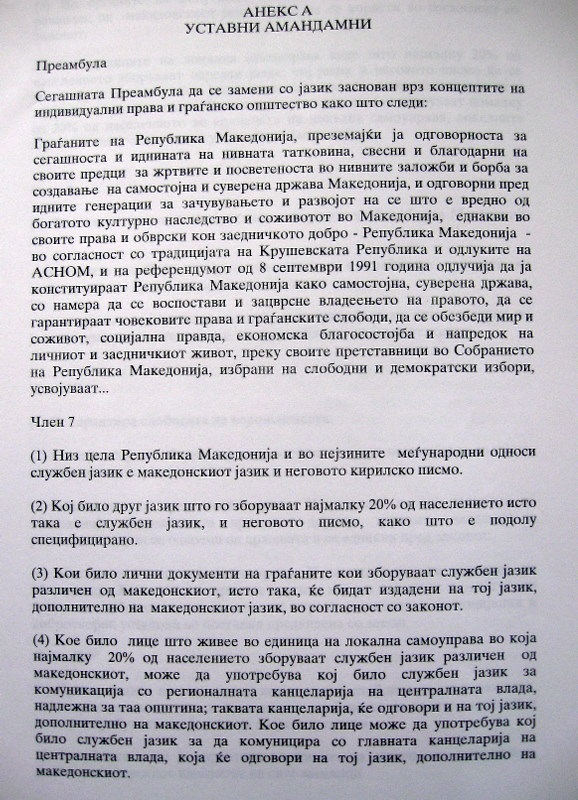
- Annex of Ohrid Agreement
- Type: Peace agreement
- Signed: 13 August 2001
- Location: Ohrid, Macedonia (now North Macedonia)
- Original signatories: Government of Macedonia: Albanian minority representatives
- Languages: English as the only authentic version

The Ohrid Framework Agreement (Macedonian: Охридски рамковен договор, romanized: Ohridski ramkoven dogovor, Albanian: Marrëveshja e Ohrit) was the peace deal signed by the government of the Republic of Macedonia (now North Macedonia) and representatives of the Albanian minority on 13 August 2001. The agreement was signed by the country's four political parties after international mediators demanded their commitment to its ratification and implementation within a four-year period.

== Provisions ==
The Ohrid Agreement created a framework for North Macedonia as a civic state, ending the armed conflict between the National Liberation Army and the security forces of Macedonia. It established basic principles of the state such as cessation of hostilities, voluntary disarmament of ethnic Albanian armed groups, government devolution, and the reform of minority political and cultural rights.

The deal also included provisions for altering the official languages of the country, with any language spoken by more than 20% of the population becoming co-official with the Macedonian language at the municipal level. Only the Albanian language, with an approximate 25% of the population being speakers, currently qualifies as a co-official language under this criterion. The Ohrid Framework Agreement is an example of the adoption of consociationalism.

According to the document, the English-language version is the only authentic version of the Ohrid Framework Agreement. The Government of Macedonia had to adapt the Constitution of Macedonia in order to provide the Albanian minority living in Macedonia with fifteen basic rights. The lead negotiator, on the behalf of the European Union, was François Léotard. James W. Pardew represented the United States.
