= Slupčane =

Slupčane Слупчане Sllupçan
- Village
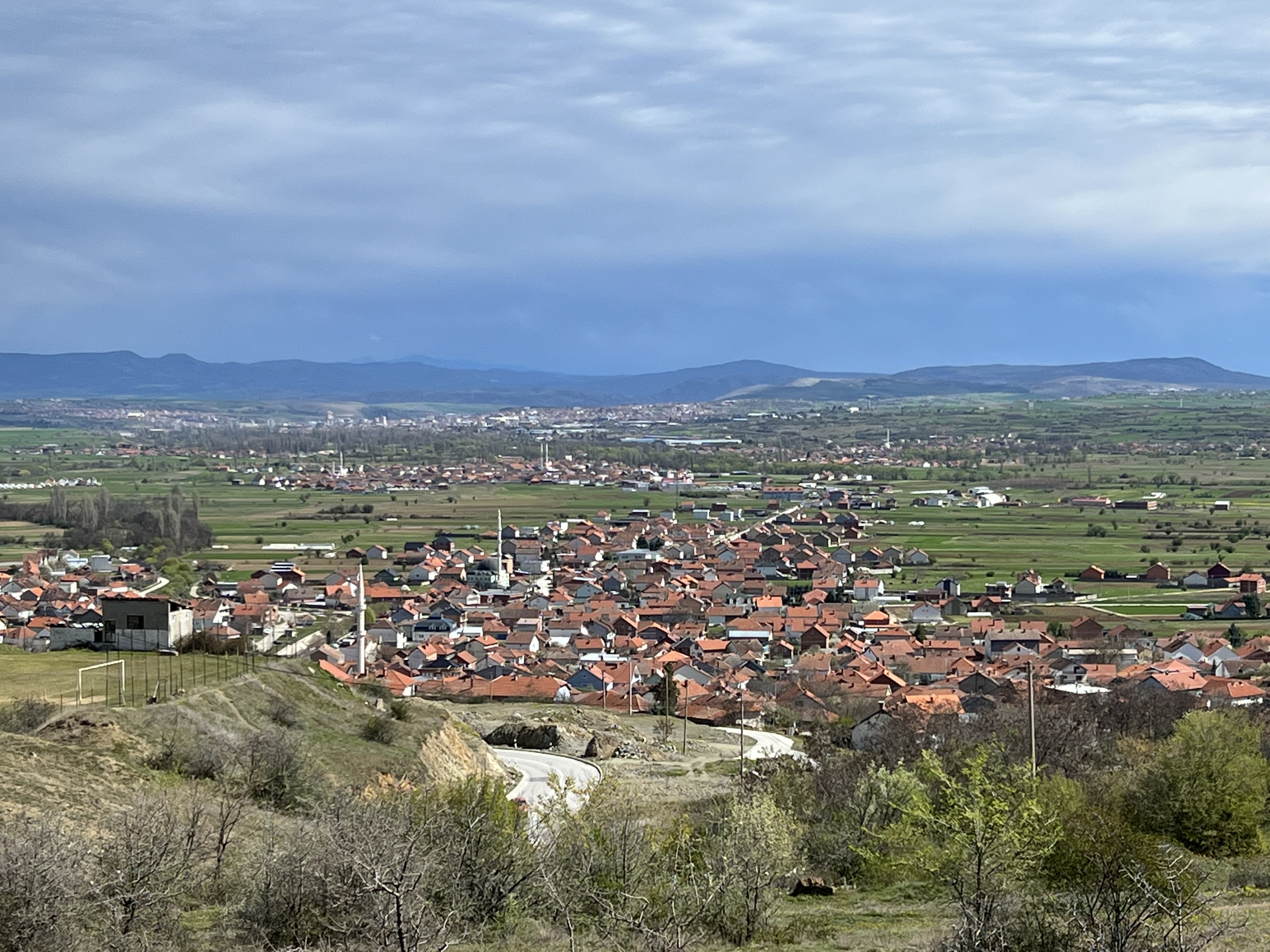

- Location within North Macedonia
- Coordinates: 42°10′N 21°38′E
- Country: North Macedonia
- Region: Southeastern
- Municipality: Lipkovo

Population (2021)
  - Total: 3,654
- Time zone: UTC+1 (CET)
  - Summer (DST): UTC+2 (CEST)
- Car plates: KU
- Website: .

Slupčane (Macedonian: Слупчане, Albanian: Sllupçan) is the largest village in the municipality of Lipkovo, North Macedonia.

== History ==
Descendants of the Krasniqi fis were recorded in the villages of Gošince, Slupčane, Alaševce and Runica in 1965. From May-June 2001 the Battle of Slupčane took place during the 2001 insurgency in Macedonia, it was an NLA victory.

== Demographics ==
As of the 2021 census, Slupčane had 3,654 residents with the following ethnic composition:

- Albanians 3,574
- Persons for whom data are taken from administrative sources 79
- Others 1

According to the 2002 census, the village had a total of 3789 inhabitants. Ethnic groups in the village include:

- Albanians: 3789

== Sports ==
The local football club KF Besa Sllupçan plays in the Macedonian Third Football League.
