= Battle of Vaksince =

2001 battle in Macedonia

- Part of the 2001 insurgency in Macedonia
Date	3 May 2001 – 6 June 2001
Location	Vaksince, Lipkovo, Macedonia
Result	NLA victory
Territorial changes	NLA captured Vaksince on 3 May 2001; Macedonian forces initially regained control over Vaksince on 26 May 2001; NLA recaptured parts of the village on 28 May, but still the majority of the village was under government control; NLA militants finally recaptured the village on 6 June

Belligerents
(North Macedonia) Macedonia	National Liberation Army

Commanders and leaders
Boris Trajkovski; Pande Petrovski; Ljube Boškoski	Fadil Nimani †; Nazim Bushi; Naim Alili; Nazmi Sulejmani; Hajrulla Misini

Units involved
Macedonian Army; Macedonian Special Forces; “Wolves” Battalion; "Scorpions" Unit; Ministry of Interior; Macedonian Police; Special Police Unit "Tigers"	National Liberation Army; 114th Brigade "Fadil Nimani"; 113th Brigade "Ismet Jashari"

Strength
2 Mi-24 helicopters 3 T-55 tanks	50 militants

Casualties and losses
2 soldiers killed 4 soldiers wounded 1 soldier captured	2 militants killed 1 seriously wounded
- 12,000 ethnic Albanian civilians displaced 9,500 fled to Kosovo; 2,500 fled to Serbia

A military engagement between the Macedonian security forces and Albanian insurgents belonging to the NLA occurred in the village of Vaksince, which was at the time launching a campaign of guerrilla attacks against facilities of the Macedonian Government, the Macedonian Police force, and the Macedonian Armed Forces.

== Timeline ==
=== NLA attack and Macedonian counter-offensive ===
On 3 May, the NLA launched an attack on Macedonian security forces in Vaksince, near Kumanovo, killing two Macedonian soldiers and kidnapping a third. The NLA then went on to occupy the village and declared the area in and around Vaksince as a "liberated zone".

On the same day, Macedonian forces decided to launch a counter-offensive to reclaim the village seized by the NLA. Macedonian forces began the offensive with helicopter gunships and artillery that fired on and around the village of Vaksince.

Macedonian Army officials claimed to have managed to destroy fourteen NLA entrenched positions, eight machine-gun bunkers, seven sniper nests, six control points, three arms storage facilities, and one mortar position during the offensive. During the offensive 3 Macedonian soldiers were wounded. The NLA also claimed to have shot down one MI-24 attack helicopter.

Army spokesman Gjorgji Trendafilov told the Associated Press that the NLA was holding thousands of villagers as human shields. This was denied by the NLA, who also accused government forces of indiscriminate attacks against Albanian civilians.

=== Second Macedonian counter-offensive ===
On 24 May 2001, Macedonian security forces launched another general offensive against the NLA in Kumanovo. Fighting continued into the next day and turned into urban warfare. The police and army infantry had to fight for every house in the large villages of Vaksince and Lojane, two NLA strongholds, as the NLA resisted fiercely. A special police unit called the "Tigers", who specialised in urban counter-guerrilla fighting, was also deployed.

On 26 May, NLA rebels withdrew to the hills around Vaksince. With the withdrawal of the NLA, the Macedonian security forces moved in and recaptured Vaksince.

Fadil Nimani the main commander of the NLA in the Kumanovo region, together with his deputy commander, were killed in battle, while one Macedonian policeman was wounded.

Senior army sources confirmed that after the killing of Fadil Nimani, there were a lot of desertions into the ranks of the NLA militants. After the battle the Macedonian government security forces had seized weapons, ammunition and sanitary materials that the militants had left behind.

The Macedonian government said that its security forces had dismantled a group of around 50 NLA militants in Vaksince.

=== NLA counter-offensive ===
While the Macedonian Army captured Vaksince on 26 May, the NLA regained territory in Vaksince within three days. On 6 June, the NLA retook Vaksince, Gjorgji Trendafilov denied that the army had been forced out and claimed that there were no "terrorists" in Vaksince and that the army was still in its positions. Nevertheless, the Macedonian army shelled Vaksince on 6 June, setting a house on fire, which according to CNN would have been unlikely if they still had occupied the area. The claims of Gjorgji Trendafilov as well as other government officials, that claimed, that they had Vaksince under their control, were proven to be false by independent observers as well as the NLA itself. The Vaksince mosque's minaret was demolished from shelling.

On 7 June, Hysamedin Halili (then Mayor of the Lipkovo Municipality) confirmed that the NLA recaptured Vaksince.

== Personnel killed in the battle ==
=== NLA personnel ===
- Fadil Nimani high NLA commander.
- Zaim Zeqiri insurgent.

=== Macedonian personnel ===
- Vlatko Petrov professional soldier.
- Dimitar Dvojakovski professional soldier.

== Aftermath ==
Human Rights Watch concluded that Macedonian forces were arresting and beating Albanian civilians during and after their offensive from 24 to 26 May 2001.

According to the NLA, Macedonian forces attempted to raid Vaksince in October, but were stopped by them.
