= National Liberation Army (Macedonia) =

Albanian paramilitary in the Republic of Macedonia

- Ushtria Çlirimtare Kombëtare
- Leaders: Ali Ahmeti; Gëzim Ostreni; Xhezair Shaqiri; Harun Aliu; Jetulla Qarri; Hajrulla Misini
- Dates active: 1999–2001
- Headquarters: Šar Mountains, Skopska Crna Gora
- Active regions: Northwestern Macedonia and the Skopje statistical region
- Size: 2,000–3,000
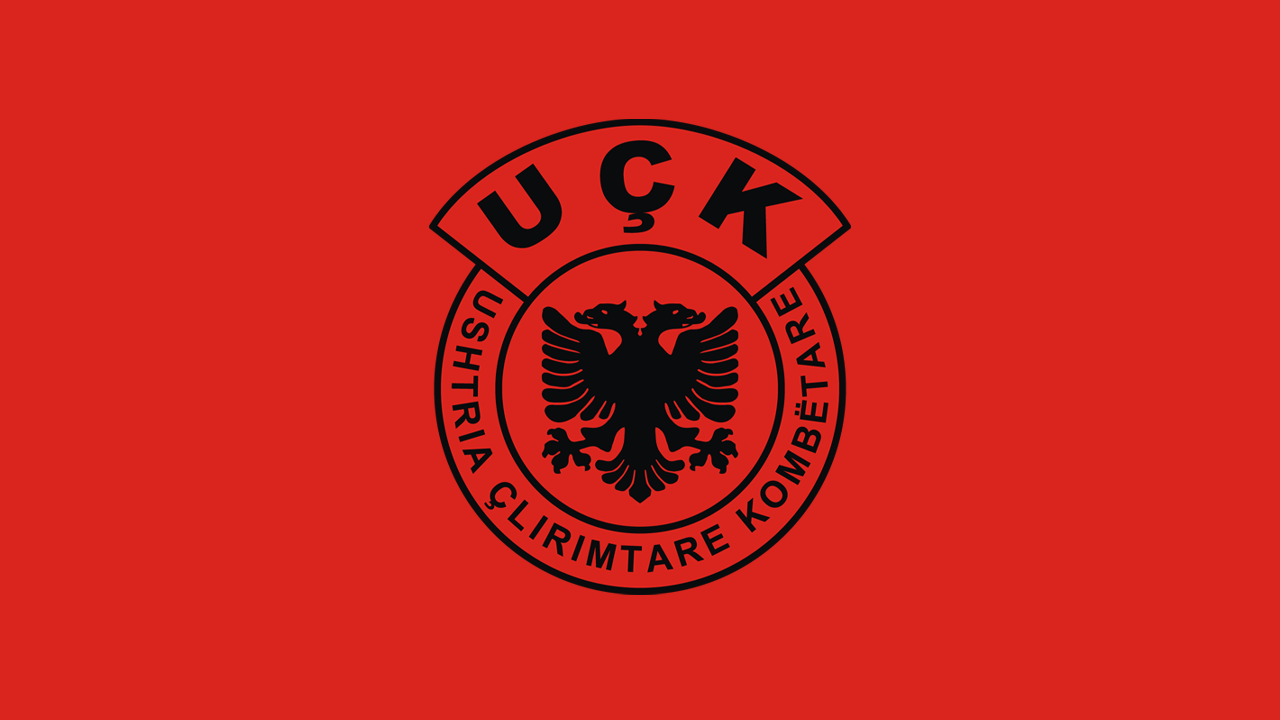
- Flag

The National Liberation Army (NLA; Albanian: Ushtria Çlirimtare Kombëtare, abbr. UÇK; Macedonian: Ослободителна народна армија, romanized: Osloboditelna narodna armija, abbr. ONA), also known as the Macedonian UÇK (Albanian: UÇK Maqedonase; Macedonian: Македонска УЧК, romanized: Makedonska UČK), was an ethnic Albanian militia that initiated the insurgency in the Republic of Macedonia in 2001 and was closely associated with the Kosovo Liberation Army (KLA). Following the insurgency, it was disarmed through the Ohrid Framework Agreement, which gave greater rights and autonomy to the state's Macedonian Albanians.

== Background and foundation ==
In 1992–1993, ethnic Albanians created the Kosovo Liberation Army (KLA) which started attacking police forces and secret-service officials who abused Albanian civilians in 1995. Starting in 1998, the KLA was involved in frontal battle, with increasing numbers of Yugoslav security forces. Escalating tensions led to the Kosovo War in February 1998.

After the end of the Kosovo War in 1999 with the signing of the Kumanovo agreement, a 5-kilometer-wide Ground Safety Zone (GSZ) was created. It served as a buffer zone between the Yugoslav Army and the Kosovo Force (KFOR). In June 1999, a new Albanian militant insurgent group was formed under the Liberation Army of Preševo, Medveđa and Bujanovac (UÇPMB), which started training in the GSZ. The group began attacking Serbian civilians and police, which escalated into an insurgency.

The NLA was founded in 1999 and led by former KLA commander Ali Ahmeti, a nephew of one of the founders of the KLA. Ahmeti organized the NLA from former KLA and UÇPMB fighters from Kosovo, Albanian insurgents from the Liberation Army of Preševo, Medveđa and Bujanovac in Serbia, young Albanian radicals, nationalists from Macedonia, and foreign mercenaries. With the signing of the Končulj Agreement in May 2001, the former KLA and UÇPMB fighters next moved to western Macedonia where the NLA was established, which fought against the Macedonian government in 2001. The acronym was the same as the KLA's in Albanian. According to former NLA leaders, the whole 2001 insurgency in Macedonia was planned in exile near Lucerne, Switzerland, from 1999. A NLA communiqué from 30 January 2000 claimed responsibility for attacks on police stations in Skopje and Oslomej. NLA had the strong support of the Albanian community and many Albanians joined it.

== 2001 insurgency in Macedonia ==
The NLA operated secretly until it began openly engaging the Macedonian military and police. Per the NLA, the goal of the insurgency was to secure greater rights for Albanians. The NLA also demanded a confederate Macedonia. Senior NLA commanders insisted that "We do not want to endanger the stability and the territorial integrity of Macedonia, but we will fight a guerrilla war until we have won our basic rights, until we are accepted as an equal people inside Macedonia." The Macedonian government claimed the NLA was a terrorist organization consisting primarily of KLA fighters, lacking domestic legitimacy and seeking secession or a Greater Albania.

On 22 January 2001, the NLA attacked a police station in Tearce, killing 1 and injuring 3. After the attack, the NLA began to carry out attacks on Macedonian security forces using light weapons. In February, the NLA entered the village of Tanuševci and the conflict expanded to the Kumanovo, Lipkovo and Tetovo region. By the start of March, the NLA had taken effective control of a large swathe of northern and western Macedonia and had come within 12 miles of the capital Skopje.

In March, NLA members failed to take the city of Tetovo in an open attack, but controlled the hills and mountains between Tetovo and Kosovo. In 9 March, the NLA ambushed a police convoy consisting of deputy interior minister Refet Elmazi and secretary of state for interior affairs Ljube Boškoski. On 21 March, the Macedonian government gave the NLA a twenty-four-hour deadline to surrender their weapons or leave the country. NLA announced a ceasefire unilaterally, declaring that it does not want to threaten the territorial integrity of the country and called for a conversation about the rights of ethnic Albanians in the country. However, the government did not want to negotiate with NLA and launched an offensive against it on 25 March. In April, the NLA committed an ambush near Vejce on eight soldiers. On 3 May, a Macedonian government counteroffensive failed in the Kumanovo area. By 8 June, the rebels took Aračinovo, a village outside of Skopje. The NLA threatened to bomb strategic targets, such as the Skopje International Airport and the oil refinery, Okta AD. A ceasefire was mediated by the EU and the NLA was evacuated by NATO to a village under its control, Nikuštak. On 7 August, five NLA rebels were killed in Skopje in a police raid. The NLA ambushed Macedonian reservists near Karpalak on the next day. On 13 August, the Ohrid Agreement was signed between ethnic Macedonian and Albanian representatives, ending the conflict. NLA's leadership was not involved in the negotiations for the agreement but they accepted it.

=== Composition and military capabilities ===
Approximately 400 young Albanian men from Macedonia, including figures like Ali Ahmeti, Gëzim Ostreni, and Xhezair Shaqiri, had fought within KLA's ranks. Many of these fighters later established the NLA, recruiting additional members from Kosovar Albanians, particularly from Prizren (a former stronghold of Ahmeti) and southeastern Kosovo, such as the municipality of Vitina, particularly the village of Debelldeh, which was a key stronghold of the NLA in Kosovo. About 80% of its fighters have been estimated as local Albanians from Macedonia, with only a small number of volunteers coming from Kosovo and the Preševo Valley. The Macedonian government denied that local ethnic Albanians had joined the NLA, while foreign observers and ethnic Albanians in Macedonia argued that the NLA had gained significant support from the local Albanian population.

Ali Ahmeti stated that the NLA comprised 5,000 members during the conflict, including those in logistical roles. Other sources suggest the NLA claimed to have the capacity to mobilize a larger force of up to 16,000, likely to intimidate the government. The Macedonian government estimated around 7,000 rebels, while Kusovac provided a more modest figure of 2,000–2,500 'full-time' combatants. Nonetheless, the NLA had a broader network of supporters involved in tasks such as reconnaissance, patrolling, communications, and logistics. Interviews with former combatants in the spring and summer of 2003 revealed that the NLA's total strength at its peak was between 5,000 and 5,500 troops. However, a distinction was noted between the fully armed front-line forces, numbering 2,800–3,500, and the remaining 2,000 personnel serving as rear-echelon support and logistics staff. According to the combatants, rear-echelon members, if armed at all, typically carried only light weapons, such as pistols. For instance, the NLA reported having two field hospitals staffed by 550 medical personnel, all of whom were unarmed. Members of the Albanian community in Switzerland and Germany raised funding for the NLA through a so-called National Liberation fund (Liria Komberate). The International Crisis Group argued that the NLA was the recipient of funding and weapons linked to criminal groups.

As with the KLA, they were fairly lightly armed – generally with small arms and mortars – though there were later reports that they had acquired SAM-7 anti-aircraft missiles. As the war progressed the rebels managed to acquire heavy weapons including T-55 tanks and armoured personnel carriers captured from Macedonian government forces. The NLA also had thousands of land and anti-tank mines.

=== Organization ===
The NLA claimed to have six brigades active within Macedonia. The 111th, 113th, and 114th Brigades operated in the Skopska Crna Gora (Karadak) region, while the 112th Brigade commanded several battalions in the Tetovo area. The 116th Brigade was responsible for the Gostivar region, and the 115th Brigade was positioned in the northwest of Skopje, including Raduša. In contrast, an OSCE official stated that the NLA had a total of 10 brigades but deployed only the six mentioned above, suggesting that the NLA possessed significant reserve potential.

The six brigades, each with their own commanders were:

- 111th Brigade, unknown commanders
- 112th Brigade "Mujdin Aliu", commanded by Rahim Beqiri
- 113th Brigade "Ismet Jashari", commanded by Xhezair Shaqiri
- 114th Brigade "Fadil Nimani", commanded by Nazim Bushi
- 115th Brigade "Radusha", commanded by Rafiz Aliti
- 116th Brigade "Tahir Sinani", commanded by Tahir Sinani

=== NLA veterans in politics ===
Some former leaders of the NLA have taken positions in politics in North Macedonia.

- Ali Ahmeti, founder of the NLA, is the leader and founder of the third largest political party in North Macedonia, called the Democratic Union for Integration (DUI).
- Gëzim Ostreni, former NLA general, created the political party "Unity", along with Zulfi Adeli. The party was later merged with the Alliance for Albanians (AA) political party in North Macedonia.
- Jakup Asipi, former NLA commander, was elected to be the mufti for the municipalities of Kumanovo and Lipkovo.
- Talat Xhaferi, former NLA commander, who was the Minister of Defense of Macedonia from 2013 to 2014, president of the Assembly of North Macedonia from 2017 to 2024, prime minister of North Macedonia from 28 January to 23 June 2024.

=== Alleged war crimes ===
Conflict areas during the 2001 insurgency in Macedonia

According to Human Rights Watch: "Ethnic Albanian rebels in Macedonia tortured, sexually abused road workers after abducting them from the Skopje–Tetovo highway." Dozens of ethnic Macedonians were kidnapped. Per Amnesty International, while many were released after a short time, 12 people apparently remained missing after the NLA released 14 others in late September. In October, reports suggested that the 12 may have been killed and buried in mass graves near Neprošteno. Another incident is the Vejce ambush, where Albanian guerrillas ambushed and killed eight Macedonian special operatives, part of a patrol of 16 special operatives.

The Macedonian government accused the NLA of bombing a 13th-century Orthodox monastery Sveti Atanasij in the village of Lešok on 21 August 2001. The attack occurred at around 3 am Greenwich Mean Time (GMT). The interior had been gratified and destroyed. NATO military experts said that "the fact that the battery was lying within an area spattered by rubble and wreckage seemed to suggest that it was detonated using a relatively sophisticated timer device;".

The Macedonian government referred four cases against the NLA to the International Criminal Tribunal for the former Yugoslavia (ICTY) in 2002 for investigation:

- 'Mavrovo Road Workers' case – Five road workers from the Mavrovo construction company were abducted on 7 August 2001 and were tortured for eight hours.
- 'Lipkovo Dam' case – The valves of the Kumanovo water supply system at Lipkovo dam were closed down for 40 days in an area under NLA's control, leaving 120,000 citizens without drinking water.
- 'Neproshteno' case – 12 civilians were abducted from various locations around Tetovo in July 2001.
- 'NLA Leadership' case – Command responsibility with a combined charge of multiple war crimes, for which NLA's leadership was accused.

The ICTY returned the cases to Macedonia in 2008.

== Ceasefire and disarmament ==
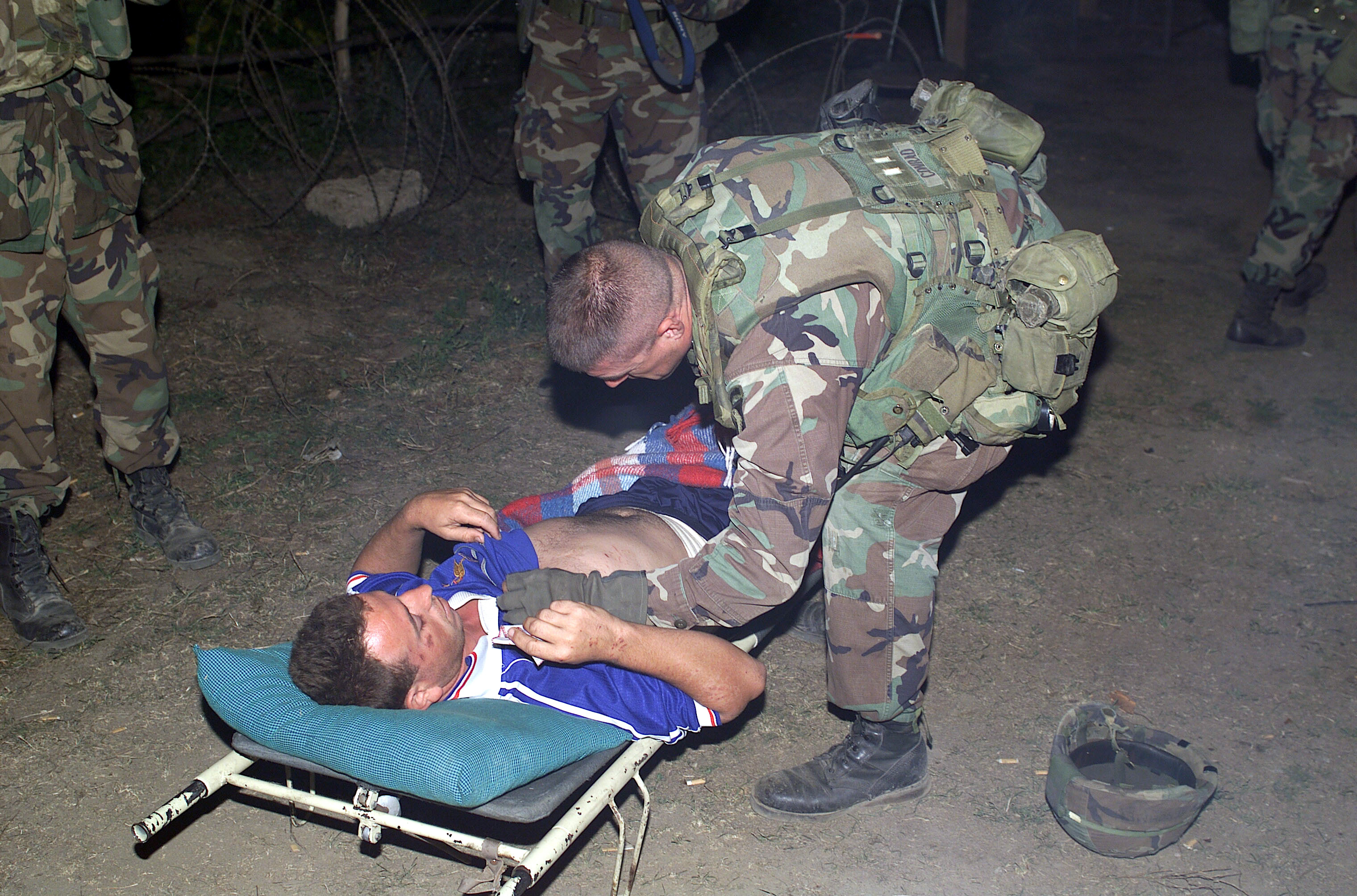
U.S. soldier checks an NLA fighter for any hidden contrabands.

Under the Ohrid Agreement, the Macedonian government pledged to improve the rights of the Albanian population, that make up around 20% of the population. Those rights include making Albanian an official language, increasing the participation of ethnic Albanians in government institutions, police and the army. The Macedonian government also agreed to a new model of decentralization.

The Albanian side agreed to give up any separatist demands and to fully recognize all Macedonian institutions. In addition, the NLA was to disarm and hand over their weapons to a NATO force. The exact number of NLA rebels who were killed is unknown. Per the Macedonian Ministry of Interior, the NLA killed ten civilians.

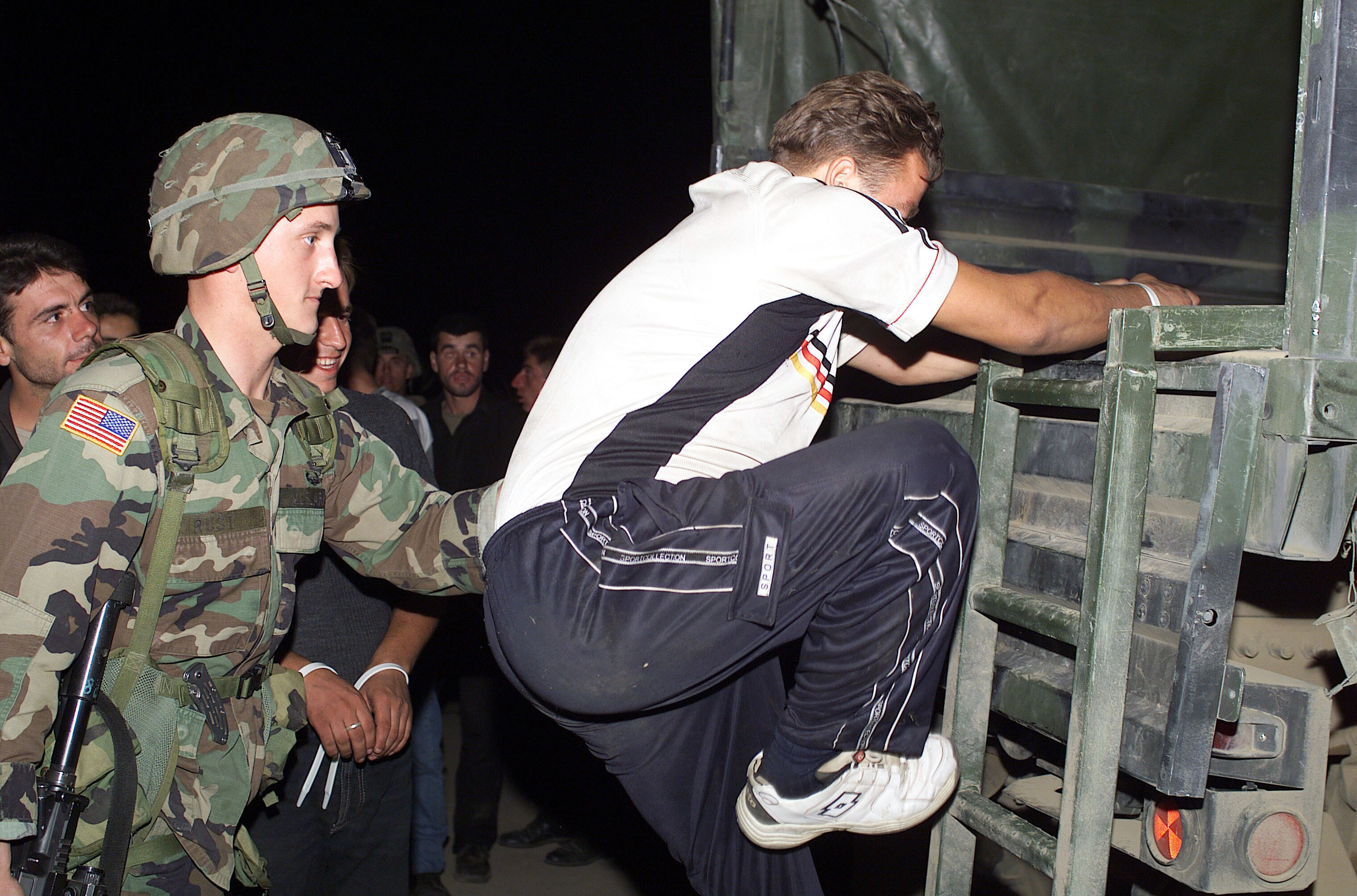
U.S. soldier loading up NLA fighters on a truck heading to a detention center

Operation Essential Harvest was officially launched on 22 August and effectively started on 27 August. This 30-day mission was to initially involve approximately 3,500 NATO troops, a number that went up to 4,200 NATO troops and Macedonian troops, to disarm the NLA and destroy their weapons. In September, the NLA disbanded.

== Equipment ==
| Picture | Type of Weapon | Notes | Quantity | Source |
|---|---|---|---|---|
| | Assault rifles | Mostly AKM's, ASh 78‘s, Zastava M70's, Zastava M59/66's and AK-74's | 5,000–8,000 | |
| | Heavy machine guns | Mostly DShK | 150–250 | |
| | Light machine guns | Zastava M84 | unknown | |
| | Sniper rifles | Zastava M76 | 100–200 | |
| | Surface-to-Air missiles | 9K32 Strela-2's and other variants | 20–50 | |
| | Mortars | 60mm, 80mm and 120mm | 100–200 | |
| | Tanks | T-55's captured from the Macedonian Army | Unknown, 4 APC's and Tanks were collected during Operation Essential Harvest. | |
| | APC's | BTR-60's and TM 170's captured from the Macedonian Army | Unknown, 4 APC's and Tanks were collected during Operation Essential Harvest. | |
| | Landmines | Anti-personnel and anti-tank landmines | 5,000+ | |

== Later developments ==
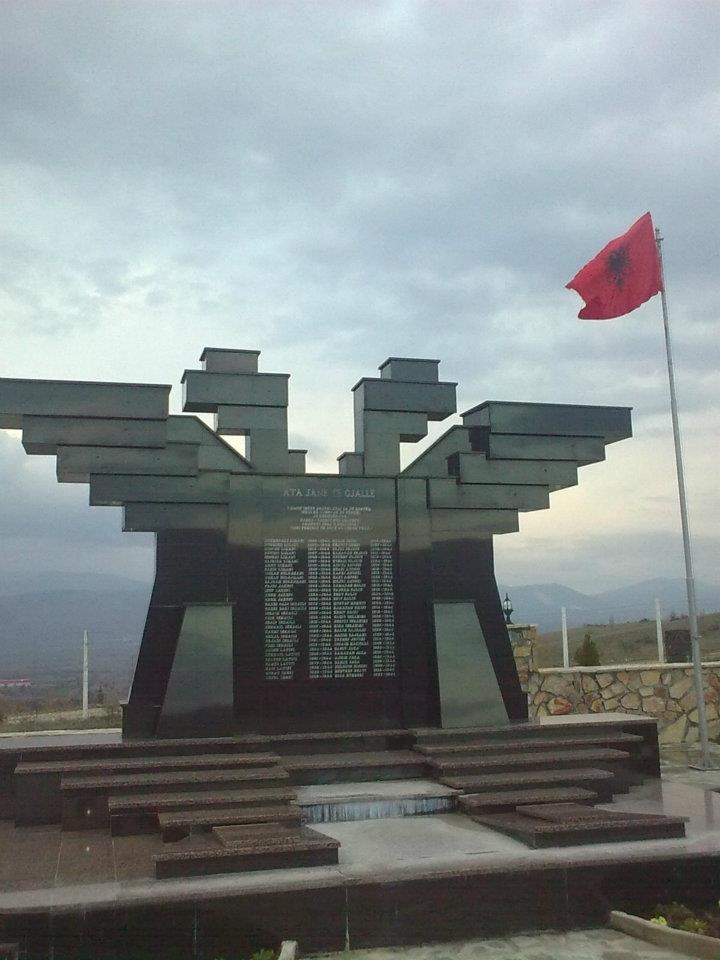
Monument in Sopot of UÇK

In Albanian communities across North Macedonia, monuments dedicated to the NLA were erected. In 2002, the Macedonian parliament approved a general amnesty for former ethnic Albanian insurgents but it only applied for Macedonian citizens. On 26 March 2002, Albanian National Army members attacked former NLA members in the village and former NLA stronghold Mala Rečica near Tetovo. The shootout lasted around two hours and a half. According to some news sources, 1 to 2 militants died in this skirmish. Ali Ahmeti later formed the Democratic Union for Integration (which also included former NLA members), which has been the biggest Albanian political party in North Macedonia.

In April 2010, a weapon cache believed to be intended for group actions was discovered near the border with Serbia; it included uniforms with UÇK marks.

A movement calling itself the NLA claimed responsibility for the 2014 Skopje government attack. The organization, in the letter signed by "Kushtrimi" to the government, claimed that the "Hasan Prishtina" elite force hit the government building in a coordinated action. The organization claims it is dissatisfied with the 2001 Ohrid Agreement.

Bomb attacks were carried out on 9 December 2014 at 8 p.m. near Macedonian police stations in Kumanovo and Tetovo. The Ministry of the Interior announced that in both cases it was not about bombs, but about a kind of explosive device. there were no injuries and no major damage. A private car parked near the train station was damaged. After the attacks, an organization claiming to be the NLA claimed responsibility.

On 21 April 2015, a group of 40 armed men with UÇK patches attacked a border police station at Gošince. The group tied the policemen up and beat them, then stole their arms and communication devices. Before they left for Kosovo, they issued the message: "We are from UÇK. Tell them that neither Ali Ahmeti nor Nikola Gruevski can save you. We do not want any framework agreement and if we see you here again, we will kill you. We want our own state."

On 9–10 May 2015, a series of shootouts happened in Kumanovo between Macedonian police and a group that claimed it was the NLA. Between 50-70 militants were present during the fighting. Ten militants were killed, and reports state they wore uniforms with UÇK insignia, with 30 more being arrested. According to Nikola Gruevski the armed group did not have the support of members of the Albanian minority contrary to the 2001 conflict.

== See also ==
- Timeline of the 2001 insurgency in Macedonia
- List of conflicts involving Albanian rebel groups in the post–Cold War era
- Albanian nationalism in North Macedonia
- Republic of Ilirida
- Liberation Army of Chameria
