= Motorways in North Macedonia =

System of routes in North Macedonia

The road sign informing the motorists they are travelling on an avtopat

The motorways in North Macedonia are called avtopat (автопат / autostradë) and the name, like its translation in most languages, simply means auto road.

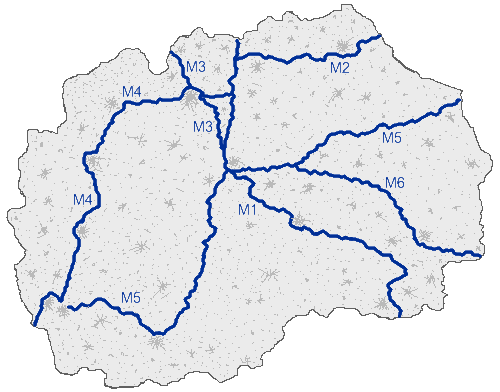
Macedonian Motorways map

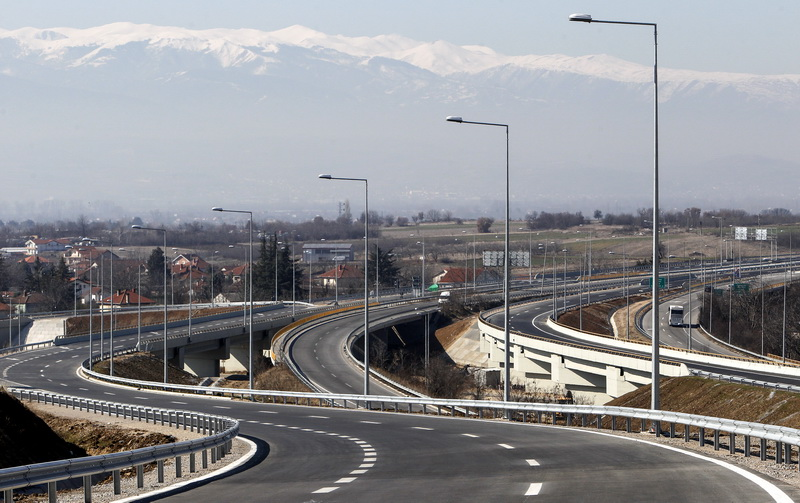
A1/A2/A4 Interchange at Miladinovci, North Macedonia

The system has inherited some from the former Yugoslavia, although new sections have been completely built in the recent years. Pay-tolls (Macedonian: patarini; Albanian: pagesë rrugore) remain in place and the speed limit is 130 km/h (81 mph). The total length of the motorway network as of February 2025 is 317 km, with extra 167 km being under construction. The works on the first couple kilometers of the motorway from Skopje to Kosovo's border started in 2020. The extension of the A2 motorway from Kicevo to Ohrid started in 2014. The part that is supposed to connect Gostivar and Bukojchani, Prilep and Bitola and Trebenishta and Kjafasan started construction by consortium Bechtel & Enka in 2024. Furthermore, most stretches of the existing network have been reconstructed, so overall the Macedonian motorways are in decent shape.

The highways were originally marked with yellow-colour hard shoulder lines and some of these remain in place, they are however slowly being phased out and replaced with white. The motorway roadsigns maintain their green colour background, a feature shared with Switzerland, Italy, Denmark, Sweden, Greece, Czech Republic, Lithuania and the United States as well as the other former Yugoslav republics. The roads are on the whole straight with good surfacing, and better maintained than the national roads.

== List of motorways ==
Motorway	Beginning	Through	End	Length
	North Macedonia Tabanovce, Serbia –	Kumanovo, Skopje,,, Veles	North Macedonia Bogorodica, Gevgelija, Greece Evzonoi –	173 km
	North Macedonia Qafë Thanë, Albania –	Kriva Palanka, Skopje, Tetovo, Gostivar, Kičevo, Struga	North Macedonia Deve Bair, Bulgaria Gyueshevo	306 km
		Kočani,, Štip,, Veles, Prilep, Bitola, Ohrid	North Macedonia Delčevo, Bulgaria Logodazh	305 km
	North Macedonia Blace, Kosovo Hani i Elezit –	Skopje,,,, Štip, Radoviš, Strumica	North Macedonia Novo Selo, Bulgaria Petrich	193 km
Total Motorways: 4				977 km

== Motorway A1 ==
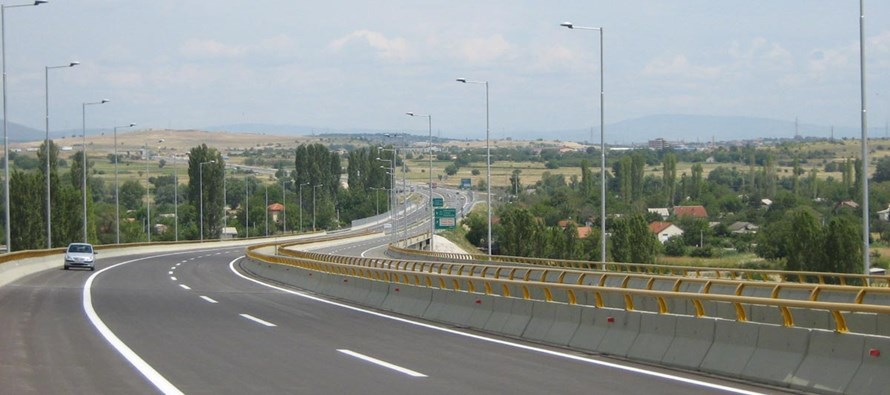
A4 near Volkovo

The first motorway runs from the Tabanovce border crossing with Serbia (for Preševo), passing Kumanovo (A2 junction), Petrovec (Skopje Airport) near Skopje (A3 junction), Veles, Gradsko (A5 junction) Negotino (A7 junction), and continuing onto the main border crossing with Greece, Bogorodica-Evzoni near Gevgelija.

The large part of this express route was built whilst North Macedonia was a part of the SFR Yugoslavia, with the Kumanovo-Petrovec section first opened for traffic in 1979. The motorway was completed in 2004 in time for the 2004 Athens Olympics.

For approximately 30 km between Skopje Airport and Veles, the motorway splits, creating a gradual distance of several kilometres. The northbound route is the postulated motorway route whilst the slightly longer southbound route, with dangerous bends, is the old road and is being used as a freeway as it is only one-way. There are no plans at present to develop the northbound route into two separate carriageways thus perfecting the network.

The motorway A1 is part of European route E75.

== Motorway A2 ==
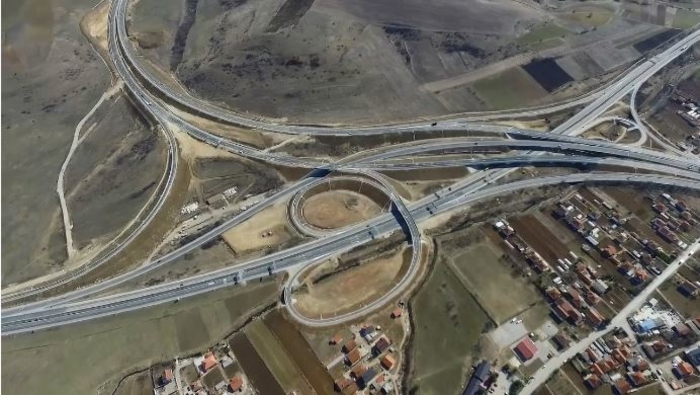
Miladinovci interchange from air

The A2 is a route that connects Kriva Palanka and the Deve Bair border crossing with Bulgaria with Ohrid. The route passes Skopje through the ring-road and enters the already constructed motorway that connects Tetovo with Gostivar. The part of the route that bypasses Kičevo and ends in Ohrid is planned to be turned into a motorway with 4 lanes by October 2026, with one part opening by summer 2025. Currently only the section from Miladinovci (interchange with A1) to Gostivar is a divided motorway, where the Tetovo-Gostivar section (25 km) is missing hard shoulders. The stretch of A2 from Skopje's Ring Road to Ohrid is part of the European corridor E65.

== Motorway A3 ==
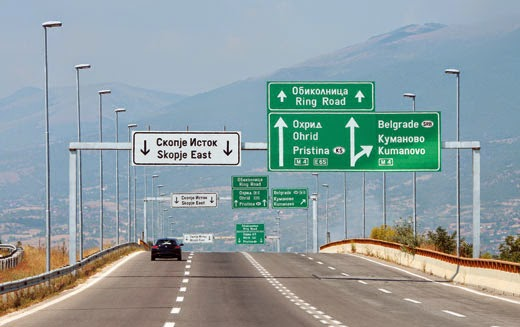
A2 at Skopje Ring Road

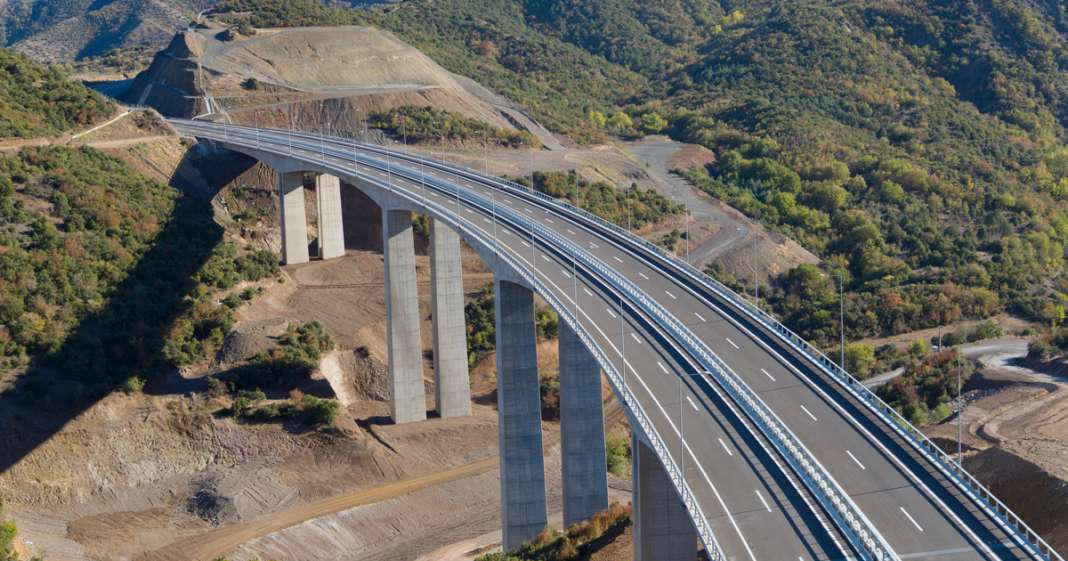
Bridge on the D.Kapija-Smokvica stretch

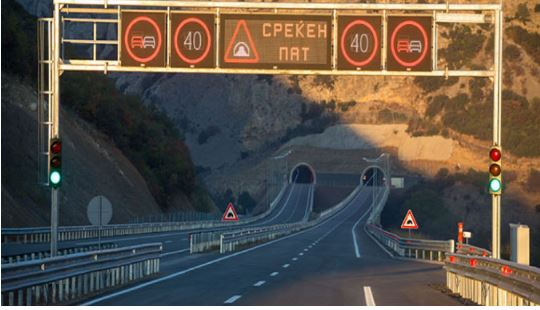
Tunnels on A1

Currently, only a small section of the route A3 is a motorway (the one that goes along A4 from Štip to Kadrifakovo), while some sections are express roads. The route traverses the country from east to west, between the border with Bulgaria near Delčevo, via Kočani, Štip (A4 junction), Veles (A1 junction), Prilep, Bitola, ending in Ohrid (A2 junction). A four lane express road exists in the stretch between Štip and Kočani. In 2024, construction started on the motorway between Prilep and Bitola.

== Motorway A4 ==
The A4 connects Kosovo with Skopje and continues southeast towards Štip, Radoviš, and Strumica, eventually reaching the border with Bulgaria near Novo Selo. The 47 km stretch from Miladinovci to Štip was completed in late 2018, while the works on the Skopje - Blace (Kosovo border) section began in 2020. Further south-east from Štip to Radovis, there is an express road, which could potentially be upgraded to a motorway in the future.

== See also ==
- Transport in North Macedonia
- List of controlled-access highway systems
- Evolution of motorway construction in European nations
