= Harun Aliu =

Commander and co-founder of the Kosovo Liberation Army

- Born: 20 May 1971; Čento, Skopje, SR Macedonia, SFR Yugoslavia
- Died: 12 May 2010 (aged 38); Raduša, Skopje, Republic of Macedonia
- Burial place: Čento, Skopje
- Children: 1
- Military career
- Allegiance: Kosova; National Liberation Army
- Branch: Kosovo Liberation Army; National Liberation Army
- Service years: 1995–2010
- Rank: Commander
- Nickname: Kushtrimi
- Units: 112th Brigade "Mujdin Aliu"; 113th Brigade "Ismet Jashari"
- Conflicts: 2001 insurgency in Macedonia; Battle of Tanuševci; Aračinovo crisis; Battle of Nikuštak
- Other work: Politician

Harun Aliu (Macedonian: Харун Алиу; 20 May 1971 – 12 May 2010), known as Commander Kushtrimi, was an Albanian commander and co-founder of the Kosovo Liberation Army (KLA) during the Kosovo War and the National Liberation Army (NLA) during the 2001 insurgency in Macedonia, who later became a politician in Macedonia (now North Macedonia). He was killed in a shootout near Raduša with the Macedonian police on 12 May 2010.

== Early life ==
Harun Aliu was born on 20 May 1971, in the Čento (Albanian: Hasanbeg) neighborhood of Skopje, and originated from the village of Nikuštak in the Skopska Crna Gora (Karadak) region near Kumanovo. Aliu completed his elementary education in his hometown. In the 1980s, the Yugoslav government abolished the use of the Albanian language in all secondary schools and created mixed schools where instruction was conducted in Macedonian. Aliu refused to attend Macedonian-language classes and traveled to Damascus, Syria, to complete high school. He then returned to Macedonia, where he enrolled as part of the first generation of students at the University of Tetova.

== Political and military activity ==
=== Kosovo insurgency and war (1995-1999) ===
In 1995, at the age of 24, he joined the People's Movement of Kosovo (LPK). In 1998, alongside Beqir Limani, Qemal Shaqiri, and other collaborators, he founded the first cells of the Kosovo Liberation Army (KLA) in Macedonia. From 1995 to 1998, Aliu supplied weapons to members of the KLA. According to some reports, Aliu also participated in the first combat actions of the Kosovo Liberation Army in the 1990s under the leadership of Adem Jashari. On July 22, 1998, Macedonia was rocked by three powerful explosions. One of these blasts targeted the Bit Pazar police station in Skopje, a facility notorious for decades of mistreating Albanians in its cells and offices. The operation was led by him, alongside several of his comrades. The Kosovo Liberation Army claimed responsibility for all armed actions against police stations and courts across various cities in Macedonia. However, in 1998, the group was discovered by intelligence and security services of the Macedonian state. During an action taken by the Macedonian police, some of Aliu's accomplices were imprisoned, while the police killed Beqir Limani from Kičevo in front of his house. At that time, Aliu was in Albania. Realizing that his activities had been uncovered, he decided not to return to Macedonia. He continued his activities in Albania, staying in contact with the leadership of the KLA, which had already activated the armed struggle sector with the goal of organizing the liberation of Kosovo.

=== Founding of the NLA and insurgency in Macedonia (2001) ===
==== Fighting in Tetovo ====
After the end of the Kosovo War, Aliu remained in Albania and, along with other future leaders of the NLA, began organizing an uprising in Macedonia. When the insurgency began, Aliu entered the country in March 2001 and established his headquarters in the village of Selce, Tetova. It was there that he and his unit were based, alongside the General Headquarters of the 112th Brigade, which had already initiated its first operations against Macedonian police and military forces. One of his most important contributions, during his stay in Tetovo, was his participation in the battle of Tetovo in mid-March, during which the NLA took over the Tetovo fortress. However, following Operation MH, most NLA fighters, including Aliu, were forced out of Tetovo. After that, Aliu moved on to fight at Karadak.

==== Fighting in Karadak ====
At Karadak, Aliu participated in various battles, including those in Tanuševci and around Lipkovo, with his most significant contributions occurring during the Battle of Aračinovo.

=== Imprisonment and entrance into politics ===
On 5 September 2001, while in Kosovo, Aliu was arrested and subsequently imprisoned by UNMIK forces, receiving a sentence of four years and was sent to Dubrava prison. After his release, Aliu returned to his family in the Čento (Hasenbeg) neighborhood of Skopje. Upon returning home, Aliu founded the "National Alternative" Party (Albanian: Alternativa Kombëtare) in 2006 as an alternative to the programs of the main Albanian political forces in Macedonia. During his political career, Aliu became a staunch critic of Ali Ahmeti and his party, Democratic Union for Integration. He accused Ahmeti of lacking military experience and claimed that he never participated in any combat during the 2001 insurgency.

=== Aftermath of Operation Mountain Storm ===
After Operation Mountain Storm in November 2007, where six Albanian militants were killed, months later a drive-by ambush occurred on 3 January 2008 targeting the Macedonian "Tigers" special forces. The ambush took place in Skopje's Avtokomanda district, resulting in the death of 40-year-old special forces member Zoran Markovski and the wounding of three others. The gunmen fired from a moving civilian vehicle at a police patrol jeep (Land Rover) and then fled the scene. The police later recovered the vehicle used by the assailants just outside the village of Aracinovo. Inside, they found two automatic rifles, a heavy machine gun, a hand mortar, and several shells. The car had fake license plates. Years later, the Macedonian police accused Aliu of being part of the group responsible for the attack. On February 4, 2010, he was sentenced to life imprisonment. Following the conviction, Aliu went into hiding in the |Karadak mountains, evading the authorities. In several statements, he denied involvement in the attack, claiming it was a politically motivated case orchestrated by the Macedonian government.

=== Shootout near Raduša and death ===
During his time in Karadak, Aliu sought to recruit fellow Albanians to organize resistance against the Macedonian government. However, on May 11, 2010, he and four others were killed near the village of Raduša in Skopje during a firefight with Macedonian police. The incident occurred as the armed group, traveling in a white van loaded with weapons along the Macedonia-Kosovo border, allegedly opened fire on the police. Some Albanian sources claim that the Macedonian police ambushed the van without issuing any warning. Aliu was the leader of the group. US Ambassador to Macedonia Philip Reeker expressed his support for the police action.

== Legacy ==
Aliu's funeral took place in the Čento (Hasenbeg) neighborhood of Skopje, featuring both religious and national ceremonies. The event was attended by thousands of Albanians, including family members, friends, comrades-in-arms, and patriots from Macedonia, Albania, Kosovo, and the Albanian diaspora.

In 2022, a monument honoring him was erected in his place of origin, the village of Nikuštak, located in the municipality of Lipkovo.
