= A4 motorway (North Macedonia) =

Road in North Macedonia

A4

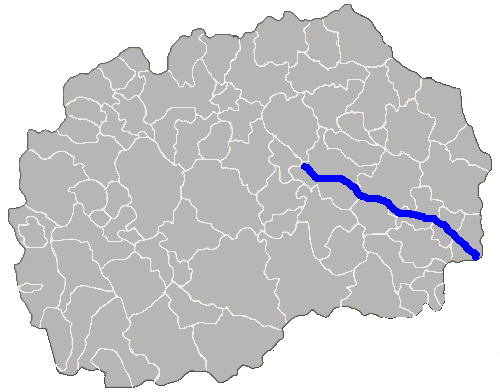

Route information
- Part of E65
- Length: 193 km (120 mi)

Major junctions
- West end: Blace, Kosovo border
- East end: Novo Selo, Bulgarian border

Location
- Country: North Macedonia
- Major cities: Skopje, Štip, Strumica

Highway system
- Transport in North Macedonia

The A4 motorway connects Kosovo with Skopje and continues southeast towards Štip, Radoviš, and Strumica, eventually reaching the border with Bulgaria near Novo Selo. The 47 km stretch from Miladinovci to Štip was completed in late 2018, while the works on the Skopje - Blace (Kosovo border) section will begin in 2020. Further south-east from Štip to Radovis, there is an express road under construction, which could potentially be upgraded to a motorway in the future.

== See also ==
- Motorways in North Macedonia
