= Transport in North Macedonia =

The following is a summary of the transport system of the Republic of North Macedonia.

== Railways ==
total: 925 km (575 mi) (699 km (437 miles) of open track and 225 km (140 mi) of station/industrial track)
standard gauge: 925 km (575 mi) 1.435-m gauge (312 km electrified, all 25 kV 50 Hz)
note: a new 56 km (35 mi) extension of the Kumanovo-Beljakovce line to the Bulgarian border is under construction.

Restructuring of national railway MZ into infrastructure and operating companies completed in July 2007.

=== Railway links with adjacent countries ===
- Serbia - yes
- Kosovo - yes
- Bulgaria - no
- Greece - yes
- Albania - no

=== Maps ===
- UN Map
- UNHCR Atlas Map

== Roads ==
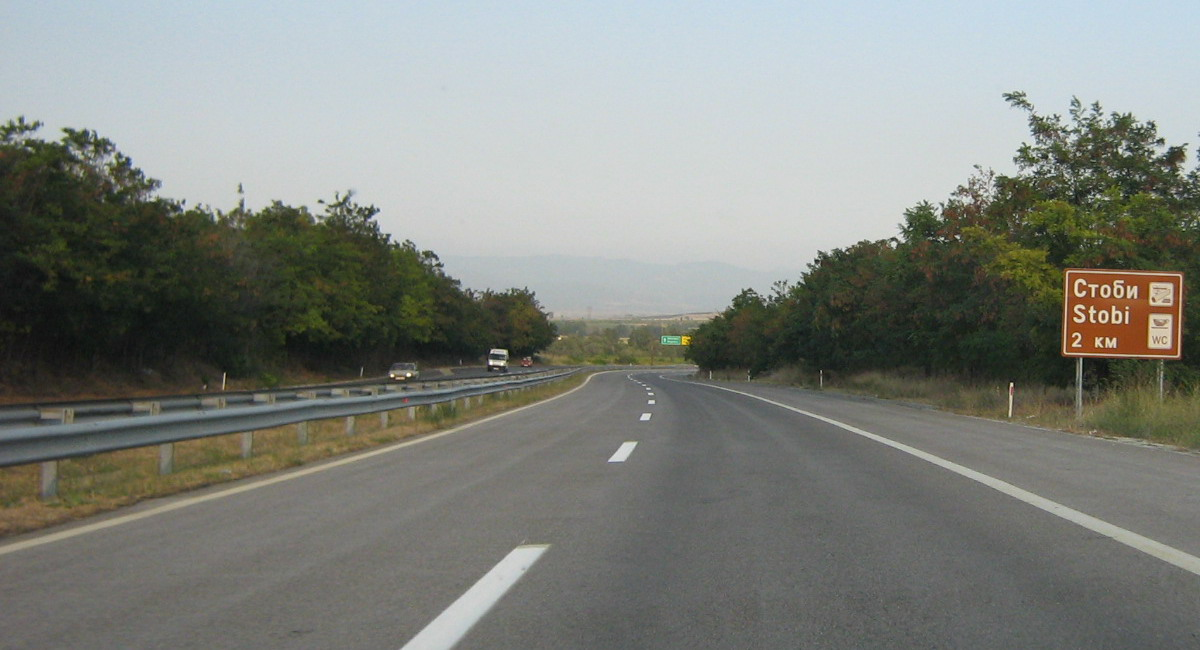
A1 near Stobi

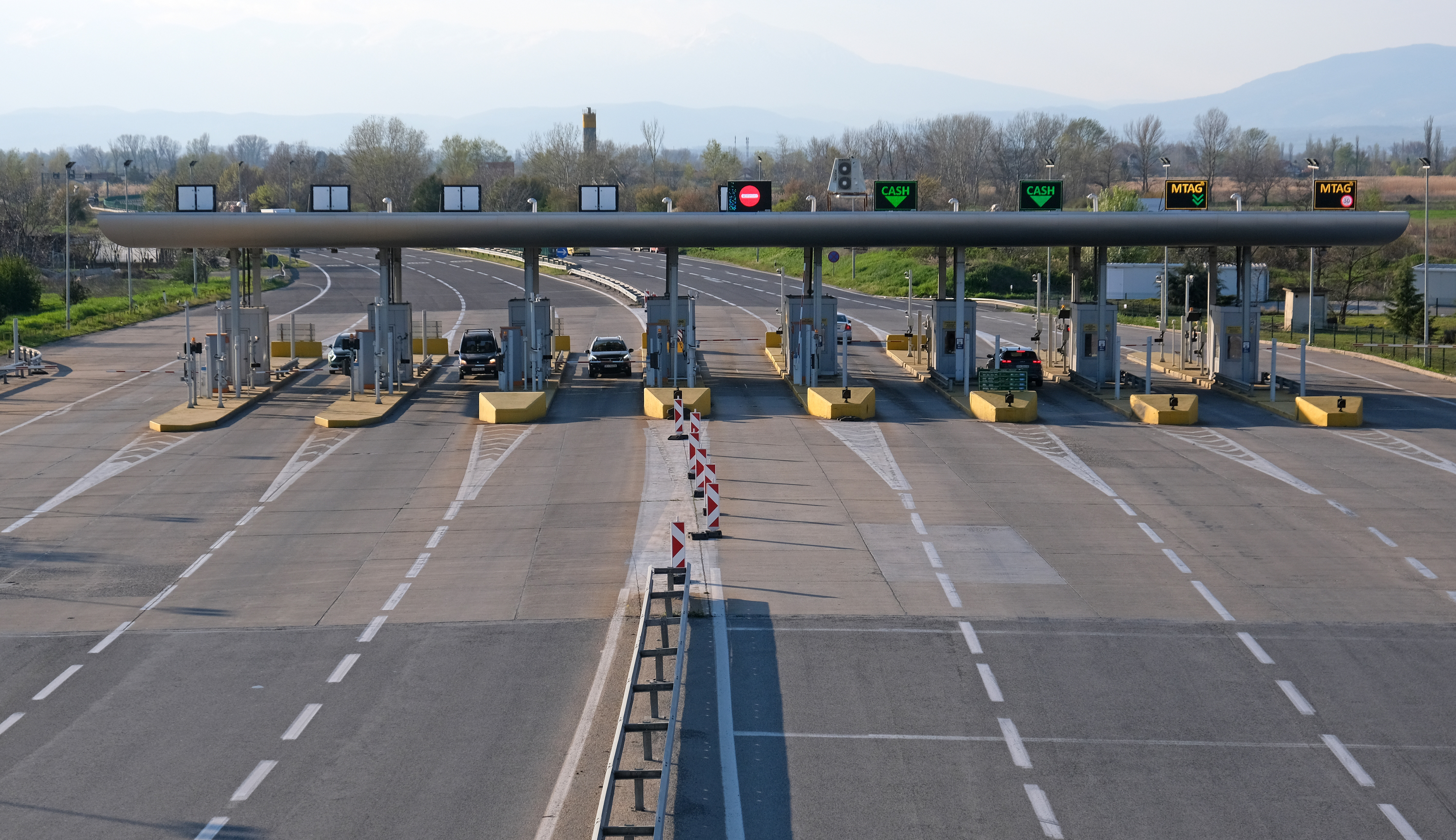
A4 road toll near Skopje airport

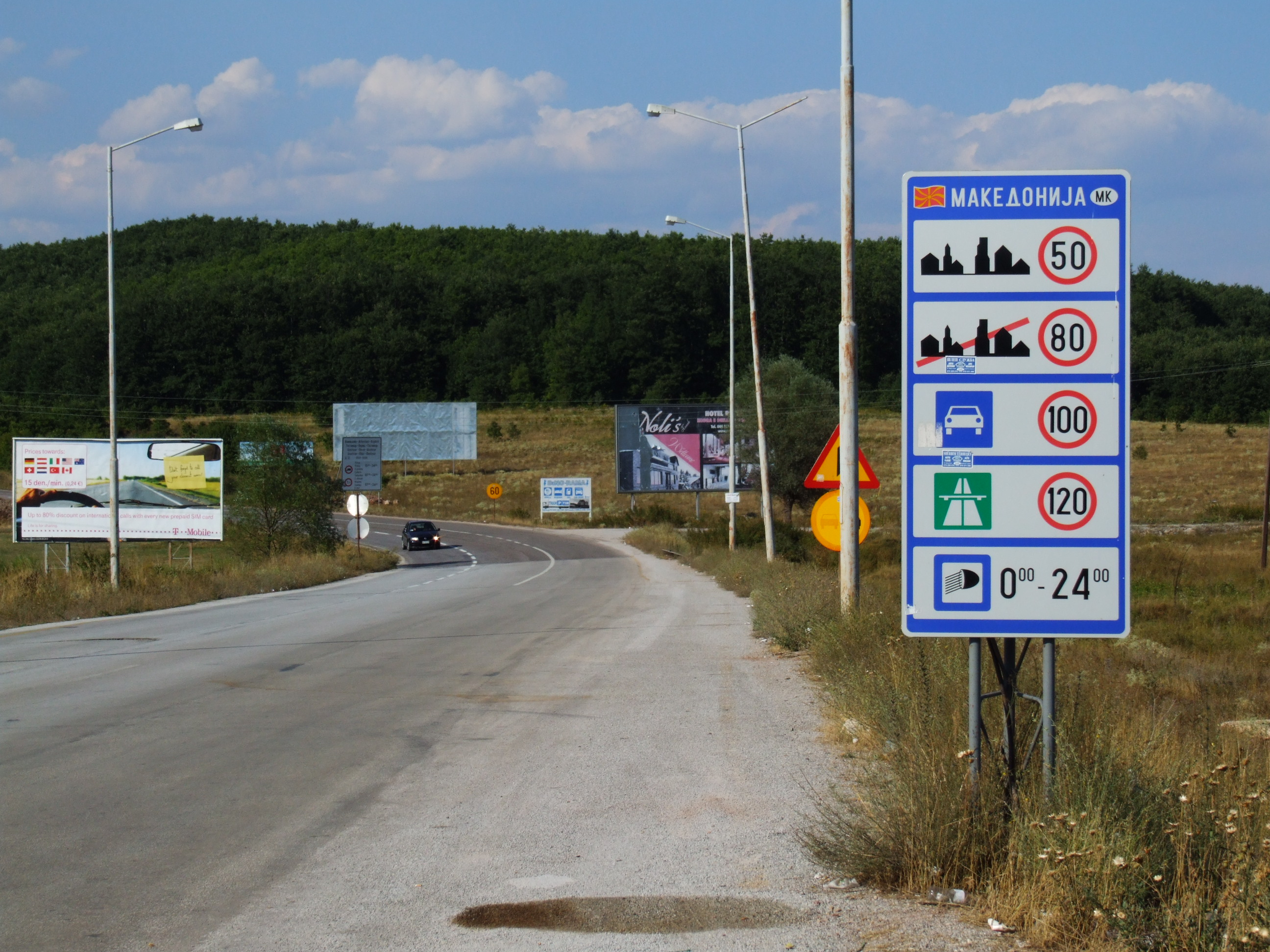
A2 near border crossing in Kjafasan

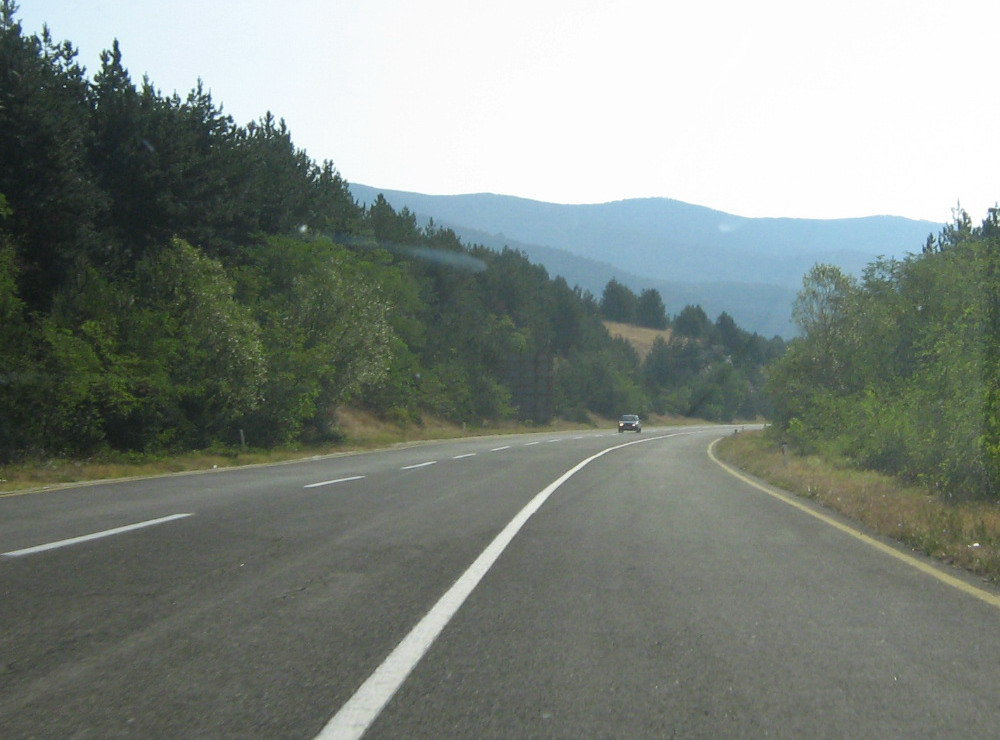
A3 near Resen

14,410 km (8,950 mi) total (2021)
335 km of motorways (2021)

=== Motorways ===
A-1
Tabanovce - Kumanovo - Miladinovci - Petrovec - Veles - Gradsko - Negotino - Demir Kapija - Gevgelija

A-2
Deve Bair - Kriva Palanka - Kumanovo - Skopje - Tetovo - Gostivar - Kičevo - Struga - Qafë Thanë

A-3
Ohrid - Resen - Bitola - Prilep - Veles - Štip - Kočani - Delčevo
(M-5K1 Bitola - Medžitlija)

A-4
Blace - Skopje - Petrovec - Miladinovci - Sveti Nikole - Štip - Radoviš - Strumica - Novo Selo

The first motorway in the country was the Kumanovo-Petrovec section of the A-1, opened for traffic in 1979 as part of the Brotherhood and Unity Highway which linked Central Europe to Athens.

In 2025 the country had 335 kilometers (208 mi) of motorways, with additional 167km under construction

=== E-roads ===
The E-road network in North Macedonia consists of:
E65
E75
E852
E871

=== Road rules ===
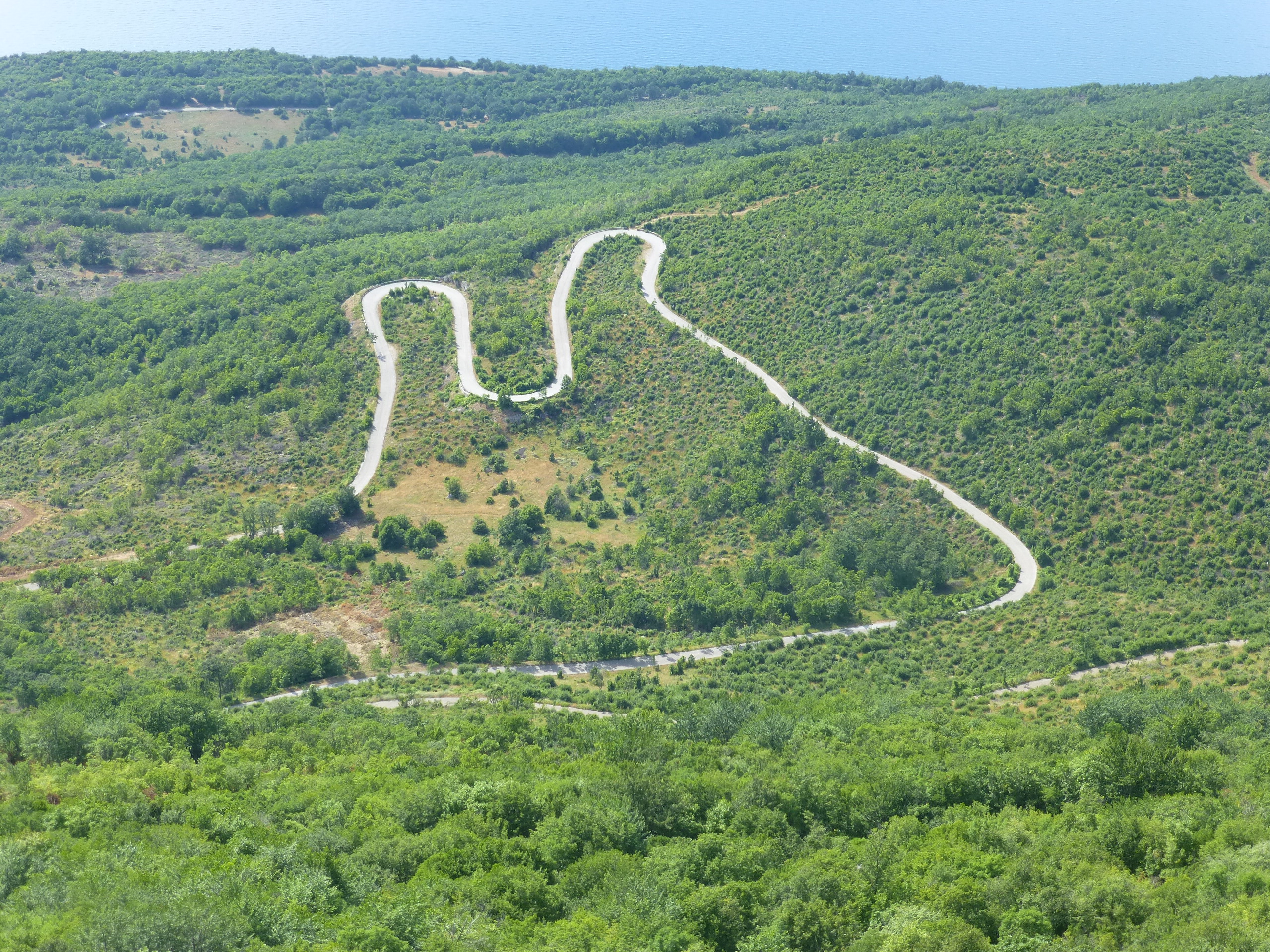
Regional Road P504, descending from the Galičica Mts to Lake Ohrid

The traffic signs adhere to the Vienna Convention on Road Signs and Signals.

Lights must be on all the time, seatbelts are mandatory for passengers in the front and drivers are forbidden to speak on a mobile phone while driving.

The general speed limits are:

- in inhabited areas 50 km/h (31 mph)
- outside of inhabited areas 90 km/h (56 mph)
- on expressways 110 km/h (68 mph)
- on motorways 130 km/h (81 mph)

== Waterways ==
None. Lake transport (tourist and recreational boats) only, on the Greek and Albanian borders.

== Pipelines ==
Oil 120 km (75 mi) (2004)
Gas 268 km (167 mi) (2004)

== Ports and harbours ==
North Macedonia has no sea access. There are marinas for mostly recreational traffic on Ohrid Lake and other natural and artificial lakes.

== Air transport ==
Air transport in North Macedonia began after the end of the First World War, when airmail traffic route was created between Novi Sad–Belgrade–Niš–Skoplje. Later, the Yugoslav flag carrier Aeroput inaugurated in 1930 a regular scheduled flight between Belgrade and Thessaloniki with a stop in Skopje airfield. Later, in 1933, Aeroput extended the route to Athens, while in 1935 Skopje was linked to Niš, Bitola, and Podujevo in 1936.

After the end of Second World War, passenger and cargo air transport reestablished, Aeroput was rebranded as JAT Yugoslav Airlines, and routes linking Belgrade, through Skopje, to Athens and Istanbul, using a Douglas DC-3, were inaugurated. During SFRY period JAT linked Skopje with Belgrade and other domestic destinations, but through Belgrade passengers from Skopje were able to catch connecting flights to all five continents. In the 1980s the Skopje airport was majorly expanded, and by late 1980s and early 1990s several companies with hub in Skopje were created, such as Palair, Avioimpex, Air Vardar, and others. After independence of North Macedonia, most became flag carriers of the newly independent country.

Beside Skopje, in North Macedonia, during second half of the 20th century, Ohrid airport was also developed, starting with the opening of regular scheduled flights between Belgrade–Skopje–Ohrid during the 1960s. Until 1990 charted flights were also inaugurated linking Ohrid with international destinations.

As of 2024, the country has no active air transport companies; the international airports of Skopje and Ohrid are served by foreign airlines.

=== Airports ===
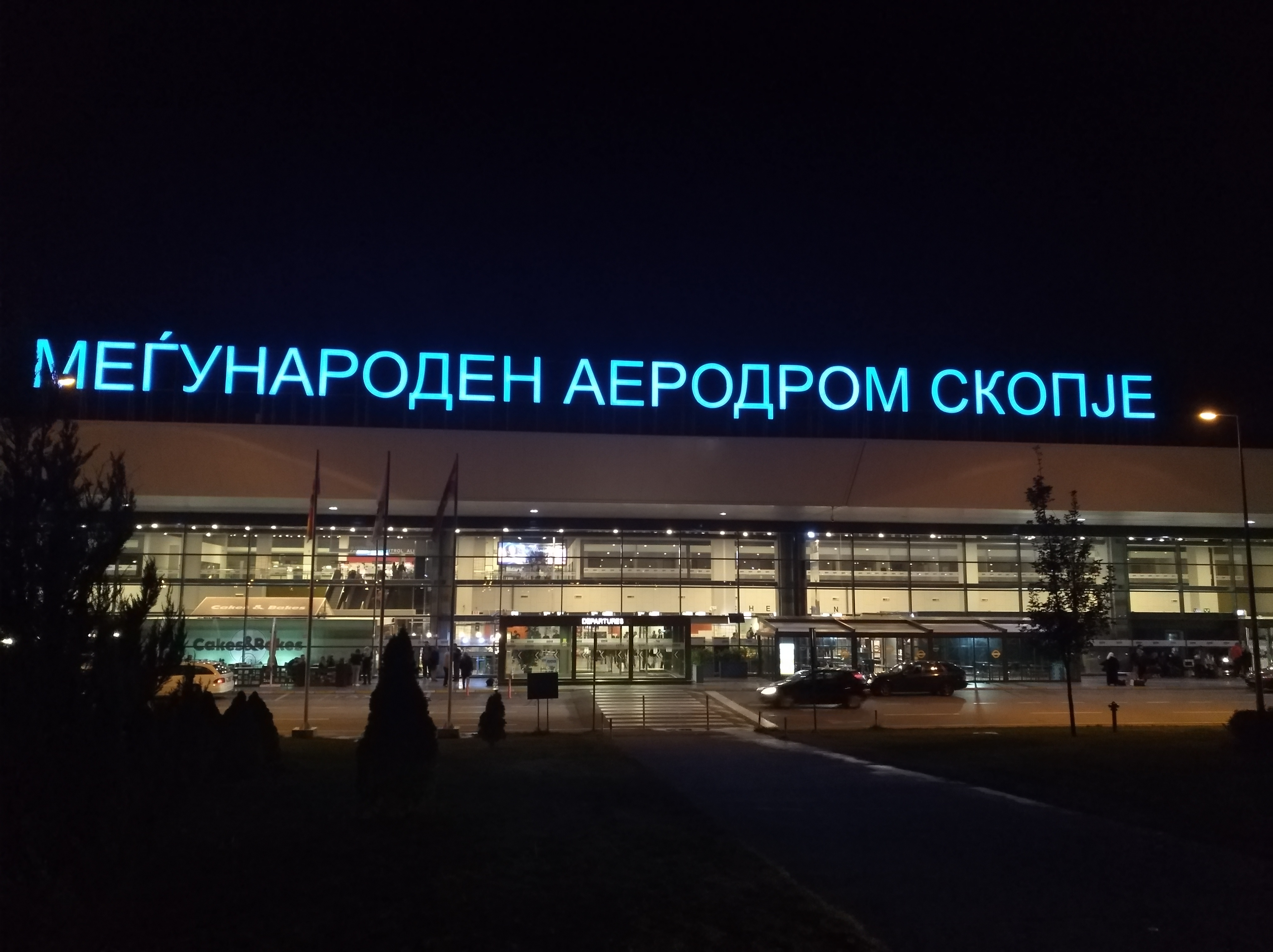
Skopje International Airport

17 (2002 est.)

==== Airports - with paved runways ====
total: 11
8,000 to 9,999 ft: 2
under 3,000 ft: 8 (2000 est.)

==== Airports - with unpaved runways ====
total: 6
3,000 to 4,999 ft: 3
under 3,000 ft: 3 (2000 est.)
