= 2010 Blace bunker raid =

2010 Macedonian police operation

Blace bunker raid
Date	29–30 April 2010
Location	Near the village of Blace on the Kosovo border
Result	Macedonian police victory: Armed group routed; Macedonian police seize bunkers and weapon caches

Belligerents
Macedonian police	Albanian armed group

Commanders and leaders
Gordana Jankuloska	

Units involved
Special police unit "Tigers"	

Casualties and losses
None	
- 3 suspects arrested by the Kosovo Police

The Macedonian police initiated an operation in late April 2010 to seize guarded weapon caches and bunkers near the village of Blace on the border with Kosovo. Members of the Macedonian special police unit "Tigers" conducted the raid.

== Background ==
In 2001, the region around Blace was engulfed in the armed conflict between ethnic Albanian insurgents and Macedonian security forces. The six-month conflict ended the same year with the Ohrid Framework Agreement that granted greater rights to ethnic Albanians in the country. According to Balkan Insight, the area around Blace was considered a hiding place for the armed insurgents. The ethnic Albanian insurgent group National Liberation Army (NLA) disbanded after the conflict and its leaders created the ethnic Albanian political party Democratic Union for Integration (DUI).

== Raid ==
The Macedonian special police unit "Tigers" performed a raid on 29 April 2010 near the village of Blace on the border with Kosovo. The Macedonian security forces briefly clashed with an armed group guarding bunkers and weapon caches on the Macedonia-Kosovo border. The group fled to Kosovo after a short fire exchange. Per A1 TV, one armed man was wounded by the police. The Macedonian police continued to search the area and discovered a large quantity of weapons including 20 missiles, three mortars, three field guns, TNT explosives, hand grenades and anti-tank mines, also uncovered were emblems of uniforms of the former NLA. According to the Macedonian interior minister Gordana Jankuloska, the group was planning large military operations to destabilize Macedonia and the wider Balkan region.

== Aftermath ==
An alleged NLA communiqué was sent to the Macedonian media, stating that it would continue operating in the country. DUI condemned the violence and said it had nothing to do with the weapon stash, nor with the alleged NLA communiqué. Kosovo Police arrested three people it suspected of being involved in the shootout with the police. NATO expressed concern and the large quantity of weapons found in the caches. Admiral Mark Fitzgerald, commander of NATO's Allied Joint Force Command in Naples on his visit to Kosovo considered the incident worrying and one that could potentially destabilize a country like Macedonia. Two weeks after the bunker raid, the Macedonian police engaged in a shootout with an armed group which was smuggling weapons near the Kosovo border. It is unclear if the two incidents were related. According to Alfa TV, the perpetrators of the 2015 Kumanovo clashes and attack at Gošince were men who were previously involved with the incidents with the weapon caches.

== See also ==
- Kondovo Crisis
- Operation Mountain Storm
- 2010 Raduša shootout
- 2001 insurgency in Macedonia
- Timeline of the 2001 insurgency in Macedonia
