= Kondovo Crisis =

The Kondovo Crisis (Macedonian: Кондовската криза, Albanian: Kriza e Kondovës) took place in the village of Kondovo, Republic of Macedonia, when an armed group of ethnic Albanians sealed off the village of Kondovo, Republic of Macedonia, a suburb of the capital Skopje.

== Background and crisis ==
Agim Krasniqi was a commander of the Albanian National Army during the 2001 insurgency in Macedonia. Krasniqi continued to be in charge of an armed group after the conflict. The village was occupied by his group, consisting of around 100 former insurgents, in July 2004. EU police advisors advised the Macedonian Ministry of Interior against trying to retake the village by force. The Macedonian police refused to storm the village despite public calls to do so, instead preferring to allow Albanian leaders to resolve the problem. On 17 December, ethnic Albanian politicians in Macedonia Ali Ahmeti and Arben Xhaferi reached a deal with the Albanian gunmen, ending the standoff. Both Agim Krasniqi and Lirim Jakupi agreed to leave the village in exchange of avoiding prosecution. Hard-liner Macedonians accused prime minister Vlado Bučkovski of betrayal of patriotism, threatening to bypass the government and revive neighborhood defense groups, consisting of Macedonian paramilitaries, because he gave the ethnic Albanian leaders time to convince the rebels to withdraw.

The village came under the control of the group again in February 2005. Four police officers were detained and beaten by the rebels in June. Macedonian security forces surrounded the village in the same month. Krasniqi demanded a full amnesty for his men. Western observers estimated fifty rebels in the village then, uniformed and armed with Kalashnikovs, mortars, and rocket launchers. The Macedonian government refused to do a large-scale police operation to retake control over the village, fearing it would raise ethnic tensions in the country and mobilize support for Krasniqi. The police issued warrants for his arrest after he ignored court summons for hearings over the charges of theft, kidnapping and illegal possession of weapons. However, Krasniqi warned that if the police approached the village, he would retaliate against Skopje with bombs and explosives. In July, President Branko Crvenkovski held a session of the National Security Council to discuss the situation. The council in 14 July gave the green light for the police to arrest Krasniqi. A month later, Krasniqi voluntarily showed up in front of a judge. The judge decided that the action guaranteed that he would be available for the courts during the judicial process. As a result, the arrest warrant was withdrawn and he was not detained. The court's decision was criticized by Crvenkovski and opposition political parties. Other analysts defended the court's decision.

== Aftermath ==
A former finance minister and political analyst and Democratic Union for Integration accused the Democratic Party of Albanians (DPA) of orchestrating the crisis. The allegations were denied by a DPA spokesperson.

In 2008, Agim Krasniqi was sentenced to 15 years in prison in Macedonia because of the event. He was also found guilty of a series of crimes, including election irregularities, possession of weapons, and criminal association. Krasniqi was allowed to spend the weekends out of prison. In September 2017, he was welcomed by the villagers in Kondovo. After almost 13 years spent behind bars, Krasniqi escaped in 2020 after a free weekend from the Štip prison where he was serving his sentence, two months before the parliamentary elections. After being on the run for four years, Krasniqi was arrested in Kosovo in April 2024. Krasniqi was extradited to North Macedonia in July and returned to the Štip prison.

== See also ==
- Timeline of the 2001 insurgency in Macedonia
- Operation Mountain Storm
- 2010 Blace bunker raid
- 2010 Raduša shootout
- 2015 Kumanovo clashes
