= Pan-European Corridor VIII =

European road network

- Pan-European Corridor VIII highlighted in red

Route information
- Length: 1,500 km (930 mi)

Major junctions
- Start end: Durrës (Albania)
- End end: Varna (Bulgaria)

Location
- Countries: Albania, North Macedonia and Bulgaria

Highway system
- Pan-European corridors

The Corridor VIII is one of the Pan-European corridors. It comprises both road and rail routes. Both commence on the Italian Adriatic coast at Bari or Brindisi, with a ferry crossing to Durrës in Albania. From there the routes cross the southern Balkans into Bulgaria and thence to Varna, on the Bulgarian Black Sea coast. The road corridor follows the route: Tirana/Durrës/Vlorë – Elbasan – Skopje – Pernik – Sofia – Plovdiv – Burgas – Varna. Although as yet incomplete, it is broadly paralleled by the rail route: Durrës/Vlorë-Lin-Radožda-Kičevo-Skopje-Kumanovo-Beljakovtse-Kriva Palanka-Gyueševo-Sofija-Burgas-Varna.

== Road route description ==
The road starts in Albania at either Durrës (SH4) or Vlorë (A2), both situated on the Adriatic coast. It intersects at Rrogozhinë (SH7, SH3) and runs towards Elbasan. It then crosses the border with North Macedonia at the Ohrid lake and then runs north to Tetovo mainly as a 2-lanes single-carriageway. The section between Ohrid and Kičevo will be upgraded to a motorway. A2 motorway runs between Tetovo and Skopje, and A1 motorway between Skopje and Kumanovo.

Between Kumanovo and Radomir, Bulgaria, it runs again as a 2-lanes single-carriageway. From Radomir to Pernik it is upgraded to a 4-lane dual-carriageway. Close to Pernik, the route joins Lyulin motorway (A6) for about 20 km to the Bulgarian capital, Sofia. After passing through the Sofia Ring Road, the route joins Trakia motorway (A1) for 360 km (220 mi) to Burgas, bypassing Pazardzhik, Plovdiv, Stara Zagora and Yambol on the way. At Burgas, the route turns to north, running along Black Sea coast mainly as a single-carriage road (I-9). The route joins Cherno More motorway (A5) for 10 km before reaching its final destination – Varna.

== Rail route description ==
The railway is only partly complete, at present there is a single-track line in Albania and a single-track line in parts of North Macedonia. The route is virtually complete in Bulgaria comprising both single and double track lines. The line already in existence in Albania from Durrës-Lin will be used, although upgrading and modifications will be needed. From Lin to Kičevo new construction will be required, almost all in North Macedonia. At the moment progress on this link is small, being mainly aspirational.

On North Macedonia's eastern side, the mothballed, 31 km long, Kumanovo-Beljakovce line has been restored and upgraded – work on this started in 2014. Construction of a new line, approximately 34 km long, from Beljakovce to Kriva Palanka began in 1996 but was abandoned due to lack of financial resources in 2004. Considerable earthworks and structures are, therefore, already in existence but currently do not reach Kriva Palanka. Entirely new construction will be needed in the area of Kriva Palanka to the Bulgarian border (24 km) plus a short length (~1 km) in Bulgaria. A total of approximately 88 km of the track must be restored or built in a region whose morphological features make access difficult. Once in Bulgaria, the existing line from Gyueshevo, extant since 1910, will be used.

From Gyueshevo the track runs broadly northwards to Sofia then uses the mainline through Burgas to Varna.

== See also ==
- Via Egnatia
