= Vera Jocić =

Yugoslav partisan and national hero

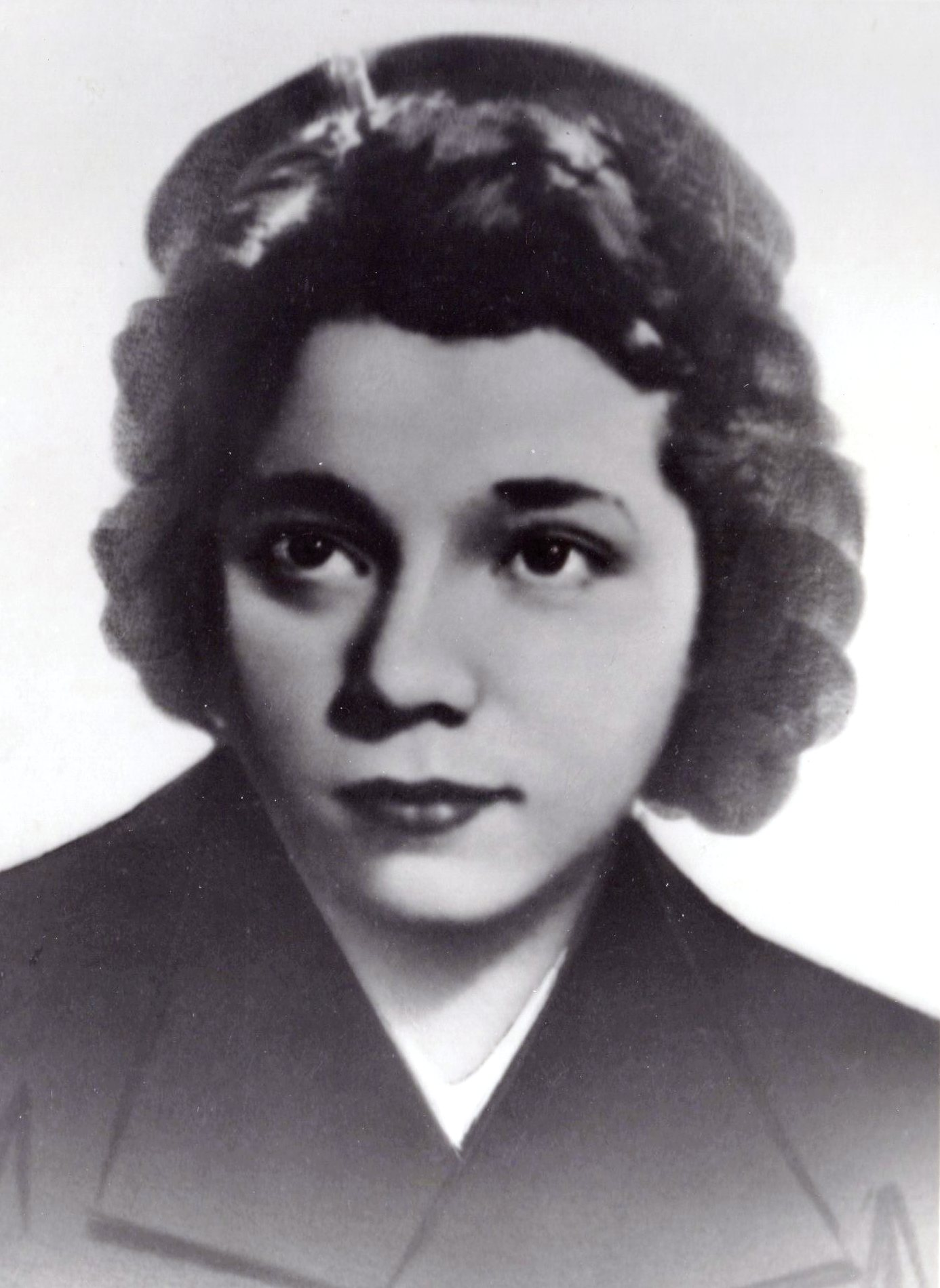
Vera Jocić.

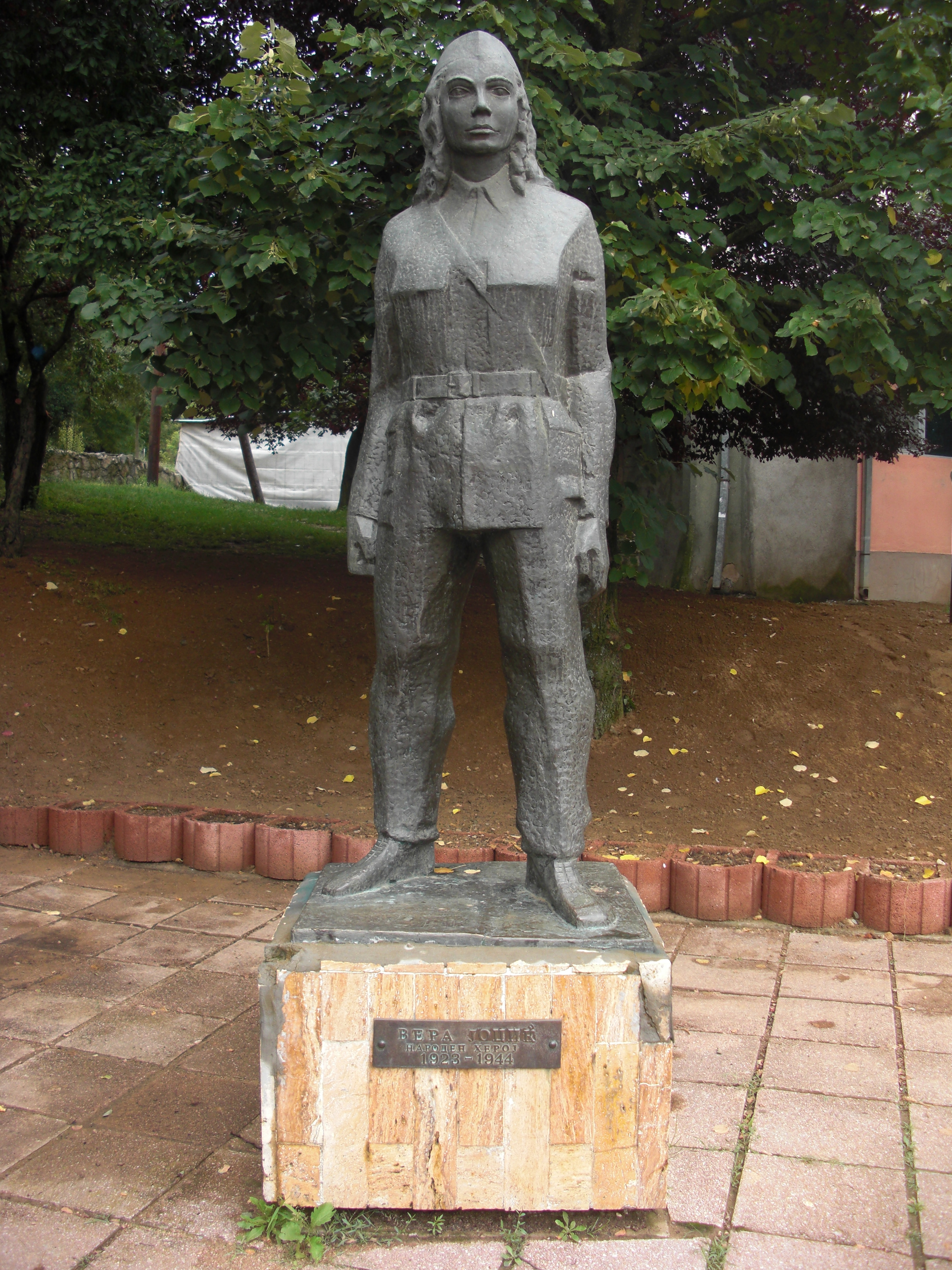
Statue of Vera Jocić in the town of Makedonska Kamenica

Vera Jocić (Serbian: Вера Јоцић; Macedonian: Вера Јоциќ; 21 August 1923 – 22 May 1944) was a Yugoslav partisan and People's Hero of Yugoslavia.

She was born in the village of Sindjelić, Kingdom of Serbs, Croats and Slovenes, in a Serbian colonists' family and fought in the Yugoslav People's Liberation War. She was wounded near Sasa in the Bulgarian occupation zone of Yugoslavia, (today North Macedonia), where she died. She inspired the famous song "Eyes" by Aco Šopov.
