= Operation Mountain Storm =

2007 Macedonian police operation

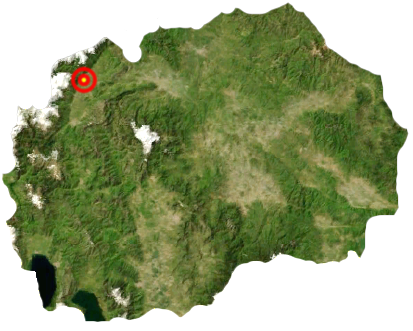
- Location of "Operation Mountain Storm"
Date	7 November 2007
Location	Tetovo region, Macedonia
Result	Macedonian police victory
Territorial changes	Macedonian forces regain control of the village of Brodec

Belligerents
Macedonian police	Albanian militant group

Commanders and leaders
Gordana Jankuloska	Lirim Jakupi (WIA); Ramadan Shiti †; Habit Ahmeti; Fisnik Meti †; Fatos Aliu; Bekim Mehmeti †

Units involved
Tigers; Rapid Deployment Unit	

Strength
Unknown number of policemen Unknown number of armoured vehicles	Unknown

Casualties and losses
None	8 militants killed 11 militants wounded 13 militants arrested

Operation Mountain Storm (Macedonian: Операција Планинска бура) was carried out on 7 November 2007 by special police forces of the Republic of Macedonia against an armed ethnic Albanian group in the Šar Mountains of Brodec above Tetovo region.

== Background ==
In 2007, armed Albanian opposition groups effectively controlled areas near the border with Kosovo. On 10 September an ethnic Albanian police commander and two police officers were wounded in Vaksince during an attempted arrest of Skender Halili and Xheladin Hiseni, two ethnic Albanians that were killed.

Lirim Jakupi's group escaped from the Dubrava prison in August with the help of "certain structures", in order to destabilize the region "should the Kosovo negotiations go in a direction these structures do not favor.", according to security services. On 1 November one of the escapees, Xhavit Morina, former commander of Albanian National Army (ANA), was killed by unknown perpetrators near Tetovo. Jakupi, the leader and former member of ANA, was wanted in Macedonia for launching a rocket at a police station, killing a taxi driver, and wounding three police officers, as well as for putting the village of Volkovo under siege and threatening to bomb Skopje. Jakupi, born in Bujanovac, is wanted in Serbia for several criminal acts.

== Operation ==
The group was headed by Ramadan Shiti and Lirim Jakupi (known as "The Nazi"), Wahhabi extremists and paramilitary men who escaped from the Dubrava prison in Kosovo in August. The group was originally under ANA until Jakupi's imprisonment for attempted murder. Some in the group, such as Shiti, had previously been linked with a Saudi-backed Wahhabi Muslim sect's attempts to take control over the Islamic communities in Macedonia and Kosovo. The operation was carried out by a multi-ethnic special police force in the villages of Brodec, Vešala and Vejce, near Tetovo, beginning in the morning. The criminal group was defeated, and all police officers that participated in the operation were unharmed. Two houses in the village of Brodec were destroyed by fire as a result of the clash, while the village mosque, which was used as a combat post by some members of the group, was damaged.

6 militants were killed, 11 were wounded, and 13 arrested, among them, Ramadan Shiti, Habit Ahmeti and Fisnik Meti also known as "Commander Çeliku". The detained men were beaten, according to witnesses. Heavy weapons and ammunition were confiscated, including 3 mortars, 111 artillery shells, 2 recoillless rifles, 40 grenades, an electronically guided vehicle missile system, 9K111 Fagot, 4 surface-to-air missile launchers, 4 anti-aircraft missile systems, 9 Strela 2, M80 "Zolja", two grenade launchers, an M79 Rocket Launcher, 7 missiles, 6 RPGs and 132 grenades, 1 40 mm grenade launcher MGL-6, 56 grenades, 31 trinitrotoluene explosives, and plastic explosives. Meanwhile, KFOR had increased its troop level in Kosovo, since the start of the operation.

== Aftermath ==
On 8 November, a group calling itself the "Political-Military Council of the KLA" claimed responsibility for the armed clash with the Macedonian police. ANA leader Gafur Adili denied any connection with Jakupi's group. A Macedonian helicopter was allegedly shot down during the clashes; KFOR claims that a helicopter was shot down in the area, while Macedonian authorities denied the reports. On 9 November, the police raided ethnic Albanian homes in Skopje, making additional arrests.

Amnesty International expressed concerns over possible excessive use of force by the Macedonian authorities in the operation. The Democratic Union for Integration, an ethnic Albanian party, also alleged disproportionate use of force. An internal investigation by the Macedonian Ministry of Interior concluded that the use of firearms by the police was "appropriate, proportionate, justified and necessary", and that the detainees had been injured while resisting arrest.

A Skopje court in July 2008 found the militants guilty and gave them prison terms between 10 and 15 years for terrorist association and possession of illegal weaponry. Lirim Jakupi escaped the scene with a wound. Jakupi was sentenced in absentia by the court for 15 years for organising a terrorist group and illegal possession of weapons. He was later arrested in September 2010, in an apartment in Pristina, Kosovo, together with grenades and weapons, by the Kosovo police. The authorities released him in 2017.

== See also ==
- Kondovo Crisis
- 2010 Blace bunker raid
- 2010 Raduša shootout
- 2012 Republic of Macedonia inter-ethnic violence
- Timeline of the 2001 insurgency in Macedonia
