= 2010 Raduša shootout =

2010 shootout

Raduša shootout
Date	11 May 2010
Location	Raduša, Skopje, Macedonia, near border with Kosovo
Result	Macedonian police victory: Armed group neutralized; Weapons and uniforms seized

Belligerents
Macedonian police	Albanian armed group

Commanders and leaders
Gordana Jankuloska	Harun Aliu †

Units involved
Unknown special unit	Unknown

Strength
Unknown	4 men

Casualties and losses
None	4 killed

The Macedonian police forces had a shootout with an armed group near the village of Raduša, Macedonia (now North Macedonia), close to the Kosovo border, which was smuggling weapons. The Macedonian police recovered a large quantity of weapons and NLA uniforms in their vehicle.

== Background ==
The village of Raduša during the 2001 insurgency in Macedonia was the site of the Battle of Raduša between the Macedonian security forces and the National Liberation Army (NLA). The NLA was disarmed and disbanded after the conflict. The town is located on a road that guards the water supply for the city of Skopje and the Kosovo border.

Weeks before the Macedonian police forces found several bunkers on the Kosovo border filled with weapons and ammunition including heavy weapons such as machine guns, RPGs, anti-tank mines, explosives and detonators, one bunker was found in the village of Blace, where Macedonian police was also fired upon by several men. It is unclear if there is a connection between the two events.

== Police action ==
The shootout occurred at 2 am on 11 May when members of a Macedonian special police unit were fired upon by the group after they refused to stop at the request of the police. The armed men were operating a white van, smuggling weapons and explosives to Kosovo. None of the police officers were killed or wounded. The Macedonian security forces found large quantities of weapons and explosives at the sight both old and new models, including TNT explosives, anti-tank mines, mortar rounds, grenades and uniforms and emblems of the NLA.

== Aftermath ==
Three of the men were identified as local Albanians, including Harun Aliu, while one was a citizen from Kosovo and all of them were said by the police to have been previously involved in illegal activities. Aliu was the leader of the group, a commander of the NLA during the conflict and was sentenced in absentia to life in prison for killing a police officer in 2008 in Skopje. Albanian politicians from Macedonia refused to comment on the incident. US Ambassador to Macedonia Philip Reeker expressed his support for the police action and defined the armed group as armed criminals who planned acts of violence against the citizens of Macedonia.

== See also ==
- Timeline of the 2001 insurgency in Macedonia
- Operation Mountain Storm
