= Agim Krasniqi =

Albanian insurgent leader

- Born: 1951 (age 74–75); Kondovo, SR Macedonia
- Military career
- Allegiance: National Liberation Army; Albanian National Army
- Rank: Commander
- Conflicts: Yugoslav Wars; 2001 insurgency in Macedonia

Agim Krasniqi (Macedonian: Агим Красниќи, romanized: Agim Krasnikji) is an ethnic Albanian and former insurgent leader based in the village of Kondovo near Skopje, the capital of North Macedonia.

== Life ==
Krasniqi was born in Kondovo near Skopje in 1951. In 1984, while he was part of the Fronti Nacional Çlirimtar, he was arrested along with other members. He was one of the commanders of the Albanian National Army, which participated in the 2001 insurgency in Macedonia. He remained active as the leader of an armed group after the signing of the 2001 Ohrid Agreement.

Krasniqi and his group of around 100 militants controlled the village of Kondovo twice, first in July and December 2004 and later between February and August 2005, that accompanied the governmental vote of the time. Through the media, Krasniqi threatened to shell Skopje and his men kidnapped and beat four police officers. After this, the ANA withdrew into Kosovo. In July 2005, President Branko Crvenkovski held a session of the National Security Council to discuss the situation. On 14 July, the council gave the green light for the police to arrest Krasniqi. A month later, Krasniqi voluntarily showed up in front of a judge. The judge decided that the action guaranteed he would be available for the courts during the judicial process. As a result, the arrest warrant was withdrawn and he was not detained.

Krasniqi's group was accused by the Macedonian government and media of being involved in the attack on the police station in the village of Vratnica on 12 July 2005. Three shells were fired from a missile launcher at the station, mortars, and automatic firearms. These attacks resulted in the area being declared off-limits by the Macedonian police.

Starting in September 2004, arrest warrants were issued against him for illegal possession of weapons, kidnapping and theft. He was later arrested and sent to court. In February 2007 Agim Krasniqi and his group pleaded not guilty on charges of acts of terror. In 2008, Krasniqi was sentenced to 15 years in prison in Macedonia due to a series of crimes, including election irregularities, possession of weapons, and criminal association. Krasniqi was allowed to spend the weekends out of prison. In September 2017, he was welcomed by the villagers in Kondovo. After almost 13 years spent behind bars, Krasniqi escaped in 2020 after a free weekend from the Štip prison where he was serving his sentence, two months before the parliamentary elections. After being a fugitive for four years, Krasniqi was arrested in Kosovo in April 2024. Krasniqi was extradited to North Macedonia in July and returned to the Štip prison.
