= Nikuštak =

Nikuštak Никуштак Nikushtak
- Village
- Nikustak / Nakushtak / Nikushtak
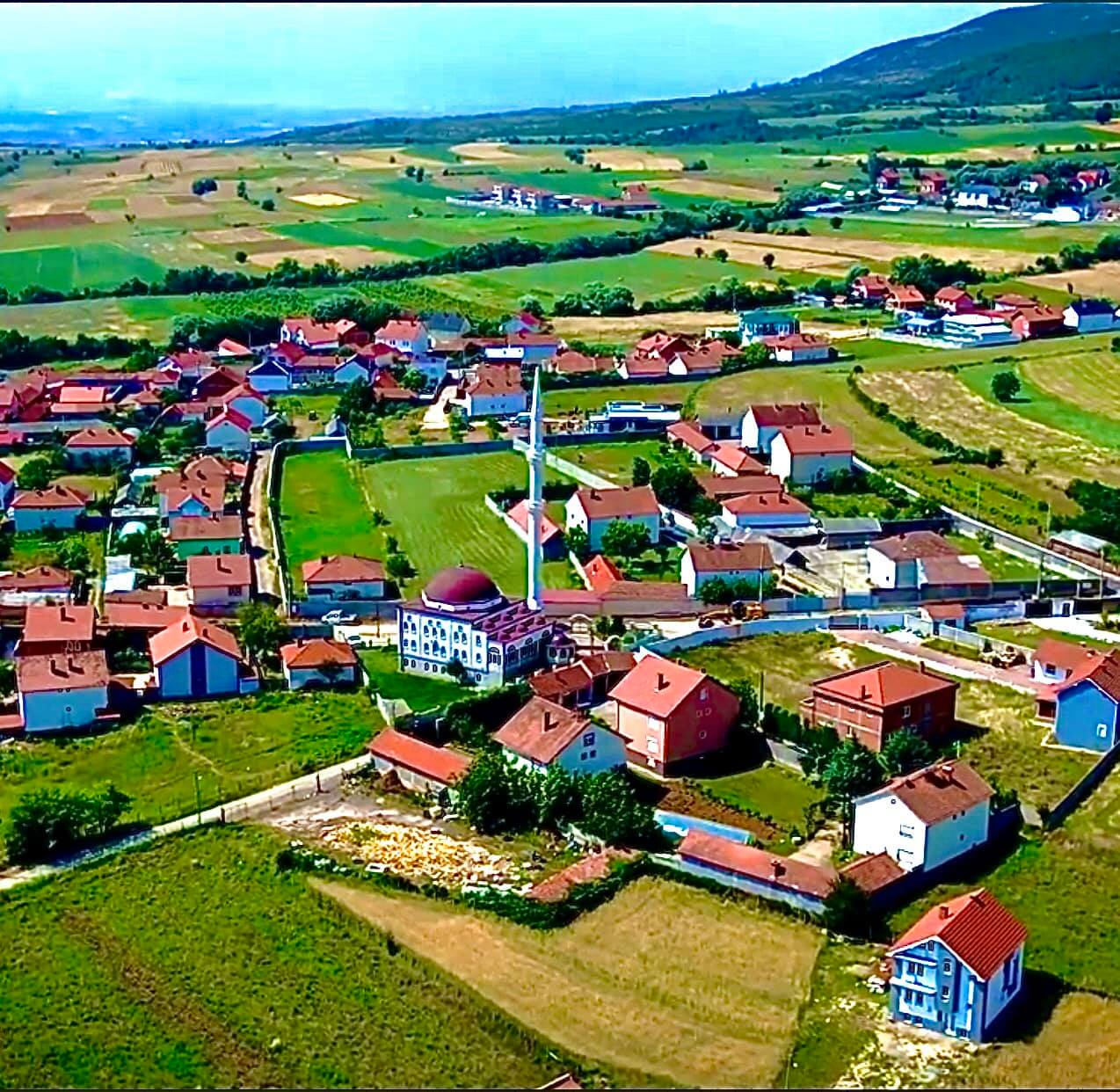
- View of the village

- Location within North Macedonia
- Coordinates: 42°05′N 21°35′E
- Country: North Macedonia
- Region: Southeastern
- Municipality: Lipkovo

Population (2021)
  - Total: 1,572
- Time zone: UTC+1 (CET)
  - Summer (DST): UTC+2 (CEST)
- Car plates: KU
- Website: .

Nikuštak (Macedonian: Никуштак, Albanian: Nikushtak) is a village in the municipality of Lipkovo, North Macedonia.

== Demographics ==
As of the 2021 census, Nikuštak had 1,572 residents with the following ethnic composition:

- Albanians 1,536
- Persons for whom data are taken from administrative sources 36

According to the 2002 census, the village had a total of 1,748 inhabitants. Ethnic groups in the village include:

- Albanians 2000
- Macedonians 0
- Others 0
