= Čento =

Čento Ченто Hasanbeg Hasanbegovo
- Neighbourhood
- Location in Gazi Baba Municipality

- Location within Republic of North Macedonia
- Coordinates: 42°00′23″N 21°30′13″E
- Country: North Macedonia
- Region: Skopje
- Municipality: Gazi Baba

Population (2002)
  - Total: 23,915
- Time zone: UTC+1 (CET)
  - Summer (DST): UTC+2 (CEST)
- Car plates: SK
- Website: .

Čento (Macedonian: Ченто; Albanian: Hasanbeg; Bosnian: Hasanbegovo) is a neighbourhood in the City of Skopje, North Macedonia, administered by the Gazi Baba Municipality. The neighbourhood is named after Macedonian politician Metodija Andonov-Čento.

== Demographics ==
According to the 2002 census, the town had a total of 23,915 inhabitants. Ethnic groups in the town include:

- Macedonians 12.499
- Albanians 8.818
- Romani 891
- Serbs 657
- Bosniaks 407
- Turks 316
- Vlachs 83
- Others 244

== Sports ==
The local football club KF Fortuna 1975 plays in the Macedonian Third Football League.

== Notable residents ==
- Vera Jocić
