= Kondovo, Saraj =

Kondovo Кондово Kondovë
- Village
- Location within North Macedonia
- Coordinates: 42°01′N 21°19′E
- Country: North Macedonia
- Region: Skopje
- Municipality: Saraj

Population (2021)
  - Total: 3.626
- Time zone: UTC+1 (CET)
  - Summer (DST): UTC+2 (CEST)
- Car plates: SK
- Website: .

Kondovo (Macedonian: Кондово, Albanian: Kondovë) is a village in the municipality of Saraj, North Macedonia. Its FIPS code was MK90.

Between 2004–05 the Kondovo crisis took place here.

== Demographics ==
According to the 1467-68 Ottoman defter, Kondovo exhibits a mixed Slavic-Albanian anthroponymy.

According to the 2021 census, the village had a total of 3.626 inhabitants. Ethnic groups in the village include:

- Albanians 3.353
- Turks 9
- Macedonians 18
- Serbs 2
- Bosniaks 66
- Others 178

| Year | Macedonian | Albanian | Turks | Romani | Vlachs | Serbs | Bosniaks | Others | Total |
|---|---|---|---|---|---|---|---|---|---|
| 2002 | 15 | 3.222 | 23 | 156 | ... | 1 | 81 | 42 | 3.384 |
| 2021 | 18 | 3.353 | 9 | ... | ... | 2 | 66 | 178 | 3.626 |

== See also ==
- Kondovo Crisis
