= Brodec, Tetovo =

Brodec
- Village
- Бродец
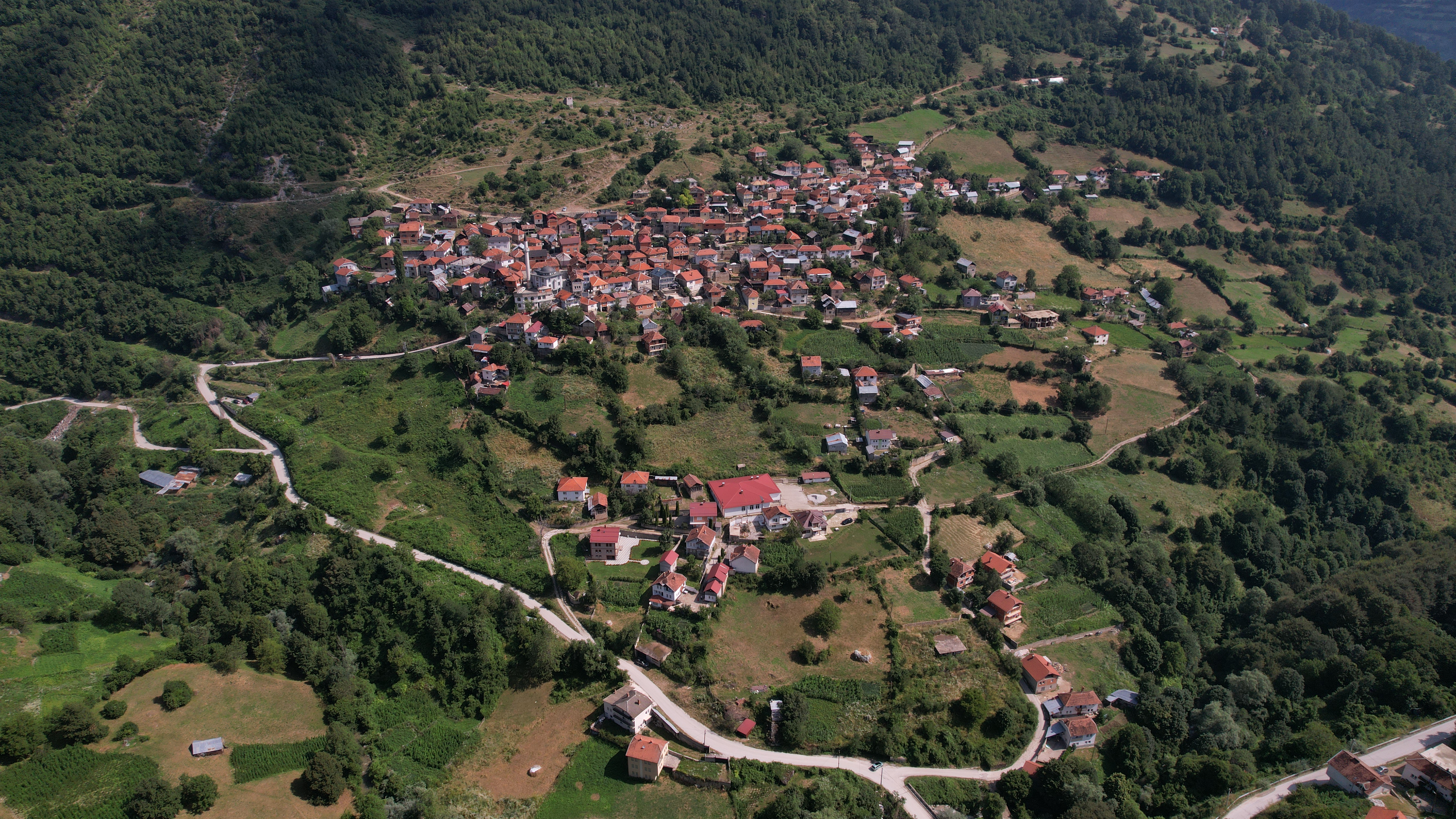
- Air view of the village

- Location within North Macedonia
- Coordinates: 42°03′29″N 20°53′31″E
- Country: North Macedonia
- Region: Polog
- Municipality: Tetovo

Population (2021)
  - Total: 734
- Time zone: UTC+1 (CET)
  - Summer (DST): UTC+2 (CEST)
- Car plates: TE
- Website: .

Brodec (Macedonian: Бродец, Albanian: Brodec) is a village in the municipality of Tetovo, North Macedonia.

== Demographics ==
According to the Bulgarian ethnographer Vasil Kanchov in 1900, the village of Brodec was inhabited by 165 Muslim Albanians.

According to the Bulgarian ethnographer Dimitar Gadžanov, in 1916 Brodec was inhabited by 380 Muslim Bulgarians.

According to the 1942 Albanian census, Brodec was inhabited by 548 Muslim Albanians.

According to the 2021 census, the village had a total of 734 inhabitants. Ethnic groups in the village include:

- Albanians 651
- Others 83

Year	Macedonian	Albanian	Turks	Romani	Vlachs	Serbs	Bosniaks	Others	Total
2002	...	1.136	...	...	...	...	...	...	1.136
2021	...	651	...	...	...	...	...	83	734
