= A2 motorway (North Macedonia) =

Road in North Macedonia

A2

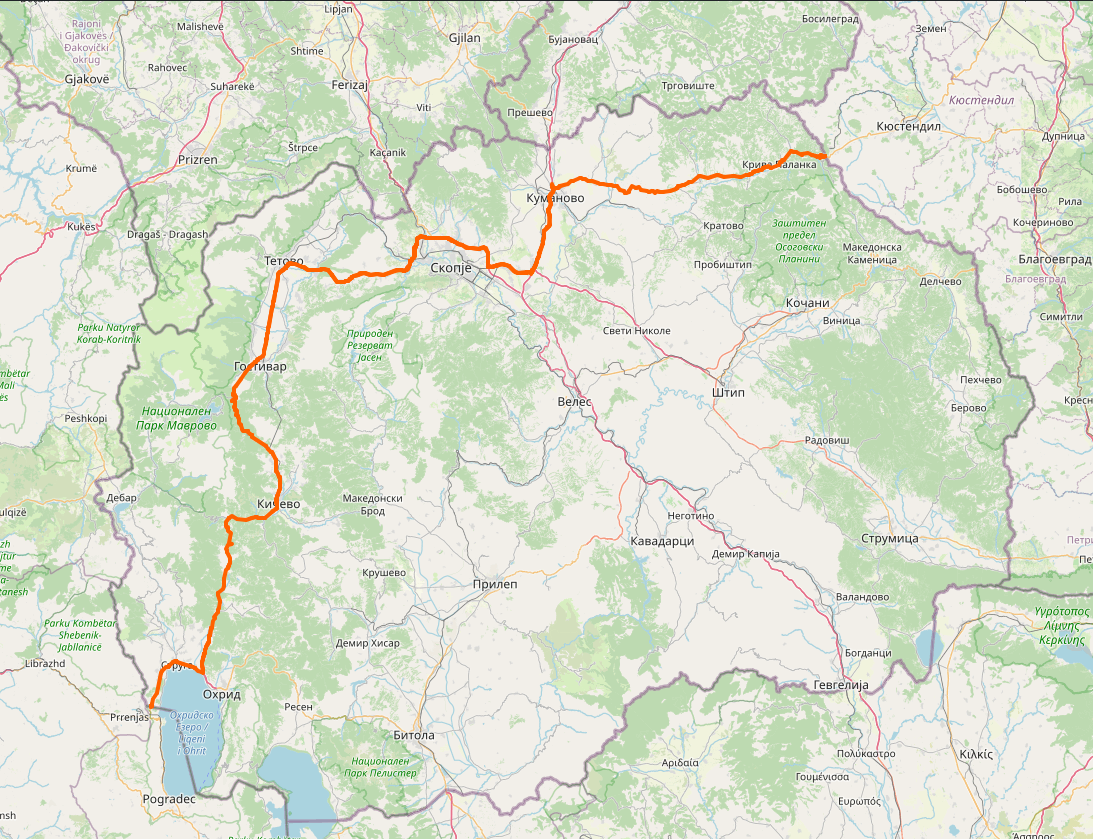

Route information
- Part of E65 E871
- Length: 73 km (45 mi)

Major junctions
- East end: Deve Bair checkpoint, entering I-6 road in Bulgaria.
- West end: Kjafasan checkpoint

Location
- Country: North Macedonia
- Major cities: Skopje, Tetovo

Highway system
- Transport in North Macedonia

The A2 motorway (Macedonian: автопат A2) is a national motorway in North Macedonia. It forms part of the European route E65 (E65), connecting the cities of Skopje and Tetovo.

== Route ==
The motorway begins at the Kjafasan checkpoint at the Albanian border near Lake Ohrid. The route passes through the airport interchange in Skopje with the A1 motorway and connects it to the city of Tetovo, forming part of a beltway around Skopje. The Skopje beltway is also part of the A2 motorway, which follows another route thereafter. Leaving Skopje, it continues to Tetovo. Gostivar is about 19 km south and it can be easily reached, using the expressway part of the road. This part is just like the rest of the A2, but it does not feature an emergency lane and it does not meet some other motorway requirements. The route continues East towards the Deve Bair checkpoint at the border with Bulgaria, connecting with I-6 road there.

== Pictures ==
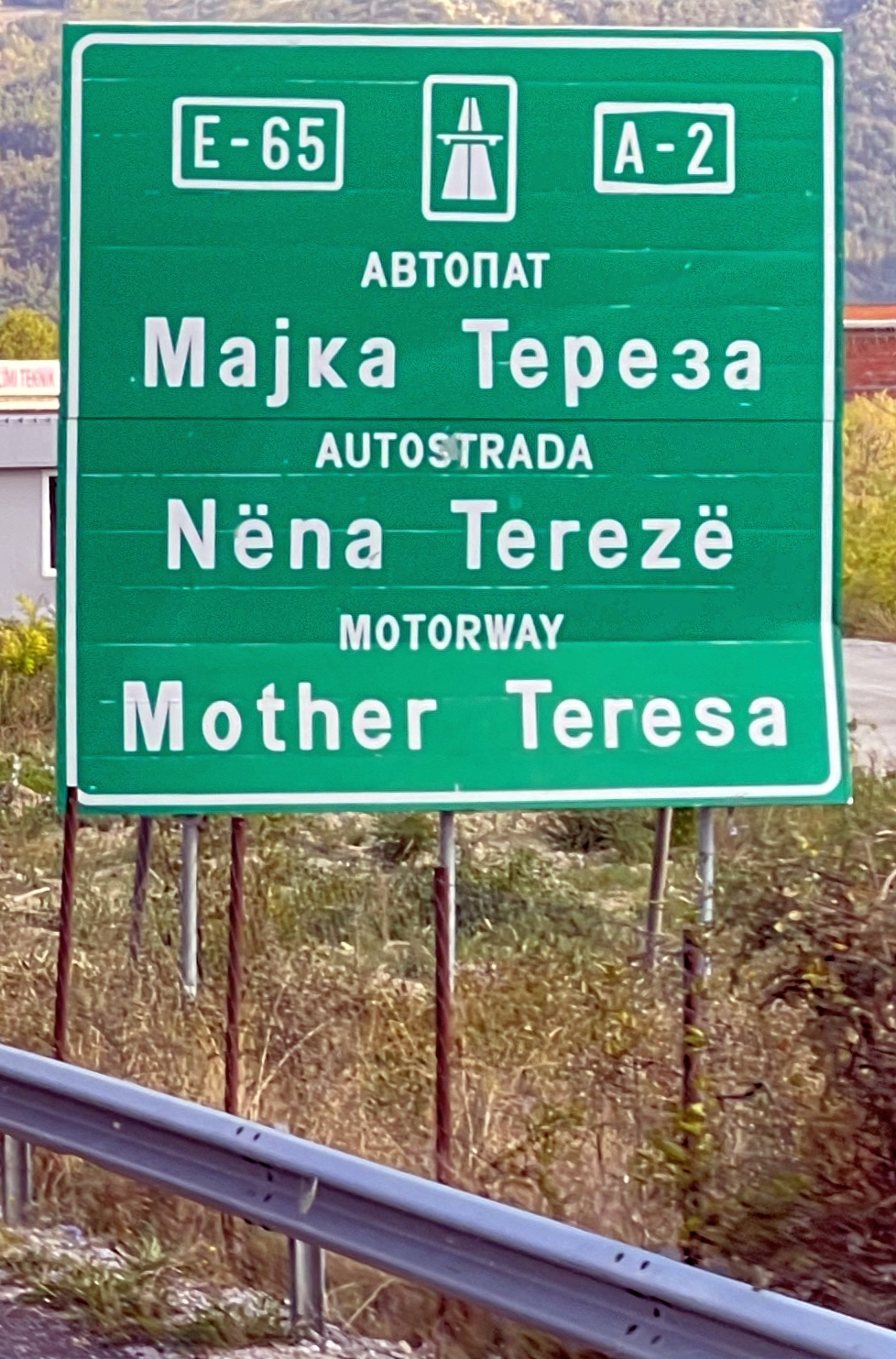
Road sign near Skopje

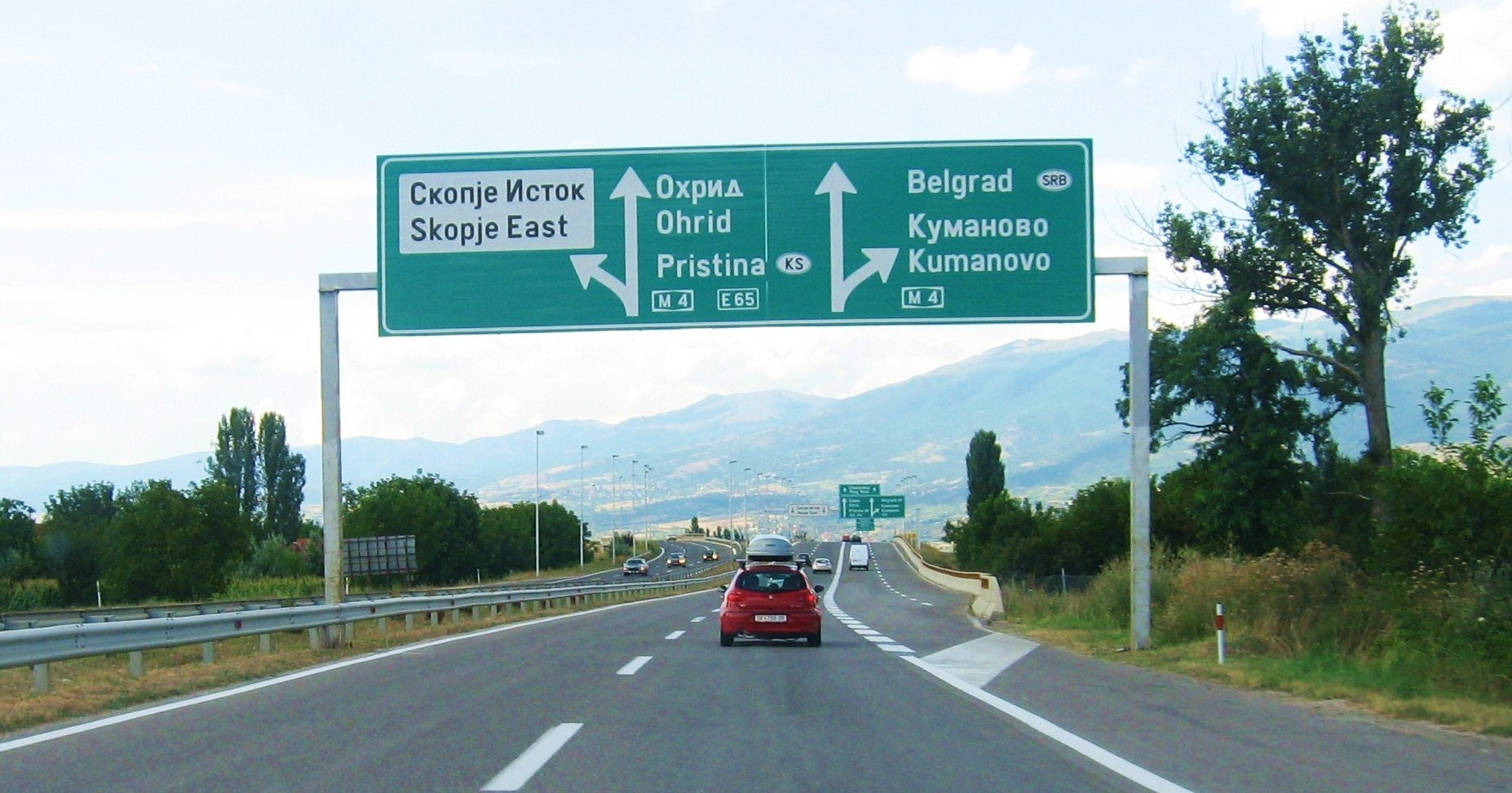
The A2 outside Skopje

== Future plans ==
The existing Kičevo–Ohrid single carriageway road is being upgraded to a four-lane motorway. The Klimeshtani–Ohrid section, about 17 kilometres long, was opened to traffic in September 2025. The Vrbjani–Botun section opened earlier in 2025, and the full 57 km (35 mi) route is due for completion in 2027.

In 2023, a Bechtel–Enka joint venture won a contract to build about 110 kilometres of motorway in North Macedonia, including the Tetovo–Gostivar, Gostivar–Bukojchani and Trebenishte–Struga–Kjafasan sections of Corridor VIII.

For the final motorway section, Bukojchani–Kichevo, a contractor is expected to be selected in 2026, with construction expected to begin in the same year.
