= European route E871 =

Road in trans-European E-road network

E871

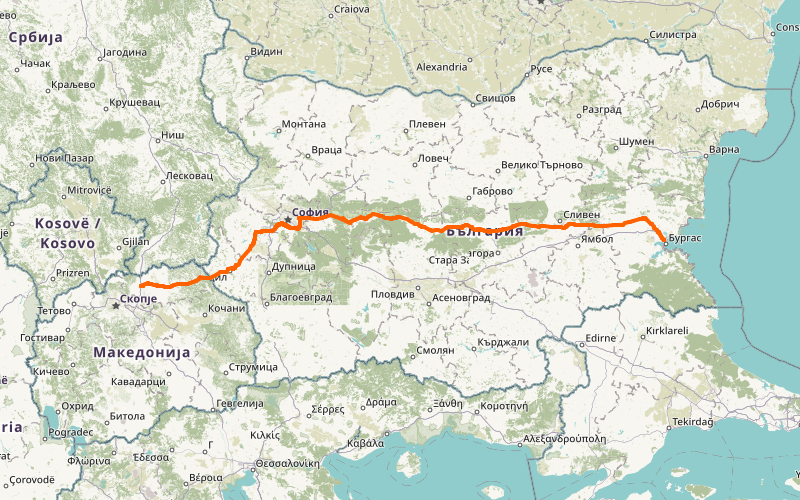

Major junctions
- From: Sofia (Bulgaria)
- Pernik, Kyustendil
- To: Kumanovo (North Macedonia)

Location
- Countries: Bulgaria, North Macedonia

Highway system
- International E-road network; A Class; B Class

E 871 is a European B class road in Bulgaria and North Macedonia, connecting Sofia in Bulgaria and the city of Kumanovo in North Macedonia.

== Route ==
- Bulgaria
  - I-6: Kazanluk - Karlovo - Pirdop - Zlatitsa - Gorni Bogrov
  - I-1: Gorni Bogrov - Sofia
  - I-18: Sofia
  - I-1: Sofia - Pernik - Radomir - Kyustendil
  - I-6: Kyustendil - Garlyano - (Bulgaria) / (North Macedonia) border crossing
- North Macedonia
  - A-2: Uzem - Kriva Palanka - Ginovtsi - Rankovtse - Mlado Nagorichane - Kumanovo

== See also ==
Roads in Bulgaria
Highways in Bulgaria
