= A1 motorway (North Macedonia) =

Motorway in North Macedonia

A1

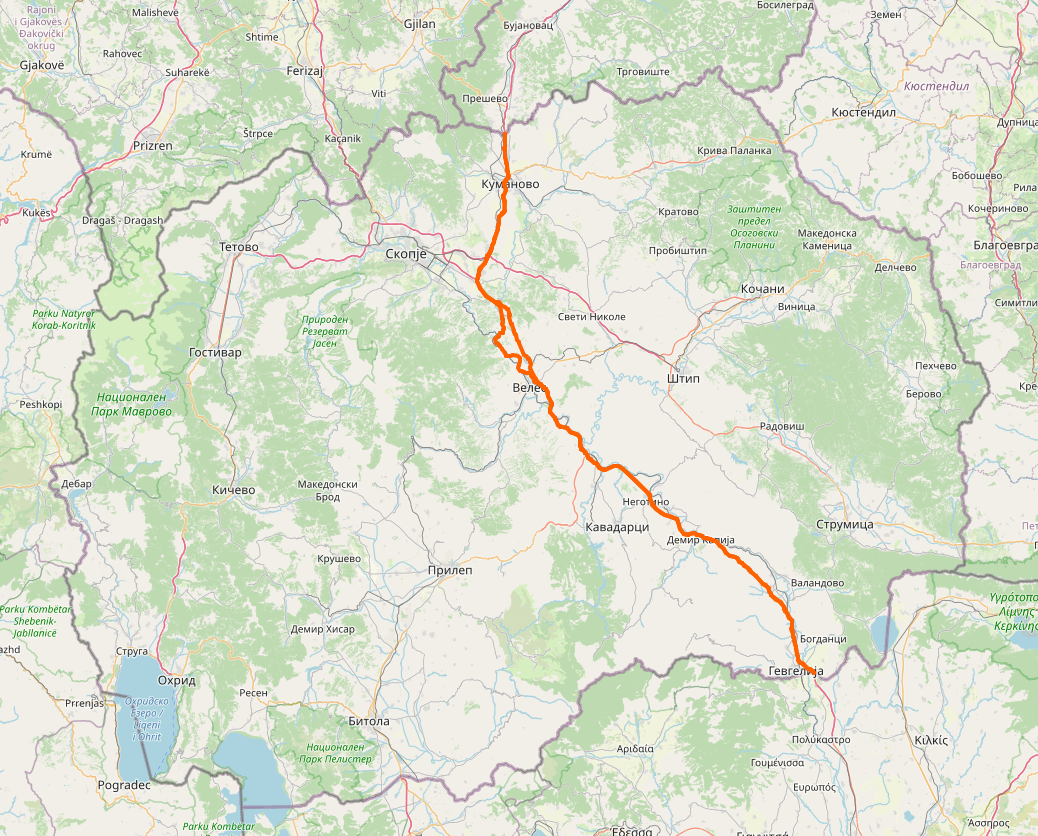

Route information
- Part of E75
- Length: 173 km (107 mi)

Major junctions
- North end: Kumanovo, Serbian border
- South end: Gevgelija, Greek border

Location
- Country: North Macedonia
- Major cities: Kumanovo, Skopje, Veles, Gevgelija

Highway system
- Transport in North Macedonia

The A1 motorway (Macedonian: автопат A1) is a motorway in North Macedonia forming part of the E75. It spans 173 kilometers (107 mi) as a four-lane, tolled, controlled-access highway. It crosses the country from north to south, starting at the border with Serbia near Kumanovo and ending at the Evzoni-Bogorodica border crossing with Greece near Gevgelija. As a part of the Pan-European corridor X (along with the E70), connecting to North Macedonia's biggest cities, it is one of the vital highways for Macedonian infrastructure, and significant works are currently undergoing for its reconstruction and enhancement.

== Route ==
The motorway begins right after the North Macedonia–Serbia border checkpoint and it continues as a first class motorway for approximately 40 km, when it reaches the Skopje Airport and the interchange with the A2. Nevertheless, in the 30-kilometer (19 mi) part between Skopje Airport and Veles, the motorway splits, creating a gradual distance of several kilometers. The northbound route is the postulated motorway route whilst the slightly longer southbound route, with dangerous bends, is the old road and is being used as a freeway as it is only one-way. Currently, enhancement works are being undertaken in this part. Also, the 33-kilometer (21 mi) Smokvica–Demir Kapija section was finished in 2018, thus providing a highway between the Serbian and Greek borders.

== Pictures ==
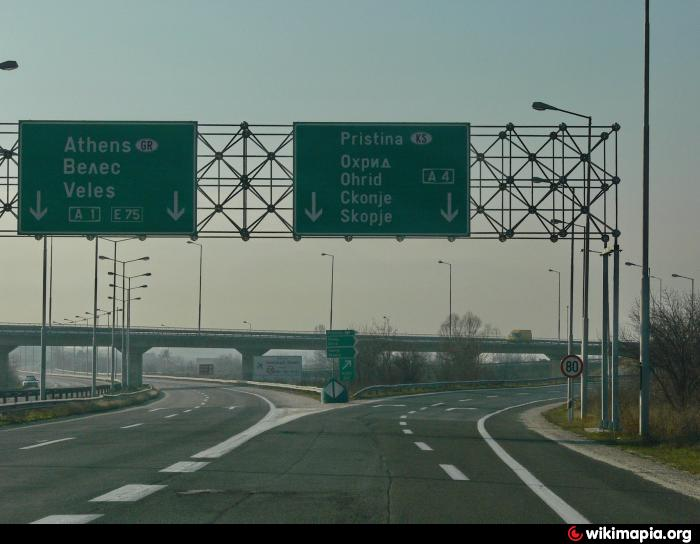
A1/A2 interchange

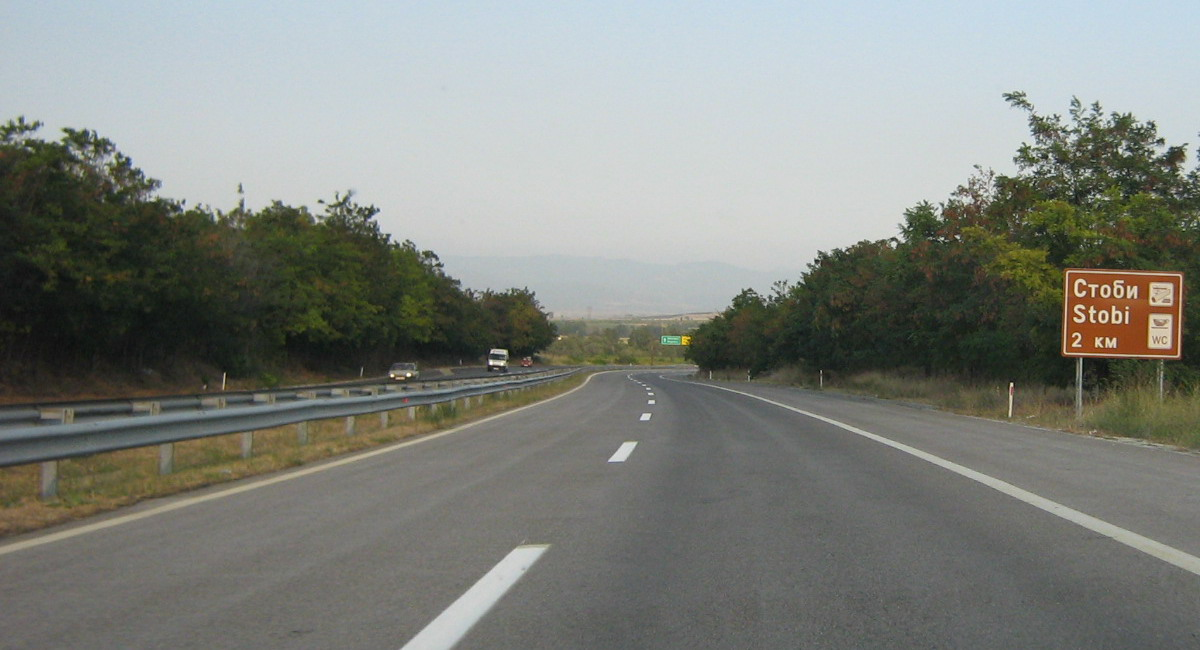
A1 near Stobi

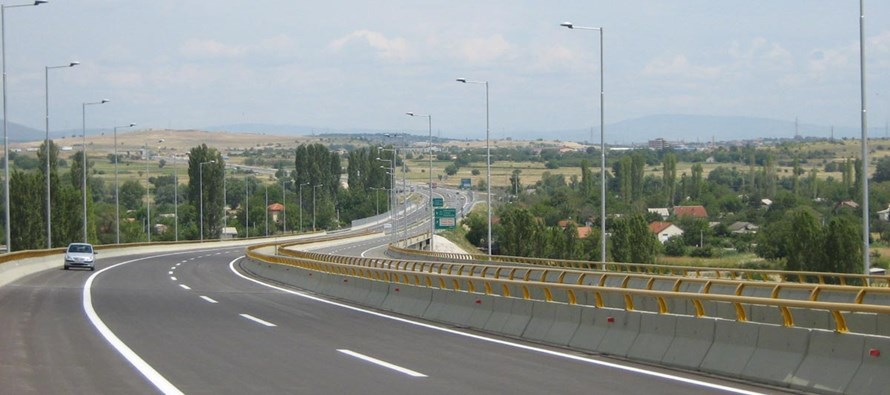
A1 north-west Skopje (Skopje bypass)

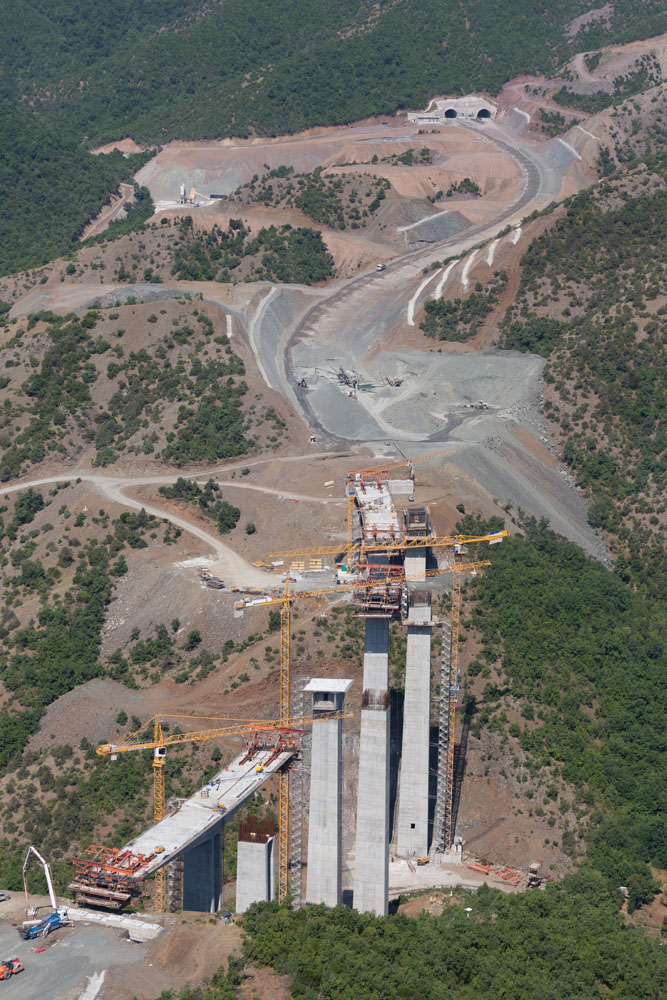
Demir Kapija-Smokvica highway construction

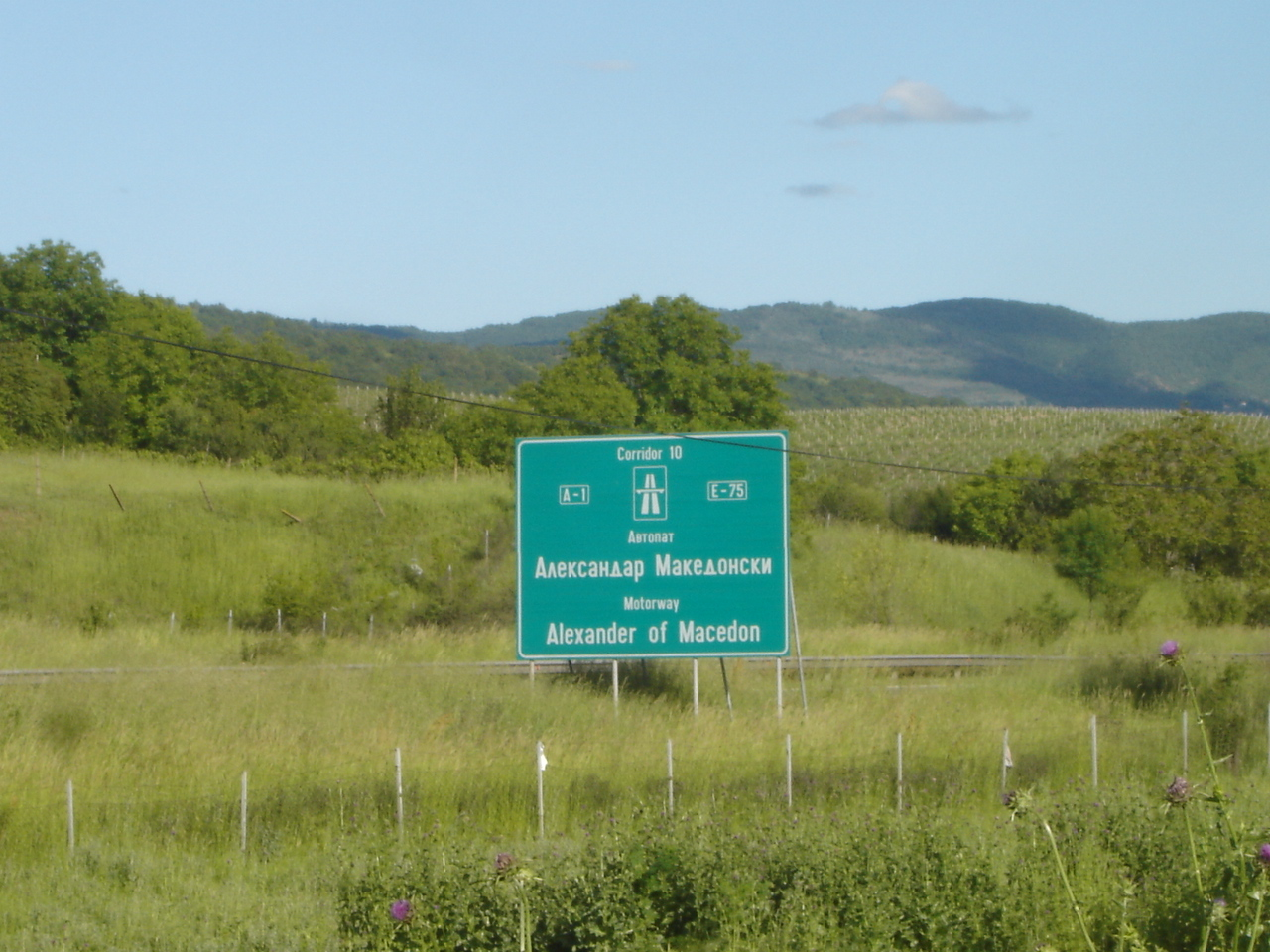
Signpost with former motorway name

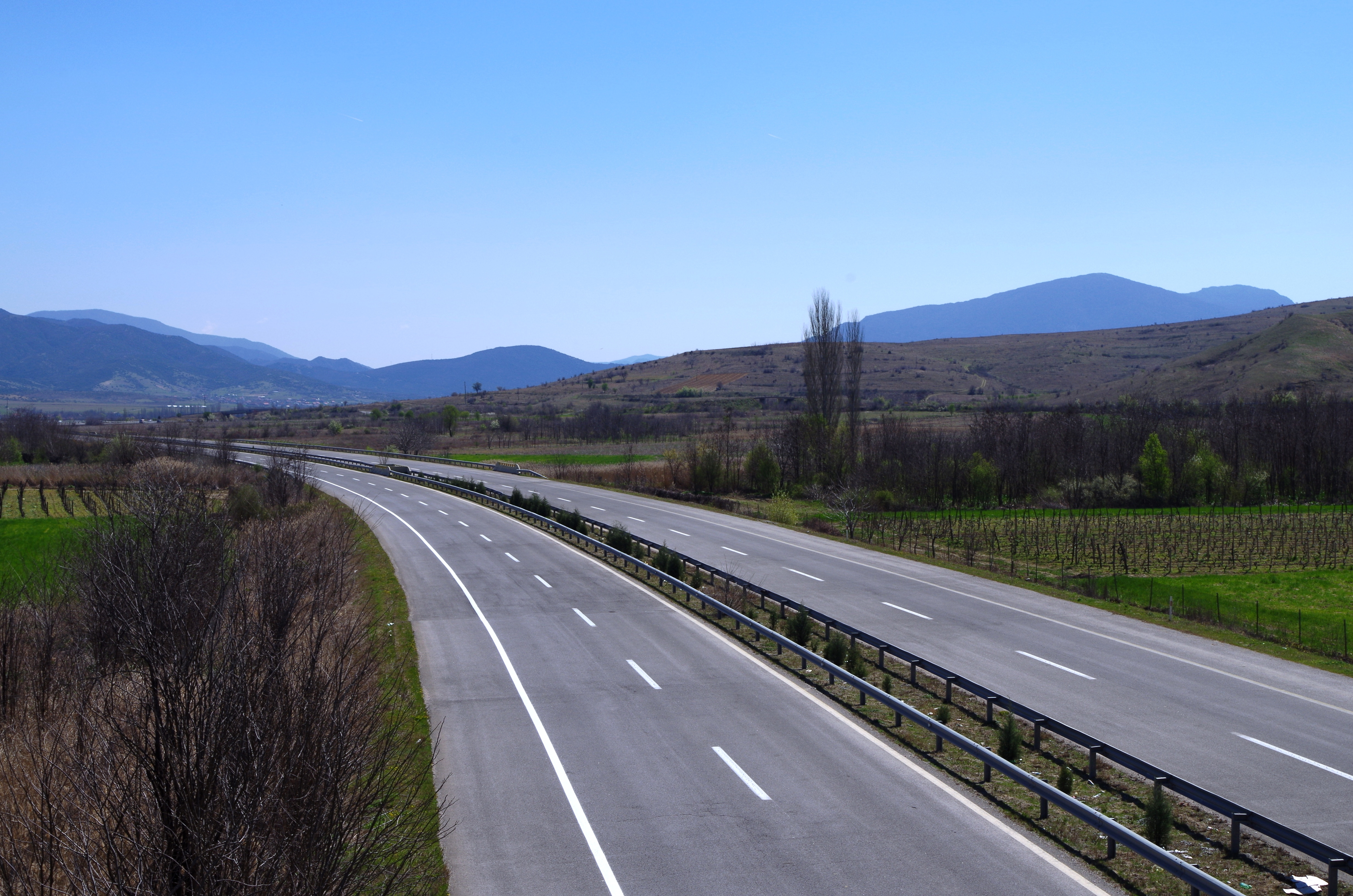
Highway section Veles - Demir Kapija

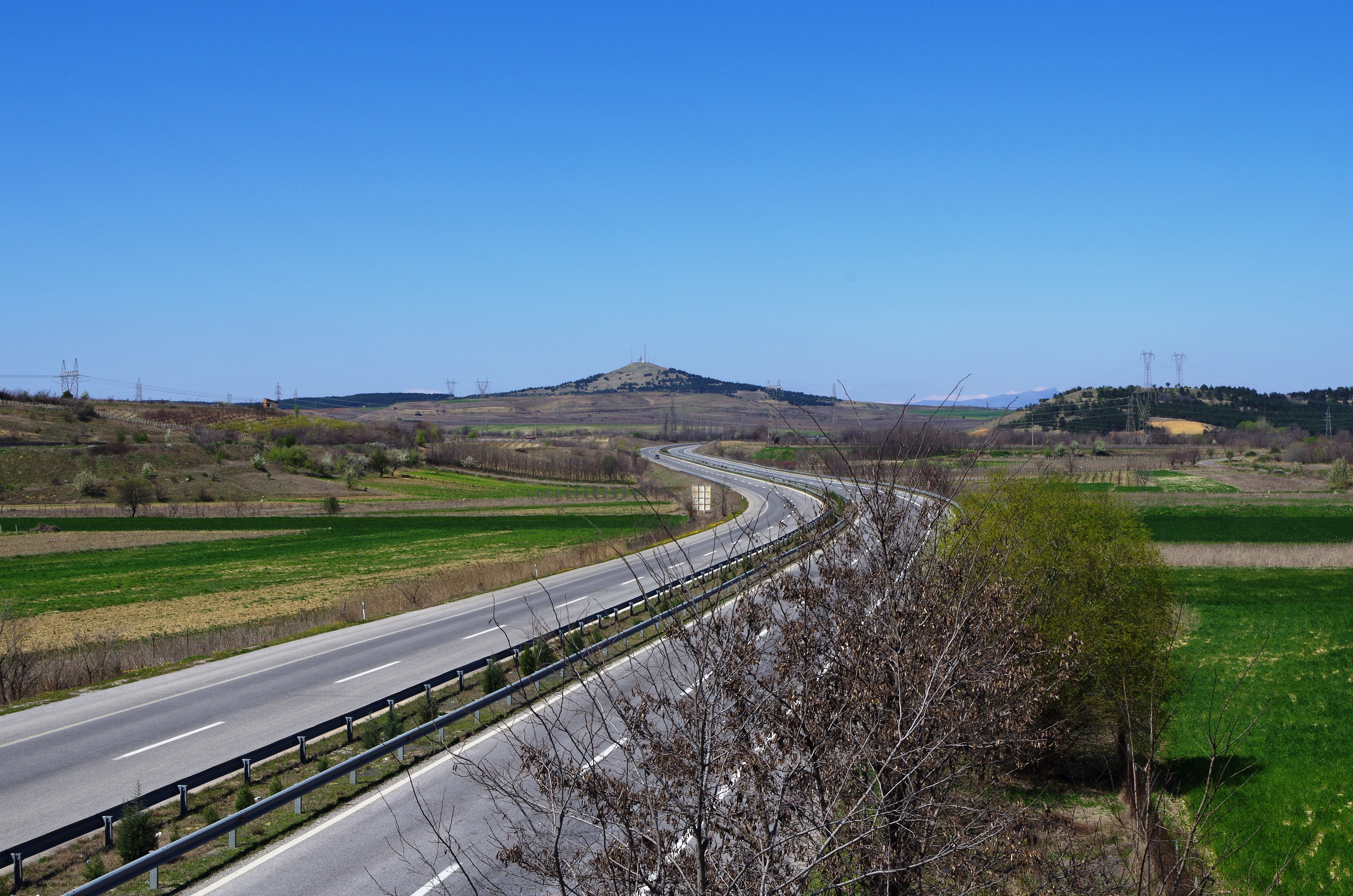
Highway section Negotino-Demir Kapija

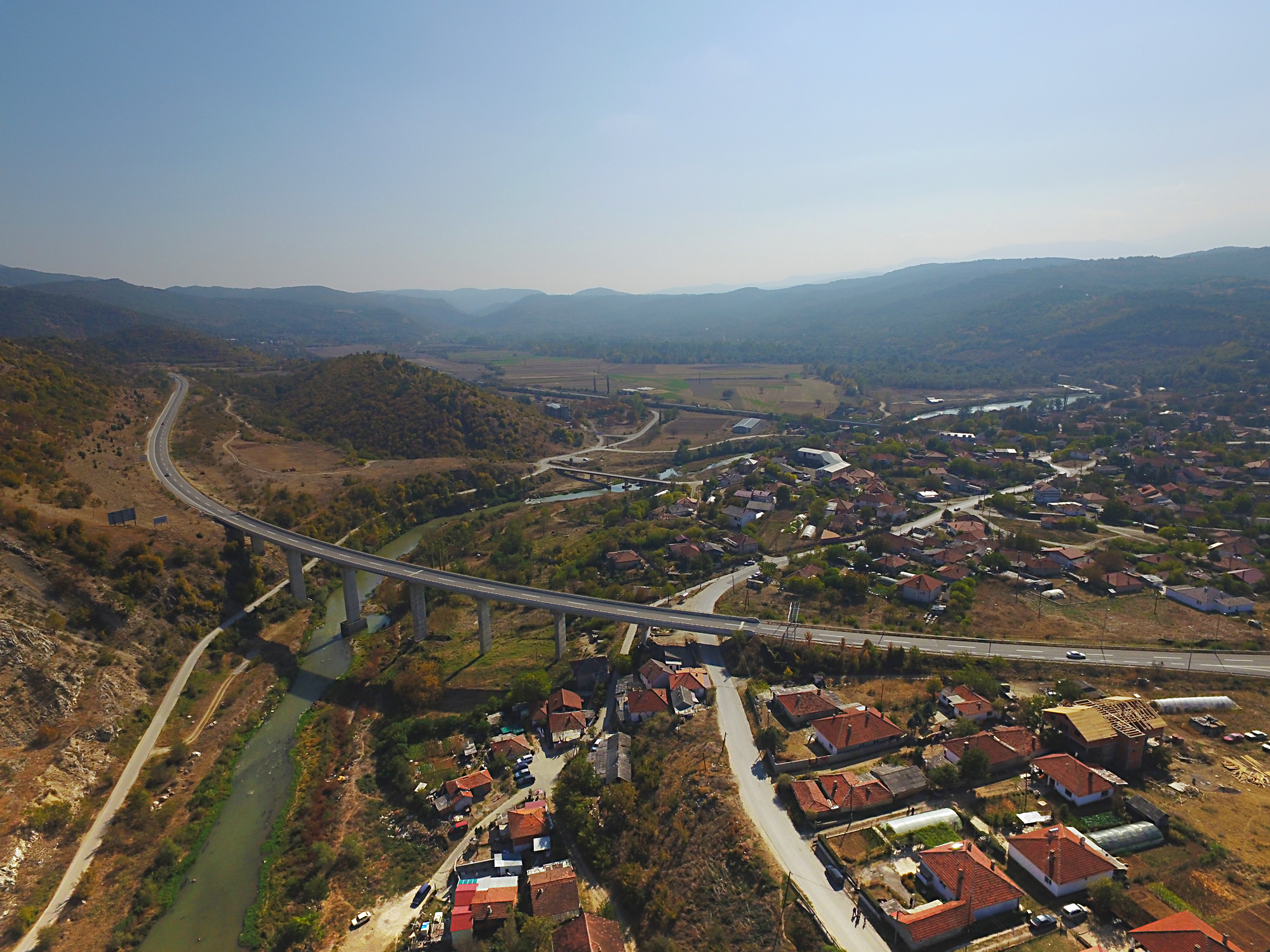
Skopje-Veles highway section (near Katlanovo)

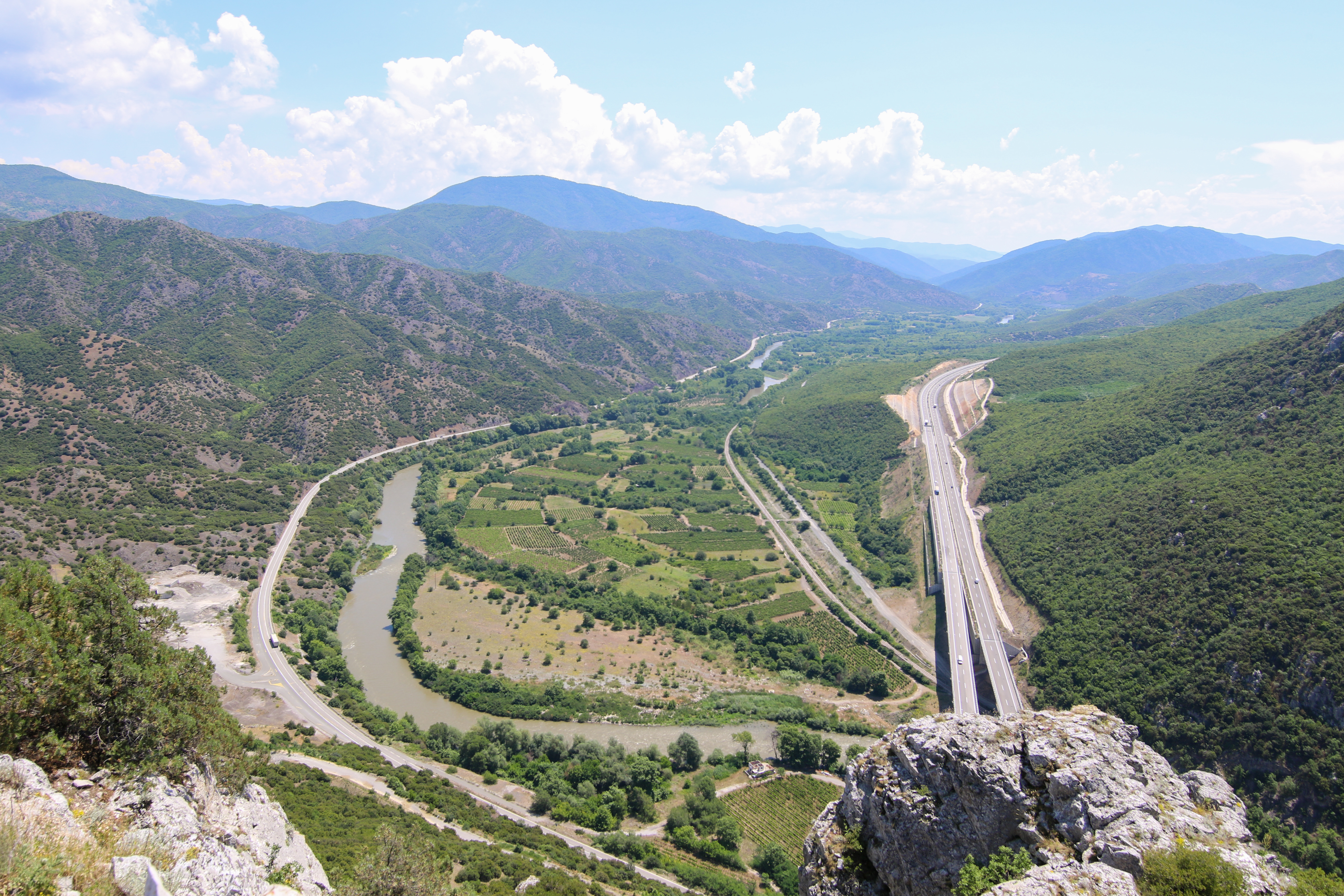
The highway near (regional road 1102), the road to the village Klisura, and the Vardar

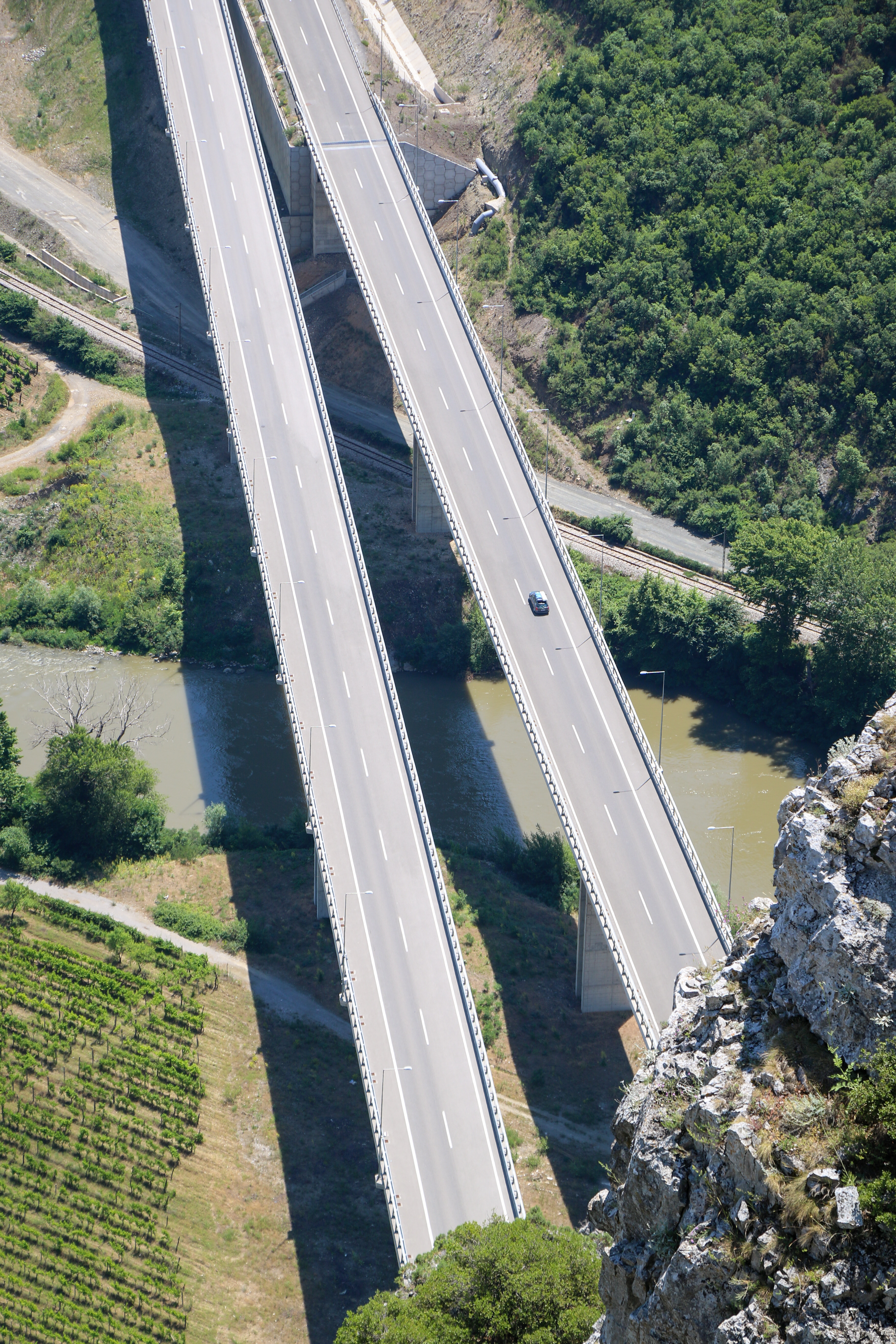
The highway over Vardar at Demir Kapija near Klisura
