= Raduša, Saraj =

Raduša Радуша Radushë
- Village
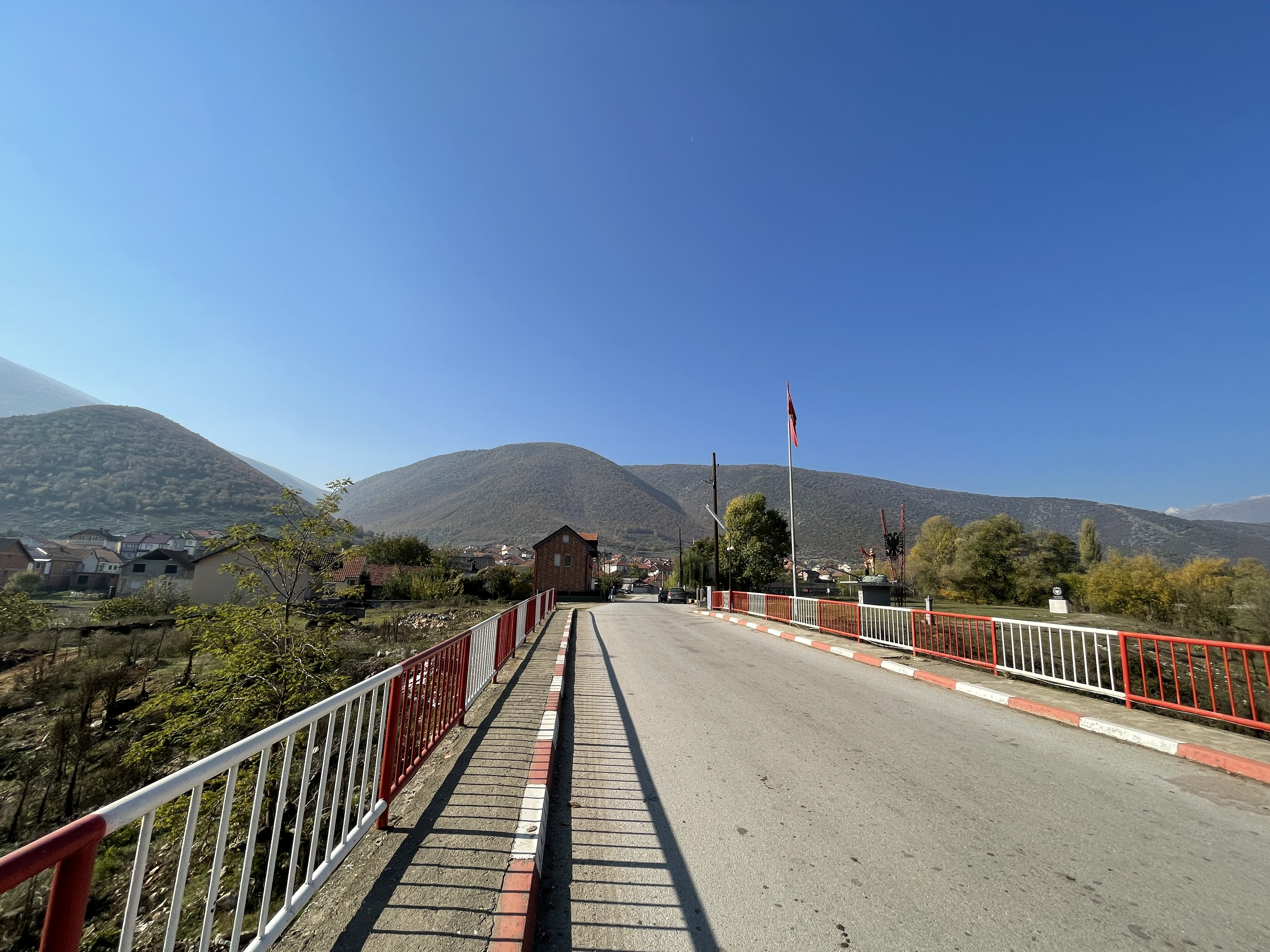
- View of the village

- Location within North Macedonia
- Coordinates: 42°05′N 21°13′E
- Country: North Macedonia
- Region: Skopje
- Municipality: Saraj

Population (2021)
  - Total: 1,533
- Time zone: UTC+1 (CET)
  - Summer (DST): UTC+2 (CEST)
- Car plates: SK
- Website: .

Raduša (Macedonian: Радуша, Albanian: Radushë) is a village in the municipality of Saraj, North Macedonia.

== Demographics ==
According to the 2021 census, the village had a total of 1,533 inhabitants. Ethnic groups in the village include:

- Albanians 1.447
- Others 86

Year	Macedonian	Albanian	Turks	Romani	Vlachs	Serbs	Bosniaks	Others	Total
2002	2	1.884	...	...	...	...	2	4	1.892
2021	...	1.447	...	...	...	...	...	86	1.533
