= Novo Selo, Novo Selo =

Novo Selo Ново Село
- Village
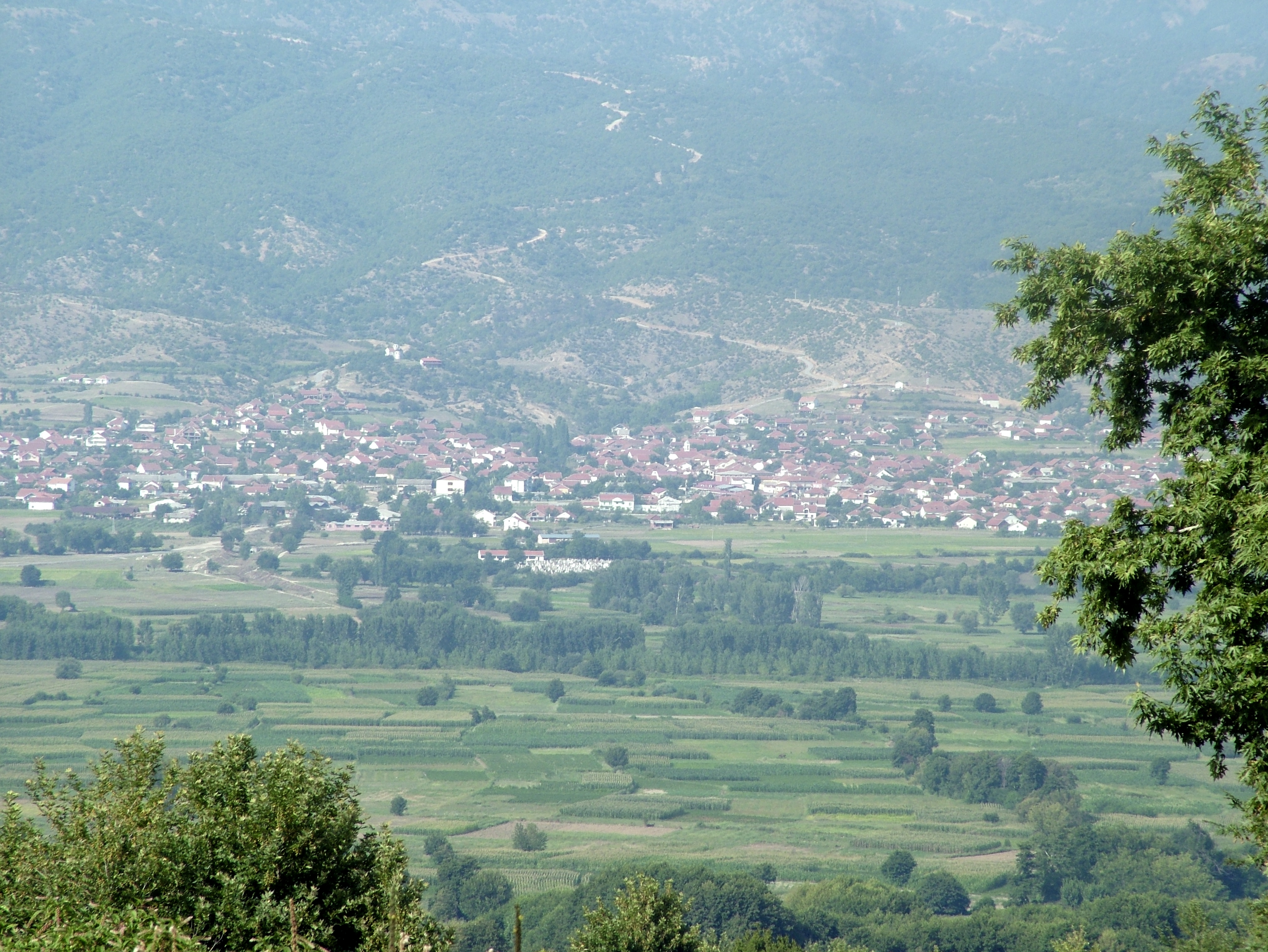
- View of Novo Selo

- Location within North Macedonia
- Coordinates: 41°24′50″N 22°52′51″E
- Country: North Macedonia
- Region: Southeastern
- Municipality: Novo Selo
- Elevation: 238 m (781 ft)

Population (2002)
  - Total: 2,756
- Time zone: UTC+1 (CET)
  - Summer (DST): UTC+2 (CEST)
- Vehicle registration: SR

Novo Selo (Macedonian: Ново Село) is a large village in the southeastern part of North Macedonia. It is the administrative centre of the eponymous municipality. Located in the valley of the Strumica River 9 km from the Bulgarian border, and close to border with Greece, it has a population of 2,756 as of 2002. Novo Selo lies, 238 m above sea level. The etymology of the village comes from Slavic languages meaning new village, Novo Selo.

== Demographics ==
According to the 2002 census, the village had a total of 2,756 inhabitants. Ethnic groups in the village include:

- Macedonians 2,726
- Serbs 11
- Romani 3
- Bosniaks 2
- Others 14

As of 2021, the village of Novo Selo has 1,967 inhabitants and the ethnic composition was the following:

- Macedonians – 1,788
- Albanians – 2
- Serbs – 2
- others – 9
- Person without Data - 166

== Bulgarian military cemetery ==
The Bulgarian military cemetery near Novo Selo is the final resting place of 71 Bulgarian military men of the 2nd Infantry Thracian Division and the 11th Infantry Macedonian Division who perished during the First and Second Balkan War and the First World War. While most of the soldiers were from various parts of modern Bulgaria, among the buried are also 15 people from Vardar Macedonia (two of them from Novo Selo), three people from Greek Macedonia, two from the Western Outlands in modern Serbia and one each from Eastern Thrace in modern Turkey, from Kosovo and from Dobruja. One Serbian prisoner of war and later two Serbian gendarmes were also interred at the cemetery, which was used as an argument in 1966 by the local mayor to save the cemetery from planned destruction (as happened to most Bulgarian cemeteries in the Macedonian SR of Yugoslavia) by proclaiming it a Serbian one.

Surrounded by a stone fence, the cemetery has identical crosses of valour over the graves, with the name of the interred, his rank, date of birth and death and native place also inscribed. A common memorial was erected in the central part, featuring a carved cross of valour and the inscription „Българио, за тебе тѣ умрѣха“ ("O Bulgaria, for you they died", from national writer Ivan Vazov's The New Graveyard Above Slivnitsa 1885 poem).

During the past years the initial cement crosses were shattered or damaged due to the weathering of the cement, while the central memorial was torn down by treasure hunters. However, in 2004 local citizens notified Bulgarian National Historical Museum director Bozhidar Dimitrov about the cemetery and its bad condition, who in his turn informed President of Bulgaria Georgi Parvanov. With the president's call to reconstruct the cemetery and with his political support, Bulgarian ambassador to the Republic of Macedonia Miho Mihov helped to observe all respective formalities to obtain a permission from the Macedonian authorities. Meanwhile, the Pliska Association produced exact marble copies of the original crosses. An official permission was received on 19 October 2006 and the reconstruction began, supported by locals and the Novo Selo municipal administration.

On 4 November 2006, an Eastern Orthodox holiday of Archangel Michael, the renovated cemetery was officially inaugurated with a military and a religious ceremony paying tribute to the perished Bulgarian soldiers. The ceremony was attended by Georgi Parvanov, a number of officials and citizens of Bulgaria and Macedonia.

The Novo Selo cemetery is the second reconstructed Bulgarian military cemetery in North Macedonia after the one in the village of Capari.
