= Miladinovci =

Miladinovci Миладиновци
- Village
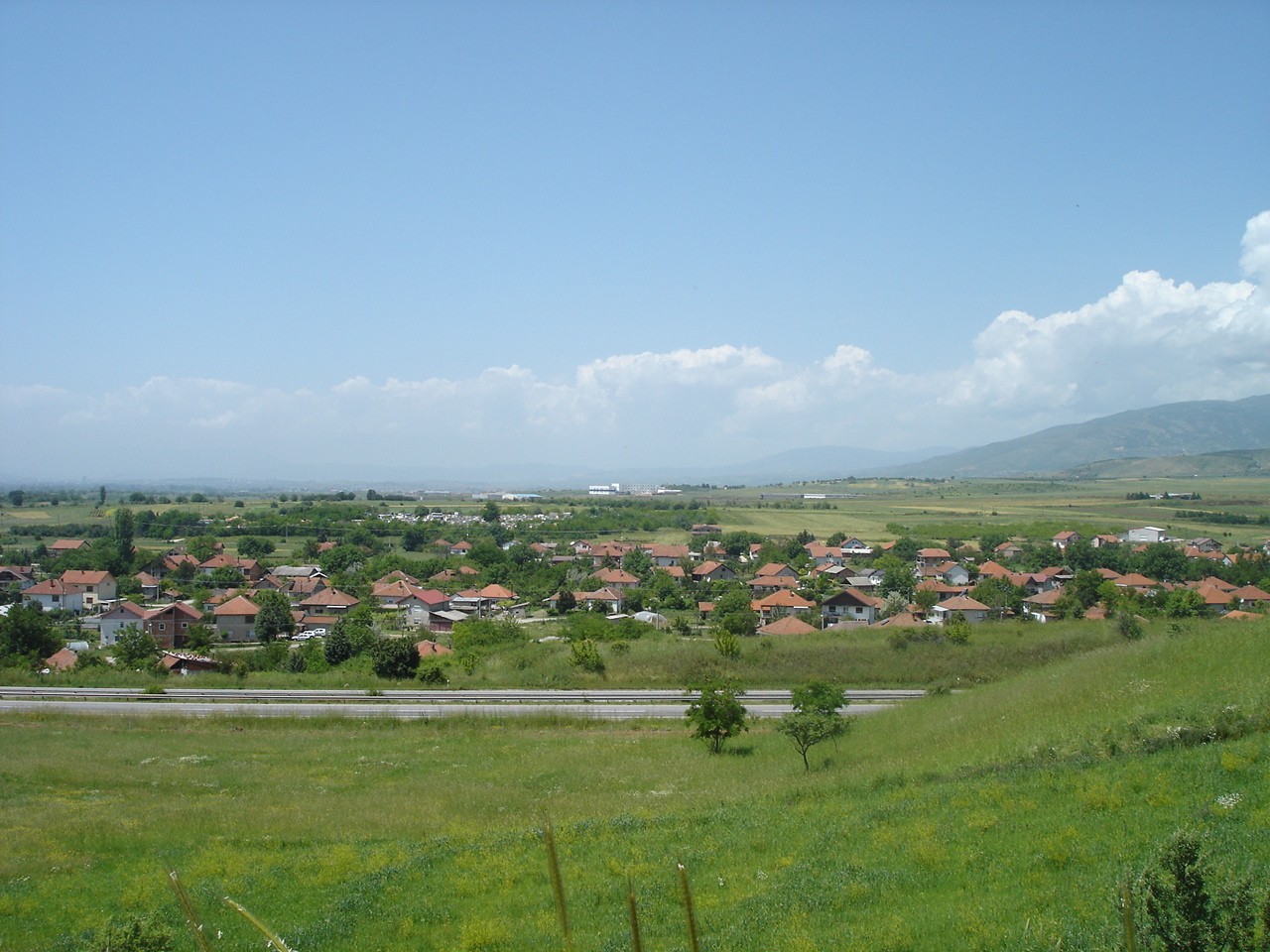

- Location within North Macedonia
- Country: North Macedonia
- Region: Skopje
- Municipality: Ilinden

Population (2021)
  - Total: 1,272
- Time zone: UTC+1 (CET)
  - Summer (DST): UTC+2 (CEST)
- Car plates: SK
- Website: .

Miladinovci (Macedonian: Миладиновци) is a village in the Ilinden Municipality of North Macedonia.

== Demographics ==
As of the 2021 census, Miladinovci had 1,272 residents with the following ethnic composition:

- Macedonians 1,101
- Roma 70
- Persons for whom data are taken from administrative sources 56
- Serbs 31
- Others 14

According to the 2002 census, the village had a total of 1,276 inhabitants. Ethnic groups in the village include:

- Macedonians 1,159
- Turks 2
- Serbs 34
- Romani 62
- Others 19
