= Blace, Čučer-Sandevo =

Blace Блаце Bllacë
- Village
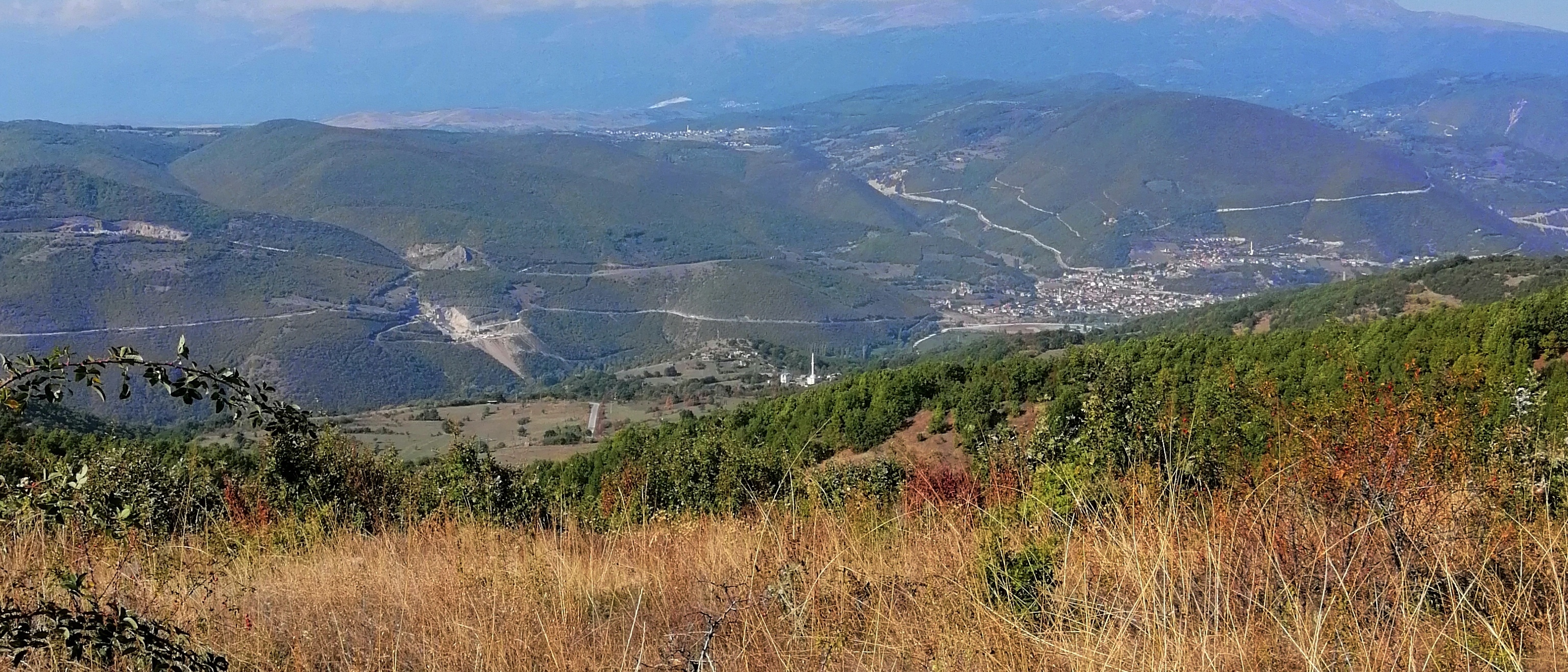

- Location within North Macedonia
- Coordinates: 42°9′8.67″N 21°19′57.81″E
- Country: North Macedonia
- Region: Skopje
- Municipality: Čučer-Sandevo

Government
  - Mayor: Nexhdet Sabediu BDI

Population (2021)
  - Total: 862
- Time zone: UTC+1 (CET)
  - Summer (DST): UTC+2 (CEST)
- Car plates: SK

Blace (Macedonian: Блаце, Albanian: Bllacë) is a village in the municipality of Čučer-Sandevo, Republic of North Macedonia.

== History ==
On the 1st of November 1944, the village was the scene of a massacre in which a total of 120 Albanians were killed by the XVI Macedonian Partisan Brigade, led by Gligorije Šaranović-"Gliša", under the pretext of collaboration with the occupier.

During the Kosovo War, Blace temporarily hosted around 65,000 ethnic Albanian refugees from Kosovo.

== Demographics ==
As of the 2021 census, Blace had 862 residents with the following ethnic composition:

- Albanians 760
- Persons for whom data are taken from administrative sources 102

According to the 2002 census, the village had a total of 972 inhabitants. Ethnic groups in the village include:

- Albanians 968
- Macedonians 1
- Others 3
