= Cabinet of Nikola Gruevski IV =

Fourth Cabinet of Nikola Gruevski
- 11th Cabinet of North Macedonia

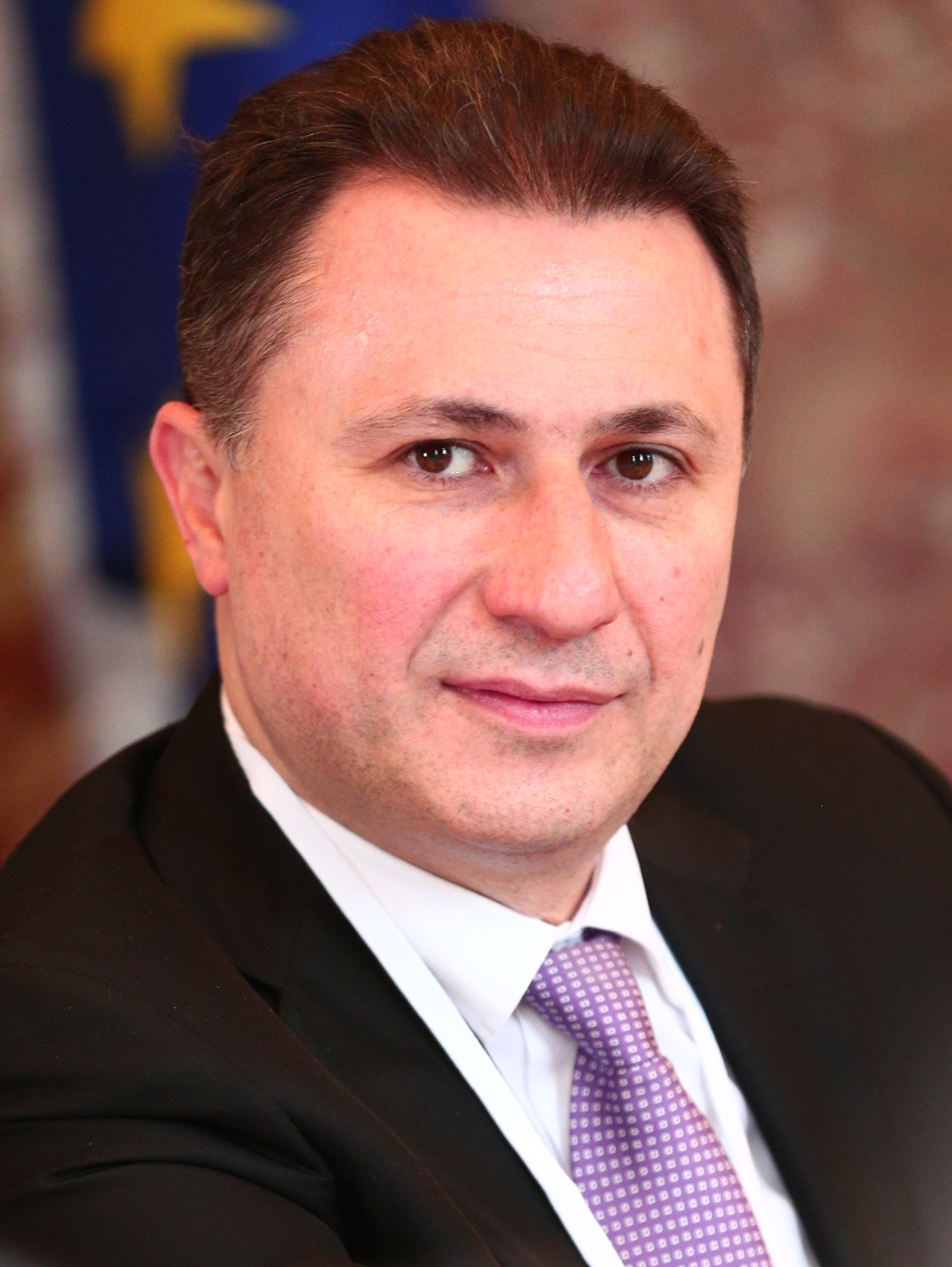
- Date formed: 19 June 2014
- Date dissolved: 31 May 2017

People and organisations
- Head of state: Gjorge Ivanov
- Head of government: Nikola Gruevski; Emil Dimitriev
- Member party: VMRO-DPMNE
- Status in legislature: Coalition
- Opposition party: Social Democratic Union
- Opposition leader: Zoran Zaev

History
- Elections: 2014 Macedonian general election 2016 Macedonian parliamentary election
- Predecessor: Gruevski III
- Successor: Zaev I

The fourth Cabinet of Prime Minister Nikola Gruevski is the Republic of Macedonia Government cabinet announced on 19 June 2014. It is the 11th cabinet of the Republic of Macedonia. Gruevski's second cabinet was formed following the April 2014 election won by the right-wing VMRO-DPMNE.

Parties included in the government:

- Internal Macedonian Revolutionary Organization – Democratic Party for Macedonian National Unity (VMRO-DPMNE)
- Democratic Union for Integration (DUI/BDI)
- United Party for Emancipation (OPE)

After the 2015 protests and according to the Przino Agreement, in November 2015 the two members of the Social Democratic Union of Macedonia (SDSM) were entered into the government.

== List of ministers and portfolios ==
| Minister | Party | Portfolio | Period |
|---|---|---|---|
| Nikola Gruevski | VMRO-DPMNE | Prime Minister | 27 August 2006 – 18 January 2016 |
| Emil Dimitriev | VMRO-DPMNE | Prime Minister | 18 January 2016 – 1 June 2017 |
| Zoran Stavreski | VMRO-DPMNE | | |
| Zoran Stavreski | VMRO-DPMNE | Minister of Finance | 8 July 2009 – 14 June 2016 |
| Musa Xhaferi | DUI | Deputy Prime Minister | 27 August 2006 – 4 April 2016 |
| Festim Halili | DUI | Deputy Prime Minister | 4 April 2016 – 1 June 2017 |
| Fatmir Besimi | DUI | Deputy Prime Minister | 18 February 2013 – 4 April 2016 |
| Arbr Ademi | DUI | Deputy Prime Minister | 4 April 2016 – 1 June 2017 |
| Vladimir Peshevski | VMRO-DPMNE | Deputy Prime Minister | 10 July 2009 – 1 June 2017 |
| Nikola Poposki | VMRO-DPMNE | Minister of Foreign Affairs | 28 July 2011 – 1 Јune 2017 |
| Zoran Jolevski | VMRO-DPMNE | Minister of Defense | 19 June 2014 – 1 June 2017 |
| Gordana Jankuloska | VMRO-DPMNE | Minister of Internal Affairs | 27 August 2006 – 12 May 2015 |
| Mitko Chavkov | VMRO-DPMNE | Minister of Internal Affairs | 13 May 2015 – 11 November 2015 |
| Oliver Spasovski | SDSM | Minister of Internal Affairs | 11 November 2015 – 19 May 2016 |
| Mitko Chavkov | VMRO-DPMNE | Minister of Internal Affairs | 20 May 2016 – 31 August 2016 |
| Oliver Andonov | VMRO-DPMNE | Minister of Internal Affairs | 1 September 2016 – 2 September 2016 |
| Oliver Spasovski | SDSM | Minister of Internal Affairs | 2 September 2016 – 29 December 2016 |
| Agim Nuhiu | DUI | Minister of Internal Affairs | 29 December 2016 – 1 June 2017 |
| Adnan Jashari | DUI | Minister of Justice | 19 June 2014 – 4 April 2016 |
| Valdet Dzaferi | DUI | Minister of Justice | 4 April 2016 – 1 June 2017 |
| Valon Saracini | DUI | Minister of Economy | 28 July 2011 – 4 April 2016 |
| Driton Kuchi | DUI | Minister of Economy | 4 April 2016 – 1 June 2017 |
| Mihail Cvetkov | VMRO-DPMNE | Minister of Agriculture, Forestry and Watersupply | 19 June 2014 – 1 Јune 2017 |
| Mile Janakieski | VMRO-DPMNE | Minister of Transport and Communication | 27 August 2006 – 12 May 2015 |
| Vlado Misajlovski | VMRO-DPMNE | Minister of Transport and Communication | 13 May 2015 – 1 June 2017 |
| Nikola Todorov | VMRO-DPMNE | Minister of Health | 28 July 2011 – 1 June 2017 |
| Abdylaqim Ademi | DUI | Minister of Education and Science | 19 June 2014 – 4 April 2016 |
| Pishtar Lutfiu | DUI | Minister of Education and Science | 4 April 2016 – 1 June 2017 |
| Ivo Ivanovski | VMRO-DPMNE | Minister of Information Society and Administration | 21 December 2006 – 11 November 2015 |
| Marta Tomovska-Arsovska | VMRO-DPMNE | Minister of Information Society and Administration | 11 November 2015 – 1 June 2017 |
| Lirim Shabani | DUI | Minister of Local Self-Government | 19 June 2014 – 4 April 2016 |
| Shiret Elezi | DUI | Minister of Local Self-Government | 4 April 2016 – 1 June 2017 |
| Elizabeta Kančeska-Milevska | VMRO-DPMNE | Minister of Culture | 26 July 2008 – 1 June 2017 |
| Dime Spasov | VMRO-DPMNE | Minister of Labor and Social Policy | 29 May 2013 – 11 November 2015 |
| Frosina Remenski | SDSM | Minister of Labor and Social Policy | 11 November 2015 – 18 May 2016 |
| Dime Spasov | VMRO-DPMNE | Minister of Labor and Social Policy | 18 May 2016 – 29 December 2016 |
| Ibrahim Ibrahimi | DUI | Minister of Labor and Social Policy | 29 December 2016 – 1 June 2017 |
| Furqan Chaco | DUI | Minister without portfolio | 19 June 2014 – |
| Nedžet Mustafa | OPE | Minister without portfolio | 26 July 2008 – |
| Vele Samak | Independent | Minister without portfolio | 27 August 2006 – |
| Bill Pavleski | Independent | Minister without portfolio | 28 July 2011 – |
| Jerry Naumoff | Independent | Minister without portfolio | 29 May 2013 – |
| Visar Fida | DUI | Minister without portfolio | 19 June 2014 – 11 November 2015 |
| Arlind Zeqiri | DUI | Minister without portfolio | 11 November 2015 – |
| Goran Mickovski | Independent | Minister without portfolio | 19 June 2014 – |
