= Rapid Deployment Unit =

Special police unit in North Macedonia

Rapid Deployment Unit Единица за брзо распоредување
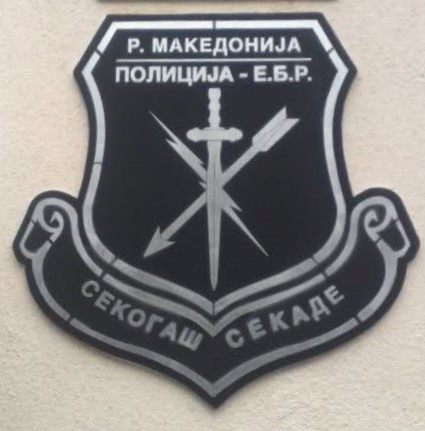
- Logo of Rapid Deployment Unit
- Abbreviation: EBR (MKD; cyr: ЕБР)
- Motto: Always, everywhere Секогаш, секаде

Agency overview
- Formed: 26 August 2001
- Preceding agency: Lions (police unit)

Jurisdictional structure
- Operations jurisdiction: North Macedonia
- Legal jurisdiction: Ministry of Internal Affairs
- Governing body: Government of North Macedonia

Operational structure
- Overseen by: Ministry of Internal Affairs
- Headquarters: Gjorche Petrov Base Skopje
- Elected officer responsible: Mitko Chavkov, Ministry of Internal Affairs
- Parent agency: Government of North Macedonia

Website
- www.mvr.gov.mk

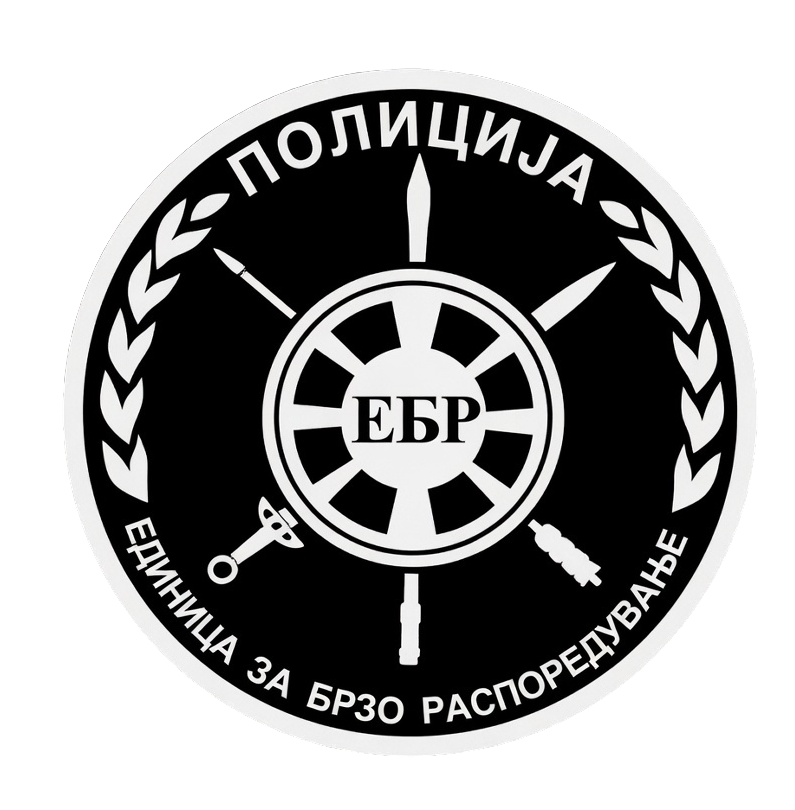
EBR Patch

Rapid Deployment Unit is a paramilitary police unit of the Ministry of Internal Affairs in the Republic of North Macedonia. The unit specialized in quick response to emergencies with SWAT unit tactics.

== Mission ==
The unit's missions primarily involve anti-irregular military in urban and hard-to-reach areas, apprehension of armed and dangerous criminals, commando style raids on key targets, counterinsurgency in urban and hard-to-reach areas, executive protection, high-risk tactical law enforcement situations, hostage rescue crisis management, maneuver warfare, operating in difficult to access terrain, providing security in areas at risk of attack or terrorism, special reconnaissance in difficult to access and dangerous areas, support crowd control and riot control, and tactical domestic counterterrorism.

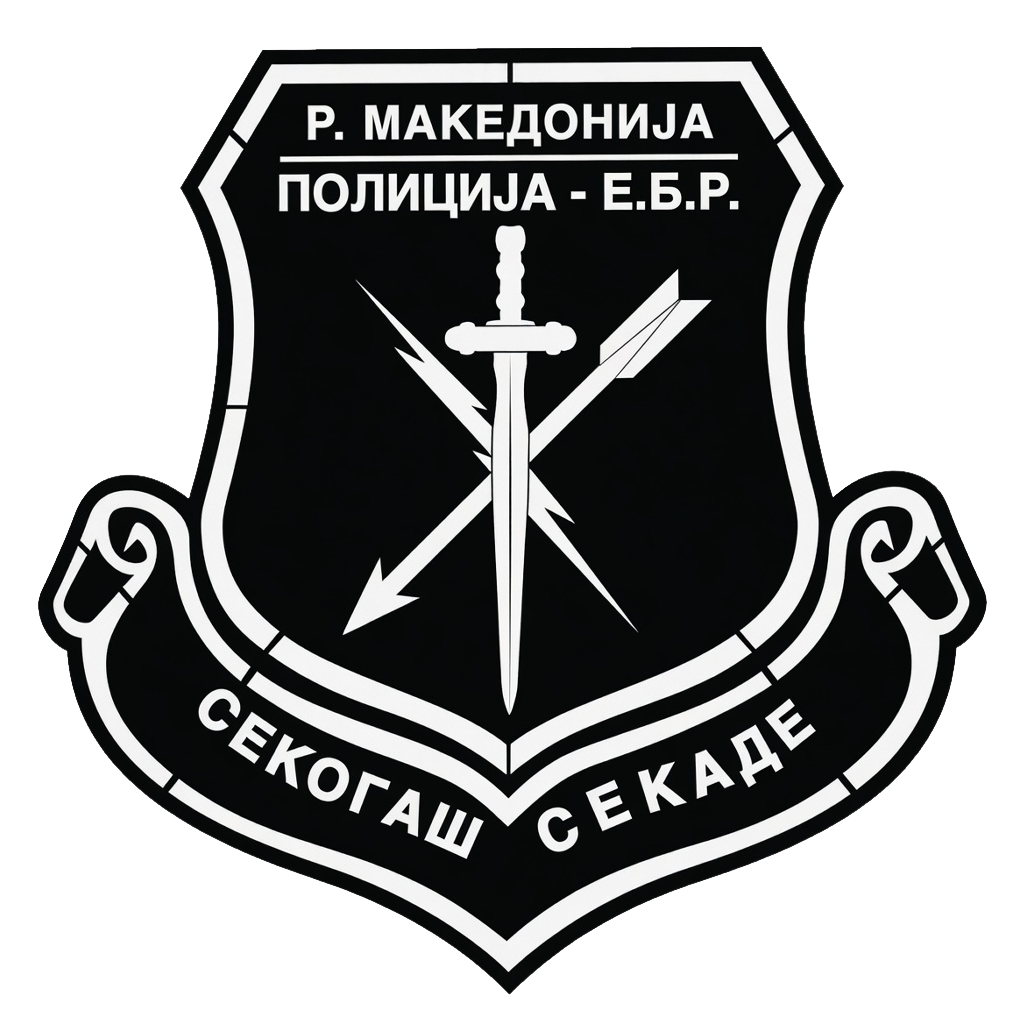
EBR Emblem

== Notable domestic missions ==
- 2015 Kumanovo clashes

== See also ==
Special Operations Unit - Tigers
Lions (police unit)
Alpha (Police Unit)
Border Police
Special Support Unit
Ministry of Internal Affairs
Police of North Macedonia
Lake Patrol
