= 2001 Vejce massacre =

Ambush near Vejce, Macedonia

Vejce massacre
- Part of the 2001 insurgency in Macedonia
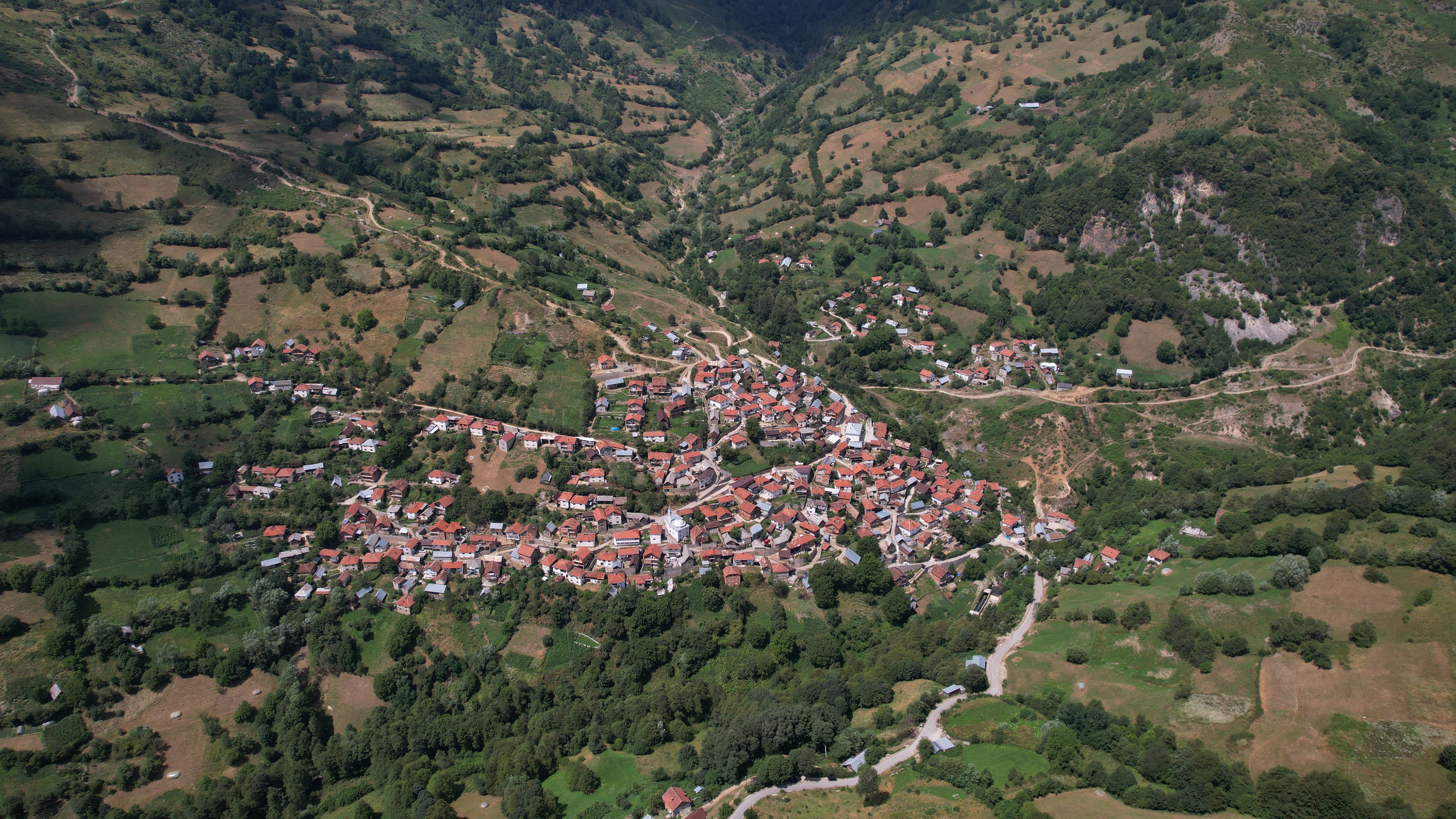
Date	28 April 2001 at about 5:45 p.m
Location	Between Selce and Vejce
Result	NLA victory: Anti-Albanian sentiment spreads across the country with anti-Albanian protests and riots across the city; ICTY launches a war crime inquiry in November 2001

Belligerents
Macedonia	National Liberation Army

Commanders and leaders
Robert Petkovski †; Boban Trajkovski †; Igor Kosteski †; Mile Janevski †	Unknown

Units involved
Macedonian Army; Special Operations Regiment; Special Forces Battalion “Wolves”; Ministry of Interior; Macedonian Police; Special Support Unit; Bitola Unit	Unknowm

Strength
8 soldiers 8 policemen	Unknown

Casualties and losses
4 soldiers killed 1 Humvee destroyed 1 Humvee damaged 4 policemen killed 1 Lada Niva destroyed 1 Lada Niva damaged	None

The Vejce massacre, also known as the Vejce ambush, was carried out by the National Liberation Army against a convoy consisting of Macedonian special forces near the village of Vejce during the 2001 insurgency in Macedonia. During the attack, eight members were killed.

== Ambush ==
On 28 April 2001, 16 Macedonian soldiers and police officers were carrying out a routine patrol. At approximately 5:45 p.m., ethnic Albanian militants carried out an ambush on the convoy positioned between the villages Selce and Vejce. Out of the 16 members, 8 were killed, half of the total.

The killed officers Marjan Božinovski, Kire Kostadinovski, Boško Najdovski and Ilče Stojanovski were members of the special police unit from Bitola. The killed soldiers Robert Petkovski, Boban Trajkovski, Igor Kosteski and Mile Janevski were sergeants. A Hummer and a Lada Niva were destroyed, and other two vehicles sustained damage. According to Macedonian news sources and the Macedonian Ministry of Internal Affairs, the soldiers were mutilated and burned alive.

== Aftermath ==
According to Amnesty International, the Macedonian government labeled the Vejce ambush as a crime against humanity. The Macedonian Ministry of Internal Affairs also designated it as a terrorist attack. Per Macedonian news sources, autopsies were carried out in a military morgue. Subsequently, news of the deaths fueled local unrest, sparking riots against ethnic Albanians in several towns and cities across Macedonia. These disturbances encompassed the burning and vandalizing of shops and mosques. A war crime inquiry regarding the ambush was launched by the International Criminal Tribunal for the former Yugoslavia (ICTY) in November 2001. The ICTY returned the case to the local Macedonian courts on 2007.

The killed members of the state forces were commemorated for the first time in 2002 at their graves. Memorial plaques were also set up in their birthplaces. In 2009, the Makedonska Kamenica Municipality named an elementary school in honor of Mile Janevski and affirmed the day of the ambush as the school's patron day. A monument has been created in the center of Bitola, while a memorial also opened in Dračevo, Skopje, in 2013. Ethnic Albanians reacted negatively to the commemorations and in 2003, a group of them blocked a convoy of participants commemorating. Some monuments were destroyed.

== Reactions ==
The Secretary General of NATO at the time, George Robertson, condemned the ambush, stating: "I condemn the cowardly acts of the extremists and my message is simple: the violence must end and their tactics will not be successful." The attack was also condemned by the European Union's foreign policy chief Javier Solana. Anthropologist Vasiliki Neofotistos wrote of "the gruesome event that came to be known as the Vejce massacre" and its aftermath:

"On 28 April NLA insurgents killed eight Macedonian male commandos in the Macedonian Army Special Forces, also known as "Wolves" (Volci), in an ambush near the village of Vejce, nine miles north of Tetovo. According to the eyewitness account of the only Macedonian soldier who managed to escape the ambush, the assailants were bearded men. The killing shocked public opinion because the reportedly bearded assailants used knives to dig out the eyes and cut off the ears and genitals of the Macedonian soldiers while the soldiers were still alive, and raised once again haunting questions concerning the origin of the people who committed these atrocious acts. The mutilation of the commandos' bodies, together with rumors about mujahideen groups operating in Macedonia, motivated people to action: in the city of Bitola (home of four of the commandos), Macedonians formed community self-defense groups; in Skopje, gunmen in a passing car opened fire on the Albanian Embassy and on an Albanian-owned pizzeria, killing an Albanian man; businesses and stores of Albanians and other Muslims in both cities were looted or burned."

According to Nikola Dimitrov in an interview with The Guardian:

"They were hit by everything," said Nikola Dimitrov, then-security adviser to President Boris Trajkovski. "They used hand grenades, rocket launchers and machine guns. He said the guerrilla's had gone out of their way to disfigure the corpses. "It's unbelievable, and it's going to damage the political process. Now it will be so difficult to proceed."

— Nikola Dimitrov

The leader of the NLA at the time, Ali Ahmeti, claimed that the ethnic Albanian fighters had not attacked the Macedonians, stating they were acting in self-defense and were fired on first by the Macedonian patrol. The claim was not independently confirmed. The United Nations Security Council condemned the ambush, calling it "cowardly" and "brutal".

== See also ==
- Karpalak ambush
- Ambush near Treboš
