= List of terrorist incidents in North Macedonia =

The list contains incidents in North Macedonia that have been classified as "terrorist" by the Government of North Macedonia and/or the United States Department of State.

== List ==
- Insurgency in the Republic of Macedonia (22 January–13 August 2001)
  - Tearce attack (22 January 2001)
  - Vejce massacre (28 April 2001)
  - Kumanovo water crisis (June 2001)
  - Karpalak ambush (8 August 2001)
- Kondovo Crisis (2004 and 2005)
- Smilkovci Lake killings (12 April 2012)
- Skopje government attack (28 October 2014)
- Gošince attack (21 April 2015)
- Kumanovo shootings (9–10 May 2015)

== See also ==
- Terrorism in Yugoslavia
- Terrorism in Europe
