= Gošince attack =

2015 attack in Macedonia

Date	21 April 2015
Location	Gošince border post, Lipkovo Municipality, Macedonia 42.2141°N 21.5172°E
Result	Departure of the militants and hostages escaped
Territorial changes	Macedonian border police control over the Gošince post restored after the departure of militants

Belligerents
Macedonia	Albanian group

Commanders and leaders
Unknown	Unknown

Units involved
Border police	Unknown

Strength
4 policemen	40 militants

Casualties and losses
4 captured (later escaped)	None
- Location of Gošince in the Republic of Macedonia

On 21 April 2015, 40 armed men with UÇK patches attacked a border police station located at Gošince, near the Kosovo border. The group tied and beat the policemen manning the outpost and stole weapons and radios. They stayed for a couple of hours, filming the event, and issued a message through an interpreter before leaving.

== Background ==
In 2001, a conflict erupted between Albanian insurgents and the Macedonian security forces. It ended with the Ohrid Framework Agreement, which gave more rights to Albanians. In return, the National Liberation Army disbanded and formed the ethnic Albanian political party Democratic Union for Integration. The village of Gošince is part of the municipality of Lipkovo, which is some 25 kilometers northeast from the capital of Skopje towards the border with Kosovo. The region was on the frontline of armed hostilities during the conflict. Gošince has been predominantly inhabited by Albanians. At the time, there was a political crisis in Macedonia, which erupted after a wiretapping scandal against the Prime Minister.

== Attack ==
On 21 April 2015, a group of 40 armed men with UÇK insignia attacked a border police station located at Gošince. The group tied the policemen and beat them, then stole their arms and communication devices; they stayed for a couple of hours, filming the event, and before they left for Kosovo, they issued this message through an interpreter:

"We are from UÇK. Tell them that neither Ali Ahmeti nor Nikola Gruevski can save you. We do not want any framework agreement and if we see you here again, we will kill you. We want our own state."

According to the spokesman of the Macedonian Ministry of Internal Affairs, one of the police officers freed the others and helped them to escape after the group left.

== Aftermath ==
The Macedonian Ministry of Interior declared the attack as a terrorist act. The police stepped up security in the area. A police officer was hospitalized. VMRO-DPMNE condemned the attack. For the Democratic Union for Integration, the incident is "an act that harms the agenda of Albanians in Macedonia, as well as the national agenda in general." Kosovo's Ministry of Internal Affairs also condemned the attack. The Russian Ministry of Foreign Affairs expressed concern over the attack.

On 22 April an unofficial police source alleged that the group was led by Xhevair Ademi, while other identified individuals were brothers Erhan and Kadir Bajrami, and a Faruk who managed the attack, all from Gjilan in Kosovo. The identified persons have been known to the Macedonian security service, as well as those of the region. According to Pristina media, on 22 April, the attack was claimed by the NLA, signed by "Commander Flamuri".

On 24 April, the opposition accused Prime Minister Nikola Gruevski of having staged the attack. The opposition's leader Zoran Zaev stated that there were strong indications that the event was invented by the government. On 26 April, Macedonian police recovered illegal arms from the villages of Gošince, Brest and Malina Mahala. Some of the arms found in Malina Mahala were those stolen in the attack. On 27 April, Osman Sulejman was indicted for the attack, while Mirsad Ndrecaj "Commander NATO" (a veteran in the 2001 conflict) was suggested by Interior Minister Gordana Jankuloska to have been involved in the attack, having assumed responsibility for the attack.

On 9 June, the Macedonian daily newspaper, Dnevnik, reported that the OSCE Mission to Skopje had advance knowledge of the Gošince border attack and that the OSCE Mission did not share this information with the security services. According to the Macedonian Ministry of Interior, members of the group that was involved in the 2015 Kumanovo clashes with Macedonian police admitted involvement in the attack. The prosecution accused the group of involvement in 2016.

== See also ==
- 2001 insurgency in Macedonia
- Operation Mountain Storm
- 2012 Republic of Macedonia inter-ethnic violence
- Smilkovci lake killings
- 2014 Macedonian government building attack
