= Goran Georgievski =

Nort Macedonian police commander (1969–2005)

- Born: 2 December 1969; Kumanovo, SFRY (today North Macedonia)
- Died: 4 April 2005 (aged 35); Kumanovo, Macedonia
- Resting place: Kumanovo Town Cemetery
- Other name: Mujo
- Police career
- Country: (North Macedonia) Macedonia
- Allegiance: Ministry of Internal Affairs
- Department: Lions (police unit)
- Service years: 2001-2004
- Rank: Police commander

Goran Georgievski - Mujo (2 December 1969 – 4 April 2005) was a police commander in the special police unit Lions in what is now North Macedonia.

Georgievski was born 2 December 1969 in Kumanovo, Socialist Federal Republic of Yugoslavia, now North Macedonia.

He was gunned down in front of a local nightclub in his home town. He was buried at Kumanovo Town Cemetery. The eulogy at his funeral was given by Lions spokesman Toni Mihajlovski, journalist Mirka Velinovska, actor Kiril Pop Hristov and others.
