= Tigers (police unit) =

Special Anti-terrorist Unit Специјална антитерористичка единица
- Common name: Tigers (Macedonian: Тигри)
- Abbreviation: SAU (Macedonian: (САЕ))

Agency overview
- Formed: March 13, 1981

Jurisdictional structure
- Operations jurisdiction: North Macedonia
- Legal jurisdiction: Ministry of Internal Affairs
- Governing body: Government of North Macedonia

Operational structure
- Overseen by: Ministry of Internal Affairs
- Headquarters: Skopje
- Elected officer responsible: Panče Toškovski, Ministry of Internal Affairs
- Parent agency: Government of North Macedonia

Website
- www.mvr.gov.mk

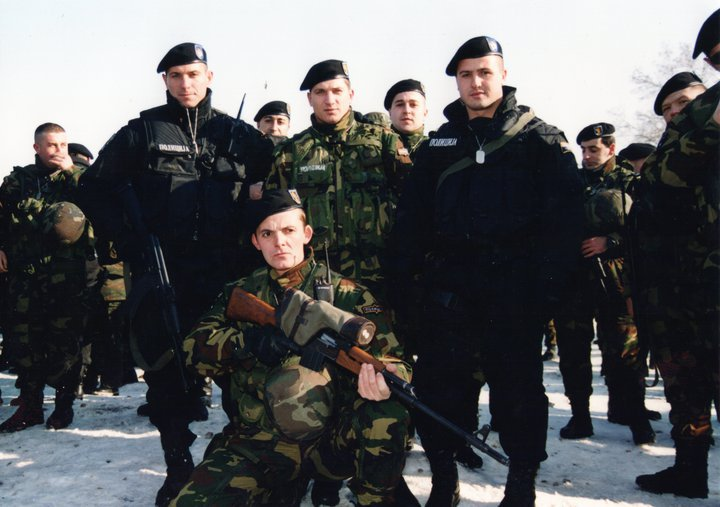
Tigers (in black) and Lions (in green)

The Tigers, officially the Special Anti-Terrorist Unit TIGAR, is a special police unit from North Macedonia.

== History ==
On March 13, 1981, the unit was established in the Socialist Republic of Macedonia (now North Macedonia). The unit was involved in the 2001 insurgency in Macedonia. On March 29, Tigers along with the military units Wolves and Scorpions took over Tanuševci. In the battle of Aračinovo, the Tigers and Wolves failed to stop the rebels' defense line. Tigers defended the water supply during the battle of Raduša. The unit was withdrawn from the battlefield, allegedly due to being sent into battle without adequate support, and refusing to obey orders. During the insurgency, the unit was also involved in the raid and killing of five ethnic Albanian National Liberation Army rebels on August 7 in Skopje.

According to Institute for War and Peace Reporting in 2002, most of the recruits to the Tigers were members of VMRO-DPMNE, with a significant number having criminal records. 14 Tigers got charged for being involved in a fight in Vinica the same year. The unit, along with the unit Lions, was recorded assaulting workers, opposition journalists, media personnel, political activists and random civilians, and also threatening opposition politicians. The unit participated in the 2015 Kumanovo clashes, where eight of its members were killed.

== Notable domestic missions ==
- 2001 insurgency in Macedonia
  - Battle of Aračinovo
  - Battle of Raduša
  - Skopje police raid
- 2007 Operation Mountain Storm
- 2015 Kumanovo clashes

== Foreign missions ==
=== Serbia ===
2014 Floods in Serbia – 24 men and one Mi-17.

=== Bosnia and Herzegovina ===
2014 Floods in Bosnia – 15 men.

== See also ==
- Alpha (Police Unit)
- Special Support Unit
- Rapid Deployment Unit
- Border Police
- Ministry of Internal Affairs
- Police of North Macedonia
- Lake Patrol
