= 2015 Kumanovo clashes =

Series of shootouts in Kumanovo

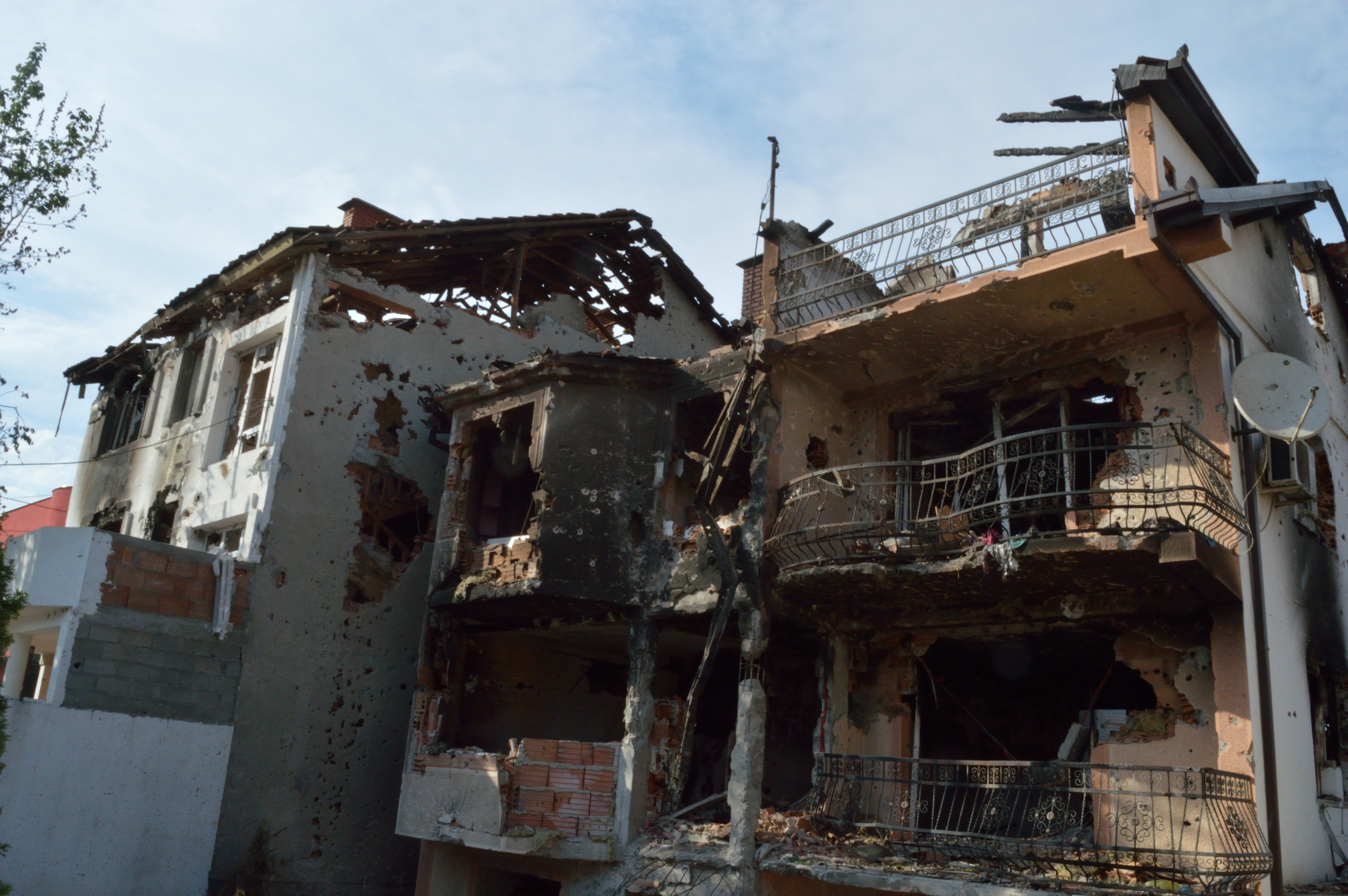
- A house that was heavily damaged in the fighting
Date	9–10 May 2015 (2 days)
Location	Kumanovo, Macedonia 42.1358°N 21.7181°E
Result	Macedonian police victory: Armed group neutralized; Suppression of the armed group by the Macedonian police

Belligerents
Macedonian police	Albanian militant group

Commanders and leaders
Gordana Jankuloska	Mirsad Ndrecaj †; Muhamet Krasniqi (surrendered); Sami Ukshini (surrendered); Beg Rizaj †; Demë Shehu (surrendered)

Units involved
Special Police Unit "Tigers"; Rapid Deployment Unit; Special Support Unit	Unknown

Strength
Unknown	50–70 militants

Casualties and losses
8 killed 37 wounded	14 killed 30–36 arrested
- Location within North Macedonia

A series of shootouts erupted during a raid between the Macedonian police and an armed group identifying itself as the National Liberation Army (NLA). They began on 9 May 2015 in the northern Macedonian town of Kumanovo, and ended the following day on 10 May. During the shootings, 8 Macedonian policemen and 14 of the militants were killed, while 37 officers were wounded and hospitalized. The shooting ended on 10 May 2015, in an operation by the Macedonian police, in which 30 militants were arrested and charged with terrorism-related charges by the Macedonian authorities.

== Background ==
In 2001, there was an armed conflict between Macedonian authorities and the National Liberation Army (NLA), during which Kumanovo Municipality became a battlefield from May until August, when the Ohrid agreement was signed. In 2014, an organization claiming to be concerned with the implementation of the agreement and calling itself NLA claimed responsibility for the government building attack. It occurred parallel to a deep political crisis in the Republic of Macedonia, dating back to the 2014 general elections. The main opposition party, the Social Democratic Union of Macedonia (SDSM), had been making allegations of electoral fraud, denounced the conservative VMRO-DPMNE's party victory and had boycotted the Assembly since. Since early 2015, the Social Democratic leader, Zoran Zaev, came into possession of mass illegal wire-tap recordings allegedly orchestrated by Prime Minister Nikola Gruevski. Zaev started releasing the so-called information "bombs," a series of wire-tapped conversations between the conservative government officials, most of them including Macedonia's Prime Minister Nikola Gruevski. In doing so, he has made allegations that Gruevski has ordered the wire-tapping of some 20,000 Macedonian citizens and having control over the court system in Macedonia.

== Clashes ==
Macedonian media released claims from inhabitants of Zajaz in Kumanovo that they saw around 50 armed men in the early morning. On 9 May, the Macedonian police equipped with armored vehicles and machine guns moved in on Kumanovo to seek an Albanian armed group allegedly planning attacks around the country. The government stated that the armed group numbered 50–70, and the armed men hid in private homes in the Kumanovo neighborhood of Divo Naselje. A shootout between the Macedonian police and the armed group identifying itself as the NLA erupted. The armed group used automatic rifles, sniper rifles, and grenades against the police, and were said by officials to be well-trained. The Macedonian police suffered 3 dead and 12 were wounded in the morning. The inhabitants in the area were evacuated by Macedonian police during the day. Serbia reinforced its border zone. Serbian state news agency Tanjug reported that a large number of Albanians from Kumanovo crossed the border into Serbia.

Around 18:00 CET, the Macedonian media reported that the fighting had stopped, with 27 of the militants having surrendered. However, after most of them surrendered in the evening, there was still sporadic shooting. Macedonian investigators identified the militants as Macedonian and Kosovan nationals, and that they had the intention to attack government institutions and buildings. According to Albanian media, NLA claimed responsibility. By 10 May, the Macedonian police confirmed that the armed group had been neutralized. 8 policemen were killed and 37 policemen were injured. There was also property damage, but no civilians were injured.

== Aftermath ==
The Macedonian authorities stated that the "gunmen were ethnic Albanian terrorists, mostly Macedonian, but led by five Albanians from neighboring Kosovo." The government also described the gunmen as "former rebel commanders from neighboring Kosovo, which broke from Serbia in war in 1999 and inspired an ethnic Albanian insurgency in Macedonia two years later." Gruevski and VMRO-DPMNE presented the incident as a "terrorist attack". The pro-government media also called for the country's unification behind the government and labeled people who disputed the official interpretation of events as traitors. Sami Ukshini, Beg Rizaj, Demë Shehu, Muhamet Krasniqi and Mirsad Ndrecaj were identified as the leaders of the armed group. After the clashes, Macedonian prosecutors charged 30 militants with terrorism. Authorities said that 18 of the suspects were ethnic Albanian illegal immigrants from Kosovo. 10-14 militants were killed in the clashes. On 10 May 2015, the Macedonian President Gjorge Ivanov called an emergency meeting of the country's National Security Council where the leadership of the Macedonian army, police, and political leaders from governing and opposition parties met in the presidential palace to discuss the events. After the meeting, Ivanov stated that "police have prevented coordinated terrorist attacks at different locations in the country that would cause serious destabilization, chaos and fear," adding that the authorities were aware of the armed group's activities since "early 2015." The Macedonian government declared two national days of mourning after the attacks for the police officers that lost their lives during the attack. On 14 May, US Ambassador to the OSCE, Daniel Baer thanked the OSCE Mission to Skopje for its "constructive role in facilitating a ceasefire". Kosovo Police raided several households in Kosovo on 15 May in response to the clashes. On 22 May, Macedonia transferred the bodies of 9 ethnic Albanian gunmen to Kosovo. Veterans' organizations and their families organized their burial in Pristina on 26 May, calling the killed men national heroes.

The group was not supported by the local population or the political parties. The trial against the defendants began in February 2016. The prosecution accused the defendants of being previously involved in an attack on a police station in Gošince. The defendants' lawyers alleged there was police brutality against their clients during their transportation from prison to the court and return. In November 2017, 33 ethnic Albanians were found guilty of terrorism and given prison sentences by the Skopje Criminal Court, while 4 were acquitted. The defendants denied the charges against them, saying they acted in self-defense, while other defendants said they had been victims of a politically motivated set-up. A week after the verdict, family members and relatives of the convicted protested in Skanderbeg Square in Skopje, claiming their innocence. The Kosovo government decided on 10 November to give 219,000 euros in aid to the families of the convicts and those killed during the clashes. Kosovo Liberation Army veterans and their supporters protested against the convictions on 28 November in Pristina. Similar protests were organized in several towns in Kosovo, including Pristina, Gjilan, and Peja. Demonstrators demanded their release while burning the flag of the Republic of Macedonia. The transfer of prisoners to Kosovo has been discussed by the news media but it was not fulfilled. A monument to the killed police officers was revealed in August 2023.

=== Official statements ===
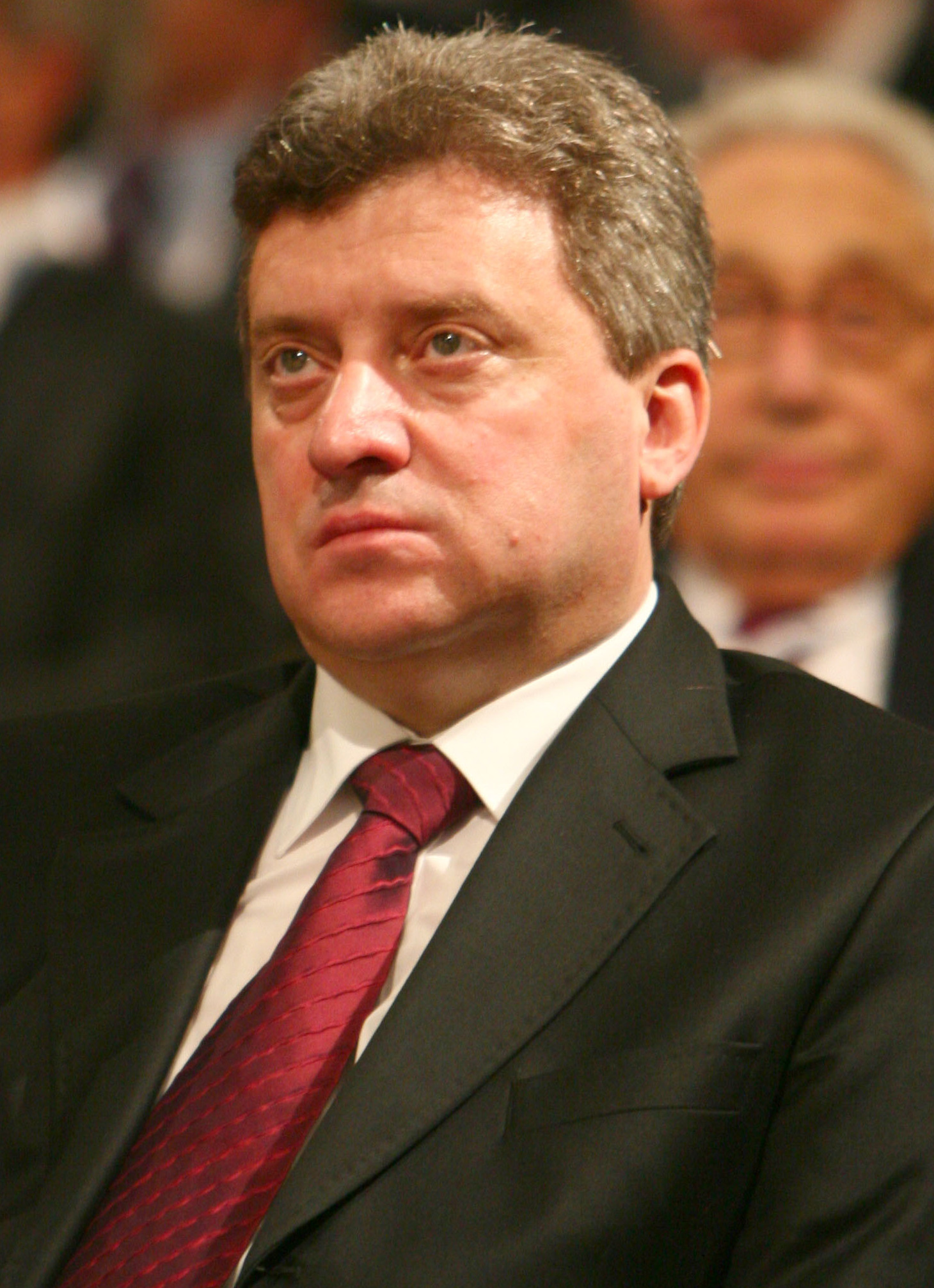
Macedonian President Gjorge Ivanov said the reason for the conflict was due to Macedonia being left "outside of EU integration."

In his speech, the Macedonian Prime Minister Gruevski, praised the police operation calling it a "highly professional, heroic and patriotic action," adding that the "group planned to attack sports events, shopping malls, as well as state-run institutions." He also hailed the eight Macedonian policemen that died during the raid, but also claimed that "their courage may have prevented the killing of some other 8,000 people." Gruevski, during his televised address, said "this is not a Macedonian-Albanian conflict, but a conflict between people who mean no good to the state and people who uphold the state."

President Ivanov said that the Macedonian authorities were aware of the presence of the group within the country since the beginning of 2015. Per him, both EU and NATO members, as well as neighboring countries, were warned about the activities of the group. He also stated that "at the meeting of the National Security Council, which was attended by representatives of the opposition, the attack on the security of the country, whose aim was to destabilise Macedonia, was condemned in the strongest terms," pointing out that "it is high time that those conversations intensified" on the matter of Macedonia joining the European Union and NATO.

=== Allegations ===
The clashes occurred shortly after the release of audio surveillance revealing corruption on a massive scale committed by the leading party in government. Many opposition leaders and political experts claimed the shootout was politically set up to divert the public's attention away from the scandals revolving around the corruption allegations. They also claimed there was evidence that the group was paid 2 million euros to carry out the clashes. Local analysts and international academics have also questioned the government's version of events. Then-leader of the opposition Zoran Zaev stated that "strong indications exist that this is a scenario planned by those in power." VMRO DPMNE strongly denied the claims that it was behind the Kumanovo incident and that it was staged. After he became the prime minister, Zaev declared there would be an international probe. Minister of Interior Oliver Spasovski also said that he would call for an international investigation. However, such an investigation has not been conducted. Regarding the incident, political scientist Florian Bieber wrote: "While the full story of the Kumanovo incident might never come to light, the timing, the confrontation itself, and its background have raised serious doubts about the veracity of the government version of events."

== International reactions ==
- Albania - Albanian Foreign Minister Ditmir Bushati called for an international investigation into the shooting. He stated that the Ohrid Agreement and its implementation represent "the basis for the democratic stability and Euro-Atlantic future of Macedonia" and that "democratic rights in Macedonia should be respected." Albanian Prime Minister Edi Rama also reacted to what had happened in Kumanovo, and while he was attending a ministerial meeting he stated that his country would veto Macedonia's NATO candidacy if it did not respect the rights of its ethnic Albanian minority.
- Bulgaria - Bulgarian prime minister Boyko Borisov, on 13 May 2015, told the country's parliament that he has sent Bulgarian Army troops to the border with Macedonia in order to stop a possible influx of refugees into the country and to prepare to stop potential terrorist attacks.
- European Union - The EU's commissioner for negotiations on enlargement and neighborhood policy, Johannes Hahn, sent three messages about the attacks in Kumanovo, writing "we call on all concerned parties and stakeholders to cooperate in clarifying what happened, who was in charge and who is responsible for it and to act united on this issue." He also stated that he urges "the authorities and all political and community leaders to cooperate, to restore calm and fully investigate the events in an objective and transparent manner within the Law."
- Greece - Greek Foreign Minister Nikos Kotzias met with his Macedonian counterpart Nikola Poposki in Antalya on 13 May, on the side of a NATO Foreign Ministers meeting. He offered Greece's condolences to the families of the victims.
- Kosovo - The Ministry of Foreign Affairs of Kosovo released a statement condemning the violence and called for respect for the Ohrid Agreement of 2001. In a meeting with the Macedonian ambassador to Kosovo, Deputy Minister of Foreign Affairs Petrit Selimi promised that Kosovo would intensify co-operation with Macedonian authorities and agreed to share information on suspected culprits.
- NATO - NATO Secretary General, Jens Stoltenberg, at a press conference at the NATO headquarters in Brussels stated "Macedonian police was ready to handle the situation, but unfortunately with lost [sic]," adding "I urge everyone to exercise restraint and avoid any further escalation, in the interest of the country and the whole region." His official written statement reads that "it is important that all political and community leaders work together to restore calm and conduct a transparent investigation to establish what happened."
- Russia - A statement from the Russian Foreign Ministry stated that it supported the conservative government of Nikola Gruevski, stating that "the eruption of anti-government activities in Macedonia over the last days is worrying," later pointing that "the choice of many opposition movements and NGOs, inspired by the West, that favour the logic of the street and the known scenario of a 'colored revolution', is full of dangerous consequences."
- Serbia - The Serbian President Tomislav Nikolić, sent a letter of condolences for the events in Kumanovo to Macedonia's president, saying he is "deeply distressed at the news about the bloodshed in Kumanovo caused by fanatic terrorist actions." Also, the Serbian prime minister Aleksandar Vučić sent a telegram to Gruevski, stating "on the behalf of the Serbian government and on my personal behalf, I would like to extend sincere condolences to you and the families of the victims." The chief of the Serbian Military Intelligence Agency claimed that he warned Macedonian colleagues about sudden attacks, but Macedonian intelligence officers believed that the statements were over exaggerated.
- Turkey - The Ministry of Foreign Affairs released hopes that the political tensions which have been ongoing in the Republic of Macedonia for a certain period of time would be resolved through democratic means within the principle of rule of law, and dialogue, and the domestic peace and inter-ethnic balance achieved through the Ohrid Framework Agreement in 2001 will not be damaged.

== See also ==
- Operation Mountain Storm
- Timeline of Kumanovo
- 2015 Macedonian protests

== Annotations ==
1. The eight policemen killed were: Boban Ivanovikj (1968, from Stajkovci); Goran Ilijevski (1974, from Gostivar); Goran Stojmenovikj (1970, from Miladinovci); Žarko Kuzmanovski (1981, from Brvenica); Isamedin Osmani (1983, from Studeničani); Ljubiša Arangelovikj (1966, from Skopje); Nenad Serafimovski (1987, from Zubovce); Sašo Samojlovski (1982, from Brvenica).
