= Saracini =

Saracini, Saraçini is a surname. Notable people with the surname include:

- Claudio Saracini (1586–1630), Italian composer, lutenist and singer
- Valon Saraçini (born 1971), Macedonian politician
- Victor Saracini, the captain pilot aboard United Airlines Flight 175, one of the hijacked planes in the September 11 attacks.
