= Police Helicopter Unit of North Macedonia =

Helicopter unit of Macedonian Ministry of Internal Affairs

Agency overview
- Formed: 1969

Jurisdictional structure
- Operations jurisdiction: North Macedonia

Operational structure
- Headquarters: Idrizovo, Skopje, North Macedonia
- Parent agency: Macedonian Ministry of Internal Affairs

Facilities
- Helicopters: 4(2 written off and 1 retired)

The Helicopter unit (Macedonian: Хеликоптерска единица, Helikopterska edinica) is an air support unit of the Macedonian Ministry of Internal Affairs. Its purpose it to provide aerial surveillance, border monitoring, VIP transport, medevac, search and rescue, and aerial firefighting.

== Helicopters ==
=== Current ===
Aircraft	Photo	Origin	Number
Bell 206B-2		United States; Canada	1
Bell AB 212		United States; Canada	1
Bell 412EP		United States; Canada	1
Mil Mi-171		Soviet Union; Russia	1

=== Former ===
- Bell 206A
- MI-17V-5

== See also ==
- Police of North Macedonia
