= Igor Filkov =

Macedonian politician

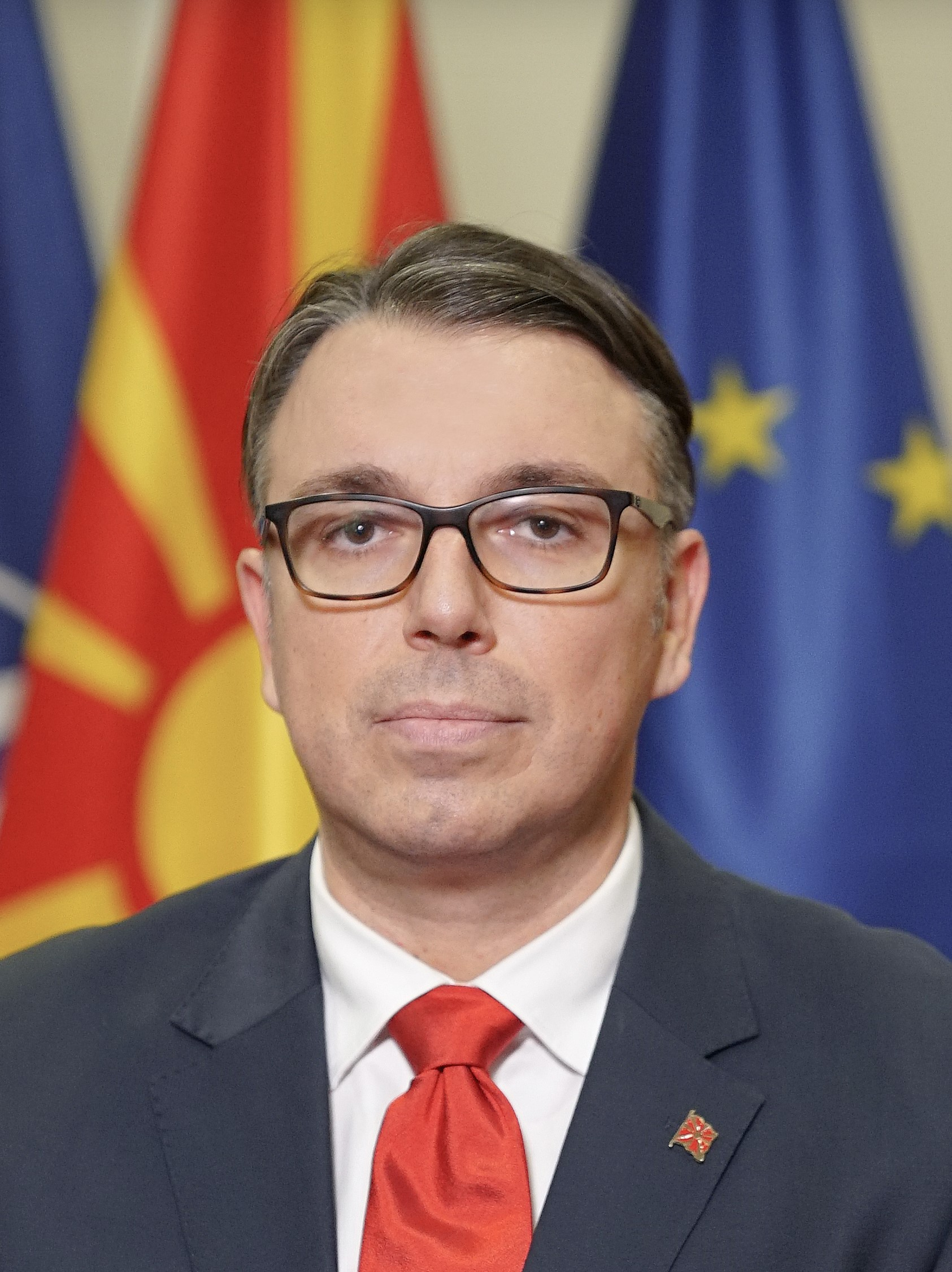
- Filkov in June 2024

Minister of Justice
- Incumbent
- Assumed office 24 June 2024
- Prime Minister: Hristijan Mickoski
- Preceded by: Krenar Loga

Igor Filkov is a Macedonian politician and the incumbent Minister of Justice of North Macedonia.
