= Ambush near Treboš =

Ambush in November 2001

Date	11 November 2001
Location	Near Treboš, Macedonia
Result	See aftermath

Belligerents
Albanian rebels	Macedonia

Commanders and leaders
Unknown	Ljube Boškoski

Units involved
Unknown	Macedonian police Lions

Strength
Unknown	100+ members of the security forces

Casualties and losses
	3 killed 3 wounded
- (North Macedonia) 100 Macedonian civilians abducted and later released 7 Albanians arrested

Albanian rebels ambushed a convoy of the special police unit Lions near the village of Treboš on 11 November 2001. A group known as the Albanian National Army (ANA) claimed responsibility. The ambush occurred after the war of 2001 officially ended with the signing of the Ohrid Framework Agreement when members of the special Macedonian police forces were attacked on the road to Treboš where they were supposed to secure a mass grave, suspected of containing the bodies of 13 Macedonian civilians kidnapped by the NLA.

== Ambush ==
In November, there were media allegations that 13 Macedonian men who were previously reported as abducted by rebels had been executed and buried in one or more mass graves near the village of Treboš. On 11 November, the Macedonian interior minister Ljube Boškoski ordered the special police unit Lions to secure an alleged mass grave of Macedonian civilians in the area of Tetovo. There they arrested seven Albanians whom they accused of belonging to the NLA. In reaction, ethnic Albanian villagers retrieved automatic weapons which were withheld and set up checkpoints, vowing to resist Boškoski's forces. In an e-mail to a Western news agency, ANA declared: "We declare all territories with majority Albanian populations... a forbidden zone for the forces of repressive Macedonian machinery. If they enter, they will be deemed legitimate targets and get hit without warning." 100 Macedonian civilians were abducted by Albanian rebels in retaliation. A convoy of the Lions was ambushed by Albanian rebels near Treboš, which resulted in the deaths of three policemen and the wounding of another three.

== Aftermath ==
ANA claimed responsibility for the attack. It also claimed that Xhemail Rexhepi (Shqiponja 5 [Eagle 5]) was involved in the clashes. A former NLA commander denied involvement of the disbanded organization with the abductions. International mediators and NATO troops convinced the Albanians to free the hostages. Police units were withdrawn from Treboš. President Boris Trajkovski's cabinet distanced itself from the arrest of the seven Albanians, conceding it had violated the amnesty for the rebels. Pavle Trajanov, leader of the party Democratic Alliance, blamed Boškoski for the ambush. Western envoys also blamed him for provoking the violence before the vote in parliament to ratify the Ohrid Framework Agreement. On 22 November, the human remains thought to be of six Macedonian civilians were found in the area.
