= Nuhiu =

Nuhiu is an Albanian surname. Notable people with the surname include:

- Agim Nuhiu (born 1977), Macedonian politician
- Ardian Nuhiu (born 1978), Macedonian footballer
- Atdhe Nuhiu (born 1989), Kosovo footballer
