= Special Support Unit =

Special Support Unit Посебна Единица за Поддршка
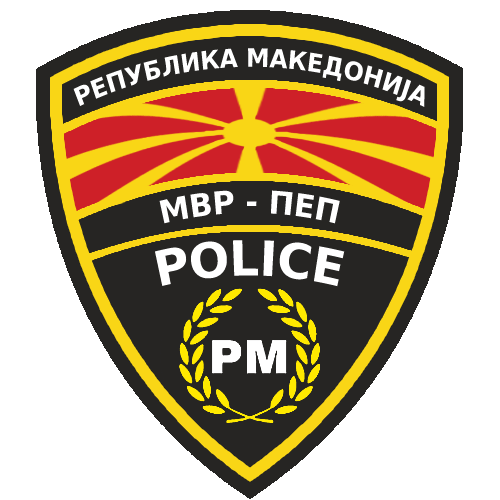
- Patch of Rapid Deployment Unit
- Abbreviation: SSU (Macedonian: (ПЕП))

Agency overview
- Formed: June 5, 1989
- Employees: 115

Jurisdictional structure
- Operations jurisdiction: North Macedonia
- Legal jurisdiction: Ministry of Internal Affairs
- Governing body: Government of North Macedonia

Operational structure
- Overseen by: Ministry of Internal Affairs
- Headquarters: Skopje
- Elected officer responsible: Oliver Spasovski, Ministry of Internal Affairs
- Parent agency: Government of North Macedonia

Website
- www.mvr.gov.mk

Special Support Unit (SSU) is a paramilitary police unit of the Police of North Macedonia, Ministry of Internal Affairs in the Republic of North Macedonia.

The Special Support Unit is made up of regular paramilitary police officers who, when necessary, support other units like the Alpha, Rapid Deployment Unit (EBR), Special Operations Unit (aka Tigers), etc.

Physical fitness is a requirement for SSU, more so than for other police officers. They don't have a base; instead, they work as regular police officers in the stations, wearing camouflage as necessary. They are more trained than regular paramilitary police officers, but not as well as Alpha, Rapid Deployment Unit, and Special Operations Unit. SSU members are physically fitter than ordinary police officers, which is the fundamental distinction between the SSU and the police. When their service is complete, a significant portion of the members from Alpha, Rapid Deployment Unit, and Special Operations Unit transfer to this unit.

Although the SSU is not as well trained as main paramilitary polices units like the Alpha, Rapid Deployment Unit, and Special Operations Unit which spearhead about commando style raids on key targets, counterinsurgency, executive protection, high-risk tactical law enforcement situations, operating in difficult to access terrain, providing security in areas at risk of attack or terrorism, special reconnaissance, support crowd control and riot control, and tactical counterterrorism missions, but they are trained to be capable of combat with small unit tactics to against dangerous criminals and irregular military in urban and hard-to-reach areas.

== Notable domestic missions ==
2015 Kumanovo shootings

== See also ==
Special Operations Unit - Tigers
Lions (police unit)
Alpha (Police Unit)
Border Police
Rapid Deployment Unit
Ministry of Internal Affairs
Police of North Macedonia
Lake Patrol
