= Alpha (Police Unit) =

Alpha (Macedonian: Алфа)
- Abbreviation: UFRI (Macedonian: (ЕПОИ))

Jurisdictional structure
- Operations jurisdiction: North Macedonia
- Legal jurisdiction: Ministry of Internal Affairs
- Governing body: Government of North Macedonia

Operational structure
- Overseen by: Ministry of Internal Affairs
- Headquarters: Skopje
- Elected officer responsible: Oliver Spasovski, Ministry of Internal Affairs
- Parent agency: Government of North Macedonia

Website
- www.mvr.gov.mk

Unit for First Response and Intervention - Alpha, commonly referred to as the Alphas or Alfas, was a plain-clothes police and emergency first response unit in North Macedonia. They often received a reputation for mistreatment of prisoners. They were disbanded in 2020.

== History ==
The Alphas were a plain clothed unit of the Macedonian police. Due to several reports of police brutality mentioned in a report from the Council of Europe on FYR Macedonia, the Macedonian Ministry of Interior announced that they were temporarily disbanding all Alpha units except the one based in the capital Skopje in 2008. They also announced that during re-run elections during the 2008 Macedonian parliamentary election, they announced that only uniformed police would be deployed to polling stations. In a 2009 follow-up review, the Council of Europe's Committee for the Prevention of Torture noted that the disbanding of the majority of the Alpha units in FYR Macedonia led to a significantly reduced number of police mistreatment complaints.

In 2014, the Skopje Alpha unit was granted a status by the government of FYR Macedonia as a separate unit to the police for first response purposes within the city boundaries. In 2016, the Alpha unit conducted an unannounced training exercise outside the Embassy of the United States, Skopje which put the embassy into lockdown given they were informed "this is not a drill" and they had not been informed. The captain in charge of the Alphas was reprimanded after a meeting between the police and the embassy. In 2020, the North Macedonian Ministry of Internal Affairs announced that the Alpha units were to be disbanded and replaced with a new Intervention Unit based upon the Croatian Police's equivalent first response unit. The former Alphas commander Primislav Dimovski was appointed as the head of the replacement unit.

== See also ==
Special Operations Unit - Tigers
Border Police of North Macedonia
Lions (police unit)
Special Support Unit
Ministry of Internal Affairs
Police of North Macedonia
Lake Patrol
