= Vejce =

Vejce Вејце Vicë
- Village
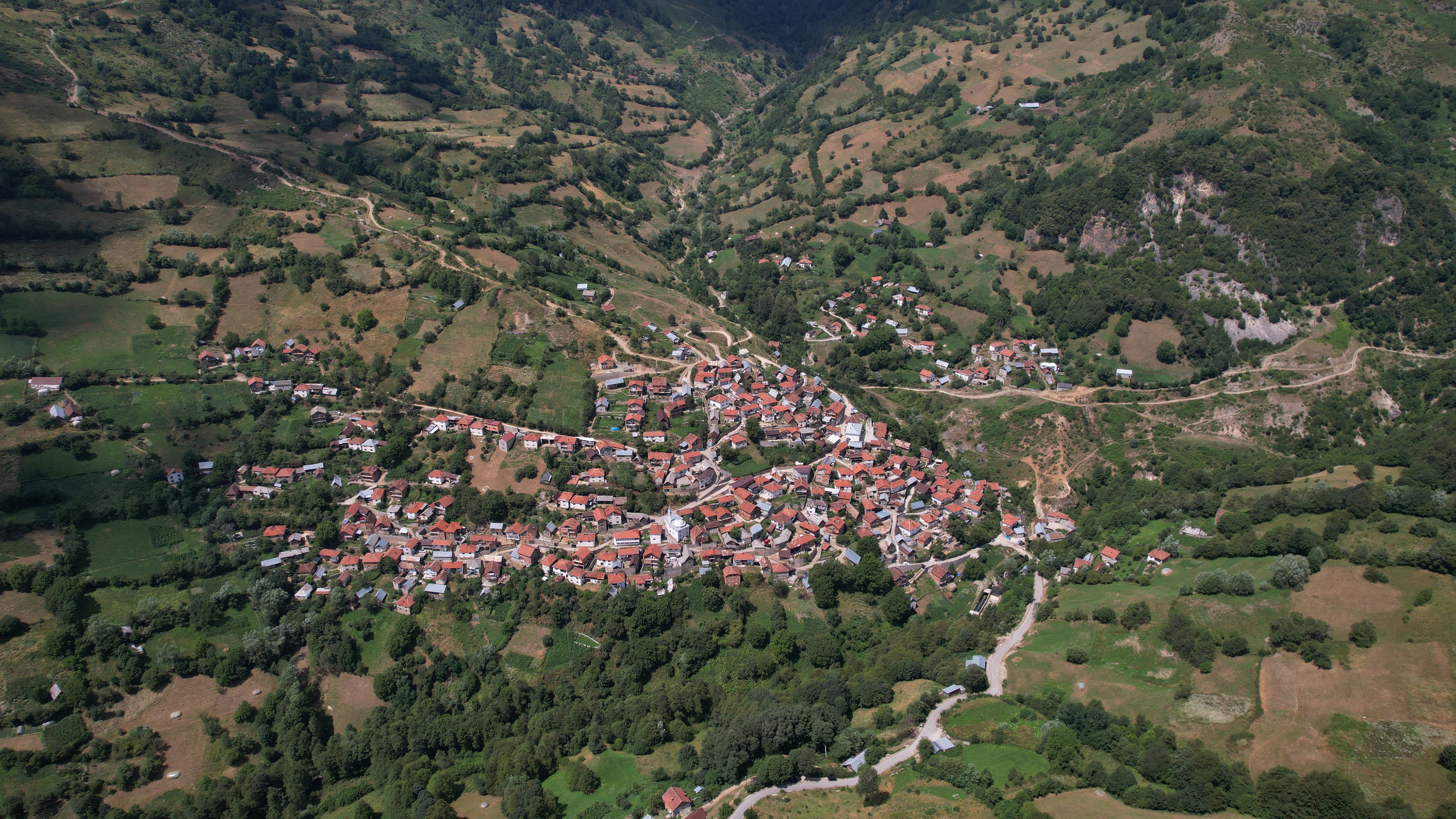
- Air view of the village

- Location within North Macedonia
- Coordinates: 42°04′N 20°51′E
- Country: North Macedonia
- Region: Polog
- Municipality: Tetovo

Population (2021)
  - Total: 848
  - Density: 0.50/km^{2} (1.3/sq mi)
- Time zone: UTC+1 (CET)
  - Summer (DST): UTC+2 (CEST)
- Car plates: TE
- Website: .

Vejce (Macedonian: Вејце, Albanian: Vicë) is a village in the municipality of Tetovo, North Macedonia. It is a small village located in the Šar Mountains, some 9.01 kilometres away from the closest city Tetovo and 1250 metres above sea level.

== History ==
Vejce is attested in the 1467/68 Ottoman tax registry (defter) for the Nahiyah of Kalkandelen. The village had a total of 70 Christian households, 2 bachelors and 5 widows.

According to the 1467-68 Ottoman defter, Vejce exhibits largelly Slavic Orthodox anthroponomy with a smaller presence of Albanian ones.

During the insurgency in the Republic of Macedonia, on the way between Selce and Vejce, rebels of the paramilitary Albanian National Liberation Army ambushed the Macedonian armed forces, which resulted in the deaths of eight members.

== Demographics ==
According to the 2021 census, the village had a total of 848 inhabitants. Ethnic groups in the village include:

- Albanians 804
- Macedonians 2
- Others 42

Year	Macedonian	Albanian	Turks	Romani	Vlachs	Serbs	Bosniaks	Others	Total
2002	1	1.114	...	...	...	...	...	12	1.127
2021	2	804	...	...	...	...	...	42	848

According to the 1942 Albanian census, Vejce was inhabited by 518 Muslim Albanians.
