= Electoral units of North Macedonia =

North Macedonia is divided into six electoral units, from which votes for the members of parliament are processed.

From each unit, 20 members are chosen for a seat in the 120-member Assembly. These 20 members are chosen based on the proportion of votes given to a particular party; the more votes a party receives, the more seats in parliament it occupies.

== See also ==
- Politics of North Macedonia
