= Dime Spasov =

Macedonian politician

- Spasov (in the middle)

Ministry of Labor and Social Policy of the Republic of Macedonia
- In office 29 May 2013 – 11 November 2015
- Prime Minister: Nikola Gruevski

Personal details
- Born: 7 May 1985 (age 41) Skopje, SR Macedonia; SFR Yugoslavia (now Macedonia)
- Party: VMRO-DPMNE
- Education: University of Skopje

Dime Spasov (born 7 May 1985 in Skopje) is a Macedonian politician, the former Minister of Labor and Social Policy of the Republic of Macedonia in the government of Nikola Gruevski. He is member of the party VMRO-DPMNE.
