= Ministry of Justice (North Macedonia) =

Government ministry of North Macedonia

The Ministry of Justice is a ministry of the Government of the Republic of North Macedonia, which is in charge of prosecuting government cases and the administration of institutions falling within the scope of the judiciary system (courts, prisons, etc.).

== List of ministers ==
No.	Portrait	Name (born-died)	Mandate commenced on	Mandate finished on	Length (in days)	Party/Coalition	Government
1		Gjorgji Naumov (b. 1949)	20 March 1991	5 September 1992	535	Independent	1
2		Tuše Gošev (b. 1951)	5 September 1992	20 December 1994	836	Independent	2
3		Vlado Popovski (b. 1941)	20 December 1994	29 May 1997	891	Independent	3
4		Gjorgji Spasov (b. 1949)	29 May 1997	30 November 1998	550	Independent	3
5		Vlado Kambovski (b. 1948)	30 November 1998	28 December 1999	393	DA	4
6		Xhevdet Nasufi (b. 1948)	28 December 1999	May 2001	?	PDSH	4
7		Ixhet Memeti (b. 1961)	May 2001	1 November 2002	?	Independent	4
8		Ismail Darlishta (b. 1964)	1 November 2002	2 June 2004	579	BDI	5
(7)		Ixhet Memeti (b. 1961) (2nd mandate)	2 June 2004	17 December 2004	198	Independent	5
9		Meri M.-Gjorgjievska (b. 1969)[1st female]	17 December 2004	27 August 2006	618	?	5
10		Mihajlo Manevski (b. 1937)	27 August 2006	28 July 2011	1796	VMRO-DPMNE	6, 7
11		Blerim Bexheti (b. 1976)	28 July 2011	19 June 2014	1057	BDI	8
12		Adnan Jashari (b. 1965)	19 June 2014	16 January 2016	576	BDI	9
13		Valdet Xhaferi (born 1989)	16 January 2016	1 June 2017	502	DUI	10
14		Bilen Saliu (born 1975)	1 June 2017	4 June 2018	368	DSU	11
15		Renata Deskoska (born 1972)	4 June 2018	30 August 2020	818	SDSM	11, 12
16		Bojan Maričić (born 1983)	30 August 2020	16 January 2022	504	SDSM	13
17		Nikola Tupančeski (born 1961)	16 January 2022	...			

== See also ==
- Justice ministry
- Politics of the Republic of Macedonia
