= Treboš =

Treboš Требош Trebosh
- Village
- Location within North Macedonia
- Coordinates: 42°01′N 21°02′E
- Country: North Macedonia
- Region: Polog
- Municipality: Želino

Population (2002)
  - Total: 2,388
- Time zone: UTC+1 (CET)
  - Summer (DST): UTC+2 (CEST)
- Car plates: TE
- Website: .

Treboš (Macedonian: Требош, Albanian: Trebosh) is a village in the municipality of Želino, North Macedonia.

== History ==
Treboš is attested in the 1467/68 Ottoman tax registry (defter) for the Nahiyah of Kalkandelen. The village had a total of 33 Christian households, 2 bachelors and 3 widows.

According to the 1467-68 Ottoman defter, Treboš exhibits largely Slavic Orthodox population with a presence of Vlach ones.

== Demographics ==
According to the 2002 census, the village had a total of 2388 inhabitants. Ethnic groups in the village include:

- Albanians 2372
- Macedonians 7
- Serbs 1
- Others 8

According to the 1942 Albanian census, Treboš was inhabited by 87 Muslim Albanians, 60 Bulgarians and 55 Serbs.
