= Selce, Tetovo =

Selce Селце Sellcë
- Village
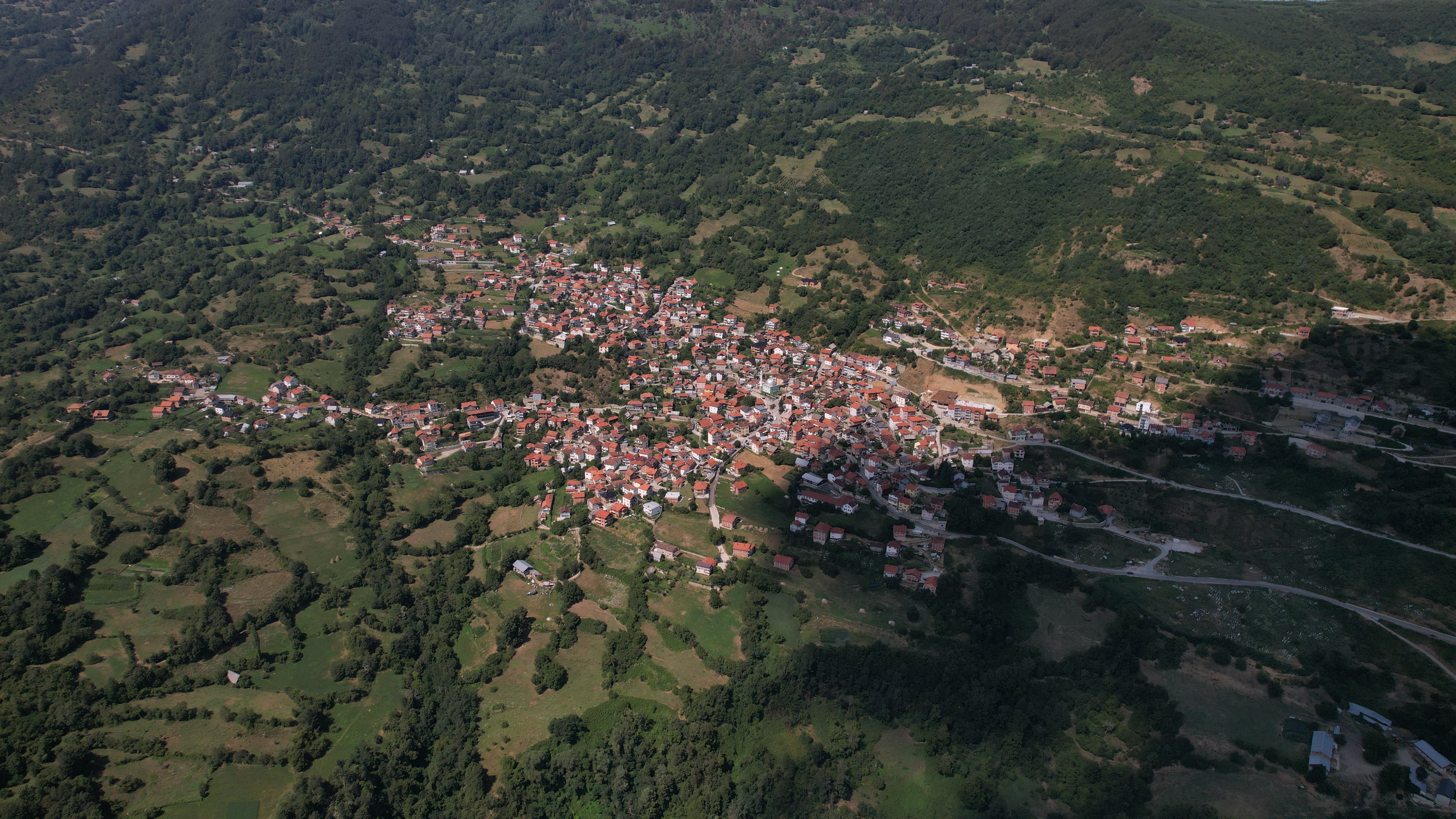
- Air view of the village

- Location within North Macedonia
- Coordinates: 42°02′04″N 20°56′22″E
- Country: North Macedonia
- Region: Polog
- Municipality: Tetovo

Population (2021)
  - Total: 2.239
- Time zone: UTC+1 (CET)
  - Summer (DST): UTC+2 (CEST)
- Car plates: TE
- Website: .

Selce (Macedonian: Селце, Albanian: Sellcë) is a village in the municipality of Tetovo, North Macedonia.

== History ==
Selce is attested in the 1467/68 Ottoman tax registry (defter) for the Nahiyah of Kalkandelen. The village had a total of 47 Christian households and 2 bachelors.

According to the 1467-68 Ottoman defter, the inhabitants of Selce exhibit Orthodox Christian Slavic anthroponyms.

== Demographics ==
According to the 2021 census, the village had a total of 2.239 inhabitants. Ethnic groups in the village include:

- Albanians 2.149
- Others 90

Year	Macedonian	Albanian	Turks	Romani	Vlachs	Serbs	Bosniaks	Others	Total
2002	...	2.521	...	...	...	...	...	...	2.521
2021	...	2.149	...	...	...	...	...	90	2.239

According to the 1942 Albanian census, Selce was inhabited by 712 Muslim Albanians. In statistics gathered by Vasil Kanchov in 1900, the village of Selce was inhabited by 500 Muslim Albanians.
