= Panče Toškovski =

Macedonian politician

- Панче Тошковски
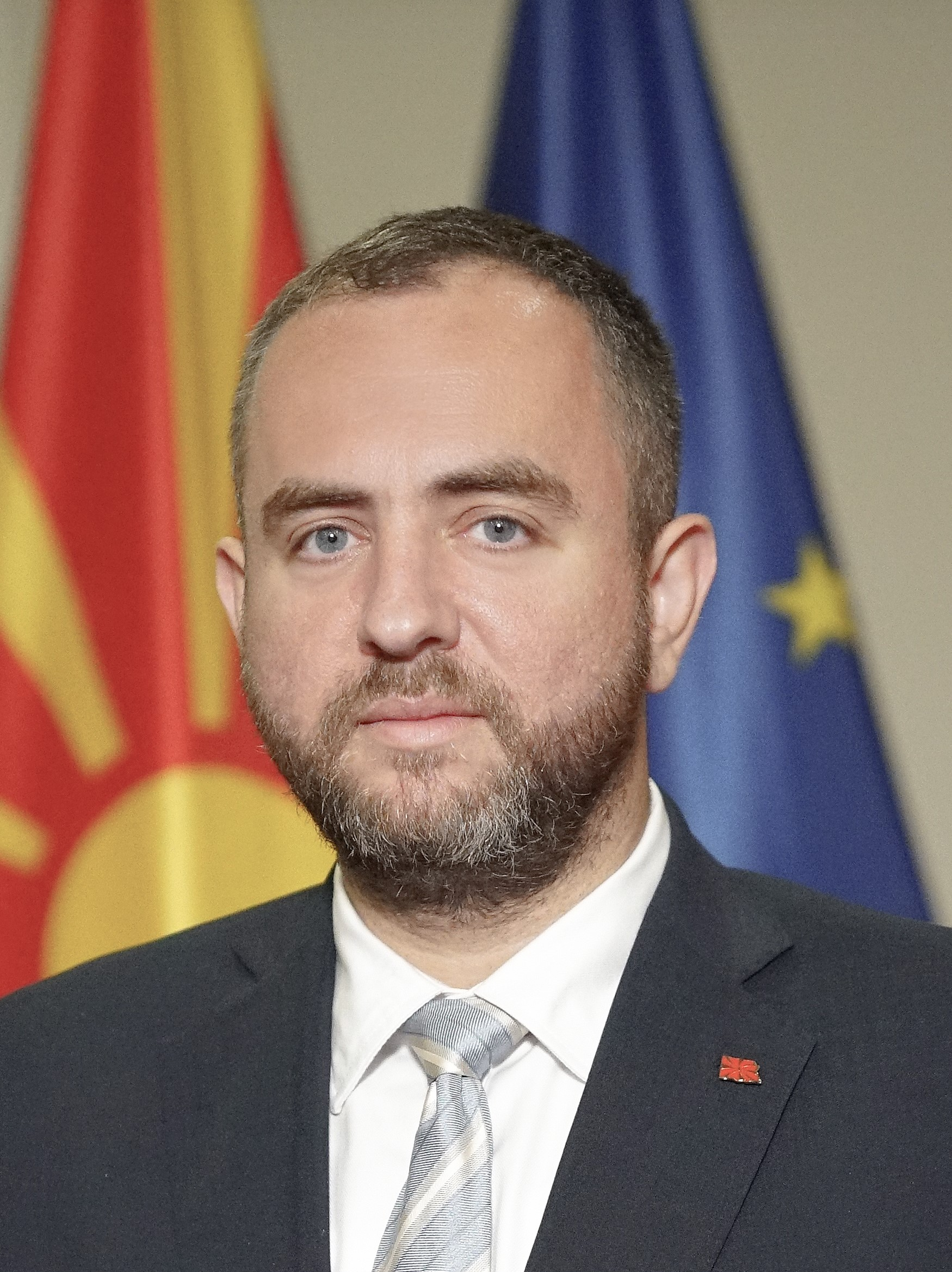
- Official portrait in 2024

Minister of Internal Affairs
- Incumbent
- Assumed office 29 January 2024
- Prime Minister: Talat Xhaferi; Hristijan Mickoski
- Preceded by: Oliver Spasovski

Personal details
- Party: VMRO-DPMNE

Panče Toškovski (Note: Macedonian: Панче Тошковски, pronounced ['pant͡ʃe 'tɔʃkɔfski]) is a Macedonian politician. He has held the office of Minister of Internal Affairs since 29 January 2024 succeeding Oliver Spasovski.

== Biography ==
Pance Toshkovski, born on June 14, 1982, in Skopje, served as a member of the Expert Team of the Government of the Republic of North Macedonia in 2008. From October 2008 to October 2011, he worked as an advisor, and from October 2011 until 2024, he practiced law. On January 28, 2024, he was appointed Minister of Internal Affairs in the Technical Government led by Talat Xhaferi as a representative of VMRO-DPMNE. He officially took office as Minister of Internal Affairs in Hristijan Mickovski’s Cabinet on June 23, 2024.

== Personal life ==
Toškovski tested positive for COVID-19 on 19 August 2024.

Political offices
Preceded by Oliver Spasovski	Minister of Internal Affairs; 29 January 2024 – Present	Succeeded by Incumbent
