= Agim Nuhiu =

Macedonian politician (born 1977)

Agim Nuhiu JD

Minister of Internal Affairs
- In office 29 December 2016 – 1 June 2017
- President: Gjorge Ivanov
- Prime Minister: Emil Dimitriev
- Preceded by: Oliver Spasovski
- Succeeded by: Oliver Spasovski

Associate Dean of Law Faculty SUT
- In office 2015–2016
- Succeeded by: Ferat Polisi

Personal details
- Born: Agim Nuhiu; 24 August 1977 (age 48) Slatino, Tetovo, SFR Yugoslavia (now North Macedonia)
- Party: Democratic Union for Integration
- Children: 2
- Occupation: Politician, Associate Dean
- Ethnicity: Albanian
- Alma Mater: University of Tirana; State University of Tetovo
- Languages: Albanian (native), Macedonian, English

Agim Nuhiu (born 1977) was Interior Minister of Macedonia. He was the first ethnic Albanian from Macedonia to hold this position in the government since Macedonia's independence from Yugoslavia in 1991. He was Deputy Minister in the Ministry of Internal Affairs for 4 years. On September 24, 2020, Agim Nuhiu became Deputy Minister of Justice in the Republic of North Macedonia.

Political offices
Preceded by Oliver Spasovski	Minister of Internal Affairs; 2016–2017	Succeeded by Oliver Spasovski
