= Lions (police unit) =

Police unit (2001–2003)

Unit for Rapid Intervention "Lions" Единица за брза интервенција "Лавови"
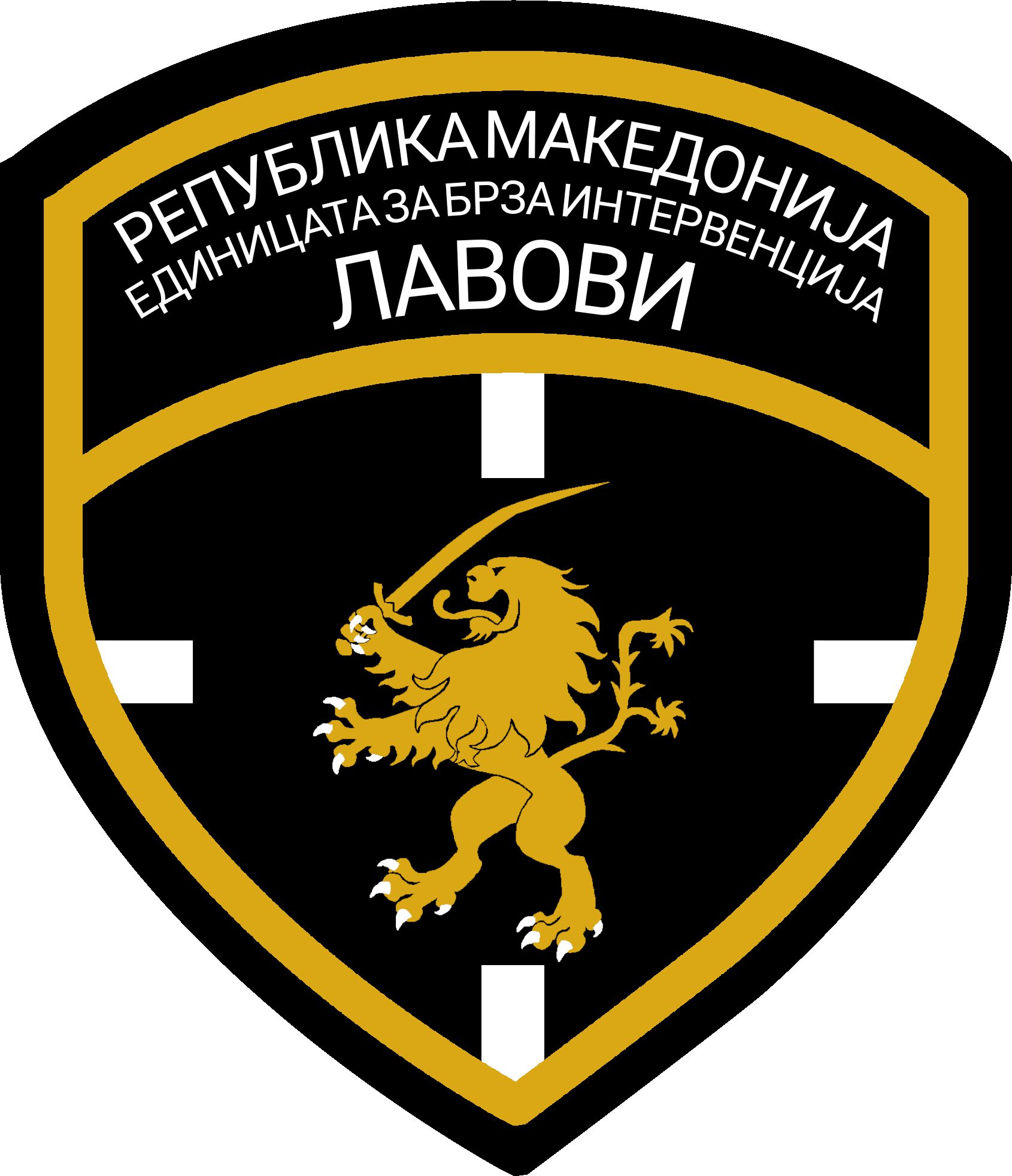

Agency overview
- Formed: 2001
- Dissolved: 2003

Jurisdictional structure
- National agency: Republic of Macedonia
- Operations jurisdiction: Republic of Macedonia
- Governing body: Republic of Macedonia

Operational structure
- Overseen by: Ministry of Internal Affairs
- Headquarters: Skopje
- Elected minister responsible: Ljube Boškoski
- Agency executive: Goran Stojkov, general

The Lions was a special police unit for fast interventions formed by the Macedonian interior minister Ljube Boškoski in 2001. It was dissolved in 2003.

== History ==
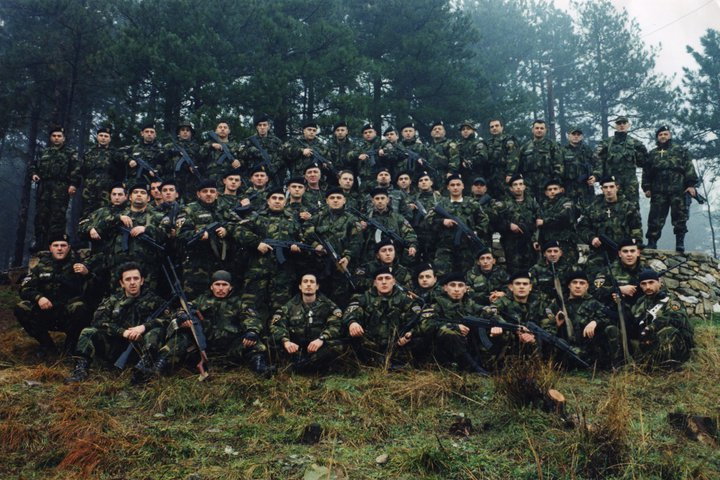
Company of the unit in July 2001 near Kumanovo

The unit was formed in mid-2001 by the then-interior minister Ljube Boškoski during the insurgency in Macedonia. He named the unit after the hotel he owned in Croatia and his brand of wine. It was an unauthorized entity of former police and military reservists. Most were also members of VMRO-DPMNE and some had criminal records. It also functioned as a VMRO-DPMNE-based paramilitary. Its personnel were all ethnic Macedonians but they had minimal contact with Albanians and were mostly used to provide security for Macedonian villages. After the conflict, it was transformed into an official police unit. The unit went to secure mass graves in the Tetovo area in November but it was ambushed and three members were killed by Albanians. In December, an Albanian farmer was killed by the police near Šemševo, with the Lions being the main suspects. The Lions displayed shows of force in Albanian areas in January 2002 and during the election campaign in September 2002. They actively threatened ethnic cleansing against Albanians. The unit, along with the unit Tigers, was recorded assaulting workers, opposition journalists, media personnel, political activists and random civilians, and also threatening opposition politicians. In 2002, four members of the unit were involved in the killing of six Pakistani citizens and one Indian citizen, who were claimed to be terrorists. They were charged with murder but were acquitted in 2005.

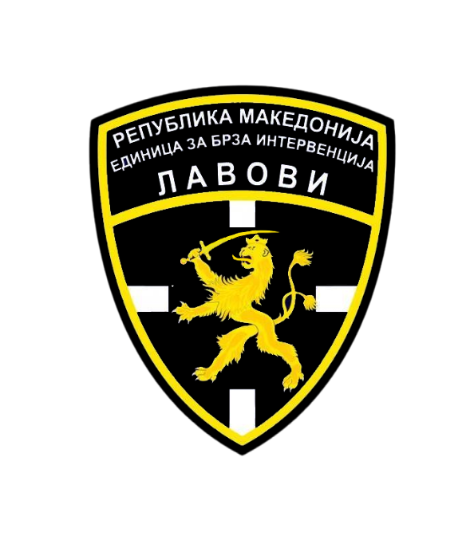
Lions patch 2001-2003

In January 2002, members of the unit received medallions of Christ from the head of the Macedonian Orthodox Church, Stefan, which was criticized by human rights activists, Albanian political leaders and opposition political parties. In that ceremony, the commander of the unit, Goran Stojkov, was promoted to the rank of major general. Amnesty International reported that two citizens were allegedly severely beaten and threatened with guns and knives by members of the unit near Struga on 3 April 2002. The unit opposed the inclusion of former Albanian insurgents in the coalition government. Мembers of the unit and the Macedonian police had a standoff on 23-24 January 2003, blocking the main Skopje-Pristina road at the border crossing of Blace. The Lions ended their blockade after an agreement was reached between the unit, President Boris Trajkovski and Prime Minister Branko Crvenkovski. It was agreed to disband the unit with most of its members joining the regular police and army. EU and NATO had also applied strong pressure on the Macedonian government to disband the unit. The unit was disbanded in the same year. According to official data from Macedonian police, Lions' members had been involved in more than 70 criminal acts including weapons offenses, pub brawls, murders and assaults on civilians.

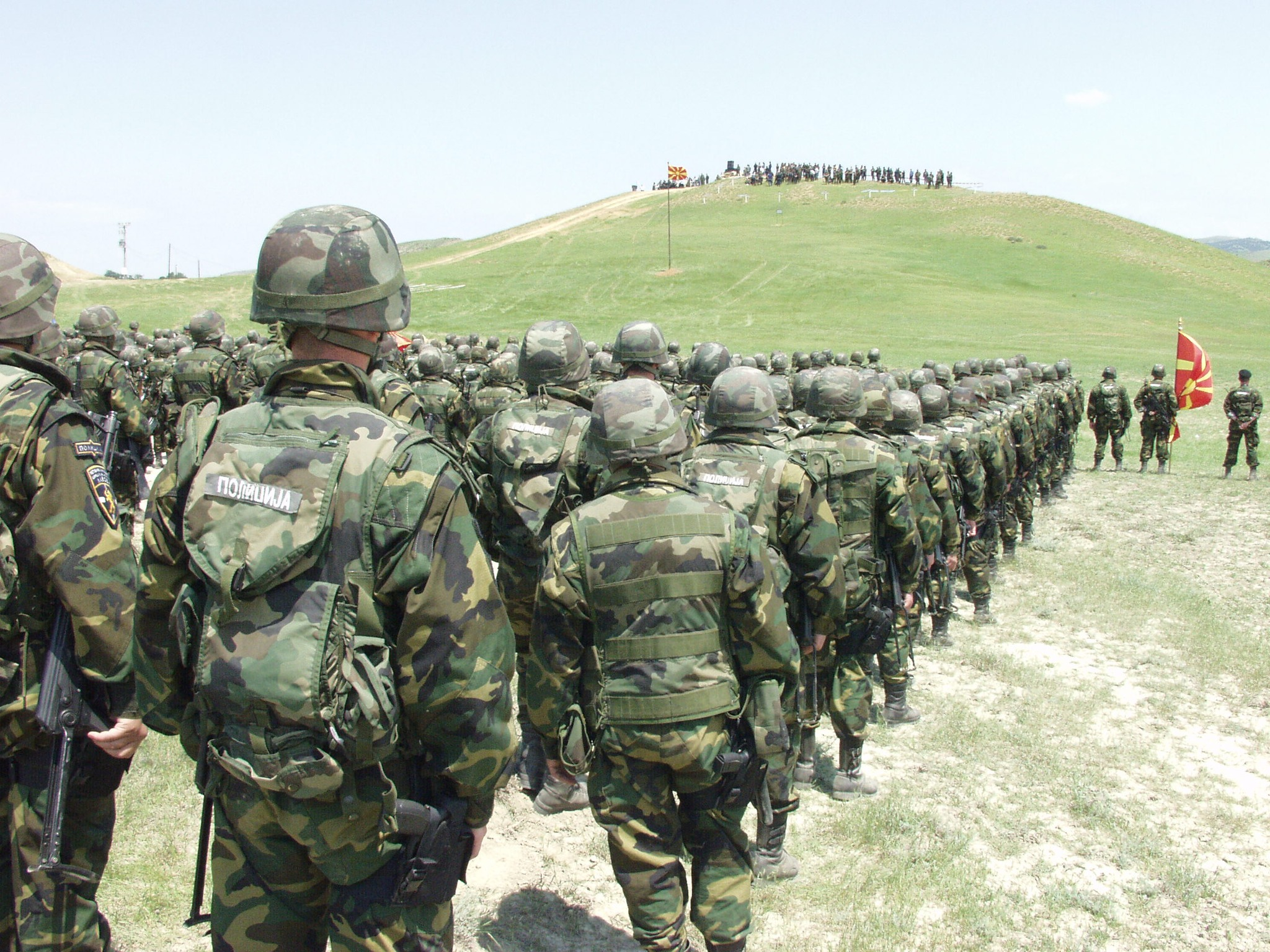
Lions at staging ground 2002

== Notable members ==
- Toni Mihajlovski, spokesman

== See also ==
- Ambush near Treboš
- Border Police
- Alpha
- Special Support Unit
- Lake Patrol

== Equipment ==
Personal Equipment

- M91 Eurokompozit Helmet
- BE-02 Ballistic Vest
- Mile Dragić Vest
- Woodland Camouflage (Often a locally made copy) (an Urban Variant can also be seen in later years)
- Tiger Stripe (Yugoslav Tiger-stripe Patterns )
- Zastava M70
- AR-M1 (Bought From Bulgaria)
- Zastava M92
- PKM (Bought from Ukraine)
- RPG-7 (Bought from Ukraine)
- Zastava M84
- Zastava M76
- Zastava CZ99

Motor-Pool

- Mercedes-Benz Unimog
- TAM-5000
- TAM 110
- Puch G
- DAF YA-4440

Armoured Personnel Carriers (APCs)

- TM-170
- BTR 80
- BTR 70
- MT-LB
