= Valon Saraçini =

Politician from North Macedonia

Valon Saraqini

Minister of Economy of the Republic of Macedonia
- In office July 2011 – June 2014

Personal details
- Born: 24 July 1981 (age 44) Skopje, Socialist Republic of Macedonia, SFR Yugoslavia
- Political party: Democratic Union for Integration

Valon Saraçini (Macedonian: Ваљон Сараќини, romanized: Valjon Sarakjini, born 24 July 1981) is a Macedonian politician of Albanian descent. He served as the Minister of Economy of Macedonia, today known as North Macedonia. He took the office of a Minister of Economy in July 2011, setting as priorities in his mandate the improvement of the business climate, increasing competitiveness of Macedonian economy, development of an efficient and stable energy system, planned and sustainable utilization of mineral resources and development of tourism.

== Political career ==
=== Minister of Economy ===
Proponent for economic integration of the region, with the aim of increased investments, strengthened economic cooperation, joint approach on third markets and creation of regional tourism packages that would meet the requirements of the world tourist. At his initiative are intensified the activities in the field of mineral resources and the procedure for awarding concessions for exploration and exploitation are accelerated. Support of entrepreneurship and small and medium-sized enterprises is implemented through numerous activities and program measures, and for the first time are stimulated the women’s entrepreneurship and crafts, as special segments of entrepreneurship. Communication with business entities and its associations is continuous with meetings, working meetings, visits of business capacities and participation at public debates. As a representative of the Democratic Union for Integration, which on July 1, 2008 made coalition with VMRO-DPMNE, Minister Saraqini implemented a series of activities and investment projects directed to the places where mostly Albanians live, especially in Western Macedonia. Beside the procedure for finding a strategic investor-concessionaire of the TIDZ Tetovo, a series of investments were implemented in projects in the energy field, especially in the part of concessions for small hydro-power plants and activities for improving energy efficiency in schools and kindergartens. In the field of tourism, the Ohrid-Struga coast was put on the map of the tour operators, especially the Benelux countries, but also Turkey, eastern countries and the Balkans, and also intensified the activities for modernization of the winter center Popova Shapka. A series of measures wer implemented to improving the business climate, which had a special influence on mitigating the consequences of the global economic crisis, and as a result of some of the implemented activities Republic of Macedonia, according to Doing Business 2012, is ranked on the sixth place in the world and the first in Europe for the speed of registration of a company. Namely, registration of trading company takes 40 hours and costs about 30 EUR, due to which it may be said that RM has the fastest, cheapest and most efficient/easiest registration in Europe and one of the best in the world.

=== International activities ===
In direction of promoting regional cooperation Minister Saraqini had visits and meetings with the Minister of Economy of Republic of Albania, Насип Начо, the Deputy Prime minister and Minister of Trade of Republic of Kosovo Mimoza Kusari Lila and Minister of Economy of Republic of Kosovo, Besim Beqaj, the Minister of Economy of Republic of Turkey, Zafer Caglayan, Minister of Economy of Republic of Serbia Nebosja Kirik, Minister of Economy of Republic of Bulgaria, Trajco Traykov. Saraqini was head of the delegation at the first meeting of the Joint Committee for the Free Trade Agreement between Macedonia and Kosovo, as well as of a business delegation of about 50 business entities, at the Kosovo-Macedonian Business Forum in Pristine and as member of the Government delegation, he participated at the Investment Forum in Great Britain, within the Road Show that was held in London and the Road Show held in Republic of Turkey. He realized meeting with a high ranking delegation from PR China, which came to an official visit to Republic of Macedonia, at which were presented the possibilities for promotion and extension of the economic cooperation, as well as a meeting the Mexican telecommunication magnate Carlos Slim, as member of the Government team, during his visit to Republic of Macedonia, and within the Chairing role of Slim at the meeting of the Broad bend and Digital Development Commission in Ohrid. Among the other, Saraqini participated at the Ninth Meeting of the Ministerial Council of the Energy Community, which was held in Republic of Moldova, country that holds the presidency of the Energy Community in the course of 2011, at the Central European Initiative (CEI) Summit, which was held within the Serbian presidency with CEI, at the 5th Session of the CEFTA Joint Committee, presided by Republic of Kosovo, the Ministerial Conference of Southeast Europe countries, organized by OECD, the Government of Slovenia and the Regional Cooperation Council, titled “Vision of the SEE countries 2020”, at the informal Competitiveness Council on the invitation of the Danish Minister for Business and Development Ole Son, the Tourism Forum in Ukraine and the first Regional Summit organized by the Macedonian Transmission System Operator (MEPSO) in Skopje.

== Professional experience ==
At the position of a Minister, Valon Saraqini came from a private high educational institution – University American College Skopje. As communication director at this university, Saraqini was responsible for preparation of a complete marketing strategy, public relations and marketing campaign of UAKS, initiating and realization of activities related to the Business Council and the Alumni Club, in accordance to the needs of the business community and UAKS, as well as communication with business groups, governmental agencies and NGOs. His three-year experience as an operational director in American College University –Skopje contributed in development of his managerial skills, in this case at the university and coordination of different departments, planning and defining a budget and implementing plans, establishment of working processes and policies that assist in performing the activities related to the university, defining, measurement, evaluation and improving the quality of services, which would certainly contribute to successful management of the departments in the Ministry. The beginning of his professional experience date back in 2002, as administrative officer in the Norwegian Refugee Council –Skopje, where he worked on planning and realization of activities in the scope of functioning of this non-governmental organization and continuous communication with the public.
