= Police of North Macedonia =

Law enforcement agency

Police of North Macedonia Полиција на Северна Македонија (Macedonian)

Agency overview
- Formed: 1992

Jurisdictional structure
- National agency: North Macedonia
- Operations jurisdiction: North Macedonia
- Primary governing body: Government of North Macedonia
- Secondary governing body: Ministry of Internal Affairs
- General nature: Civilian police

Operational structure
- Headquarters: Skopje
- Minister responsible: Pancho Toshkovski, Ministry of Internal Affairs
- Agency executive: Magdalena Nestorovska, State Secretary of the MIA
- Parent agency: Government of North Macedonia
- Child agency: ANB

Facilities
- Stations: Skopje, Kumanovo, Shtip, Strumica, Bitola, Ohrid, and Tetovo
- Light vehicles: Chevrolet Spark 100
- Scoters: Sym HD2 200i, Piaggio Beverly 300
- Helicopters: agusta AB206B-2 (1), agusta ab212 (1), bell 412ep (1), mil Mi-171 (1), mil Mi-17V-5 (1)
- Dogs: German Shepherd

Notables
- Anniversary: May 7th
- Award: (Hungary) Constantinus 2013 Silver Medal

Website
- www.mvr.gov.mk

Law enforcement in North Macedonia is the responsibility of the Police of the Republic of North Macedonia (Macedonian: Полиција на Република Северна Македонија, romanized: Policija na Republika Severna Makedonija).

The police headquarters are located in Skopje at the Ministry of Internal Affairs, and also maintain an air base in nearby Idrizovo. Taiwan, Canada, and Italy have all contributed Bell Helicopter Textron helicopters to the police force's Macedonian Police Aviation Unit in cooperation with the Air Force of North Macedonia to help combat insurgencies the country.

The law enforcement agencies of North Macedonia are regulated by the Constitution of 1991, the Law on Internal Affairs of 1995, the Criminal Procedure Code of 1997 and the Draft Law on Changes and Additions to the Criminal Procedure Code. With police actions and behavior controlled by the Criminal Procedure Code, and the Law on Internal Affairs controlling the use of firearms by the police force. On July 1, 2003, the Law on the Police Academy was enacted, creating a police academy to train civil and border police officers.

The force has been the subject of a number of recent reforms regarding both the Albanian insurgency, and possible violations of human rights, with NATO officials stating that the force was "not really up to European standards" as policemen lacked in skills and weapons.

== History ==
The Police were subject to scrutiny during Albanian riots on 9 July 1997 when protesters collected in the western town of Gostivar. Over 200 were wounded and three killed (two shot, one beaten to death) in a resulting clash with police riot squads, and the Humans Rights Watch investigated allegations of police brutality. These events underlined a continuing friction between the Macedonian Police force and Albanians living in North Macedonia. The International Helsinki Federation for Human Rights reported that police abuse of suspects, particularly during initial arrest and detention, and police harassment of ethnic minorities is ongoing.

The Police of North Macedonia work closely with the NATO peacekeepers in patrolling areas with high numbers of ethnic Albanians ever since the 2001 Macedonia conflict ended, and have been receiving weapons from surrendering Albanian insurgents. Violent attacks, however, still occur as in 2001 three officers were killed by Albanian gunmen.

A notable incident was when the Macedonian Police arrested a Horse in 2009 used by a crime smuggling ring to smuggle air conditioners from Serbia. At that time the Police were not sure whether to press charges or not, but ultimately decided to not press charges against the Horse.

On the 2nd of December, 2022, during a routine traffic stop, а driver was asked to show his documents, to which the driver didn't comply and proceeded to call an armed group. Said group proceeded to chase the police officers out of Aračinovo and into the Gazi Baba police station.

== Organization ==
- Border Police
- Lake Patrol Police
- Traffic Police
- Helicopter unit

=== Special Police ===
- Special Operations Unit - Tigers
- Rapid Deployment Unit
- Special Support Unit
- Unit for First Response and Intervention - Alpha

==== Former special police unit ====
- Lions police tactical unit

== Equipment ==
=== Vehicles ===
Vehicle	Photo	Origin	Users	Use	Notes
Light Vehicles
Peugeot 408		France	Regular and Traffic Police	Patrolling and Transport	This vehicle has been in use since the end of 2025. mvr.gov.mk. Equipped with TETRA
Dacia Duster		Romania	Forest and Border Police	Patrolling and Transport	Due to a lack of Vehicles, the Police of North Macedonia has begun using Border Police vehicles as regular Police vehicles.
Land Rover Defender 110		United Kingdom	Regular, Special and Border Police	Patrolling, Transport and Surveillance	The Border Police uses a modified Land Rover fitted with Cameras designed to monitor certain areas to prevent illegal crossings etc.
Škoda Octavia		Czech Republic	Regular and Traffic Police	Patrolling and Transport	
Dacia Sandero		Romania	Traffic Police	Patrolling and Transport	Ten in Service.
Škoda Yeti		Czech Republic	Regular and Traffic Police	Patrolling and Transport	The vehicle is used by all police offices, stations, departments in North Macedonia and is its most recognizable vehicle. There is another version of the vehicle that is used as a lead vehicle in traffic and escort security (CEO) of VIPs, officials etc. The only difference in appearance are the police lights which appear in blue and red instead of the usual blue.
BMW (E46)		Germany	Regular and Traffic Police	Patrolling and Transport	Limited use by certain departments.
Volkswagen Transporter		Germany	Regular and Special Police	Patrolling and Transport	The vehicle used by the regular police, unlike the original, is fitted with a high roof. This van, without markings and without an upgraded roof, is also used by the special police. In 2014, a project for mobile police stations was promoted in the area of Skopje and this van was chosen to be the main vehicle used in this project.
Ssangyong Rexton		South Korea	Border Police	Patrolling and Transport	Due to a lack of Vehicles, the Police of North Macedonia has begun using Border Police vehicles as regular Police vehicles.
Dacia Dokker		Romania; France	Patrolling and Transport		
Helicopters
Bell 206B-2		United States; Canada	Helicopter Unit	Patrolling and Transport	One in service.
Bell AB 212		United States; Canada	Helicopter Unit	Patrolling and Transport	One in service.
Bell 412EP		United States; Canada	Helicopter Unit	Patrolling and Transport	One in service.
Mil Mi-171		Soviet Union; Russia	Helicopter Unit	Patrolling and Transport	One in service (other one was slightly damaged in 2020 and was later written off).
Mil Mi-17V-5		Soviet Union; Russia	Helicopter Unit	Patrolling and Transport	None in service (1 retired and 1 written off in an accident in 2014).
Motorcycles
Honda ST1300 Pan-European		Japan	Traffic Police	CEO Transport	Used by the Department for Vanguard, Traffic and Escort Security (CEO) in its activities, including the escort of VIPs, officials, etc.
Sanyang SYM HD2 200i		Taiwan	Traffic Police	CEO Transport	Used by the Department for Vanguard, Traffic and Escort Security (CEO) in its activities, including the escort of VIPs, officials, etc.
Piaggio Beverly		Italy	Traffic Police	CEO Transport	120cc version is used.
Armored Vehicles
TM-170		Germany	Special Police	Transport	Known as the "Hermelin" (Stoat/Ermine in English). Used by the Special Operations Unit and the Rapid Deployment Unit.
BTR-80		Soviet Union; Russia	Special Police	Transport	Used by the Special Operations Unit and the Rapid Deployment Unit.
Wolf Armoured Vehicle		Israel	Special Police	Transport	Used by the Special Operations Unit and the Rapid Deployment Unit.
TOMA		Turkey	Special Police	Unknown	

=== Former Vehicles ===
Vehicle	Photo	Origin	Users	Use	Notes
Chrysler Cirrus		United States	Regular Police	Patrolling and Transport	210 were purchased in 2000 and used into the 2010s, averaging more than 500,000 kilometres (310,000 mi) traveled each.
Lada Niva		Soviet Union	Regular Police	Patrolling and Transport	
Mercedes-Benz W124		Germany	Regular Police	Patrolling and Transport	
Volkswagen Polo Mk3		Germany	Regular Police	Patrolling and Transport	

=== Dogs ===
Breed	Photo	Origin	Users	Notes
German Shepherd		Germany	K9 Unit	

=== Small Arms ===
Name	Photo	Type	Origin	Notes
Pistols
Zastava CZ 99		Pistol	Yugoslavia; Serbia	9×19mm Standard issued pistol of the police.
Glock17		Pistol	Austria	9x19mm Used by the Special Operations Unit.
Submachine guns
H&K MP5		Submachine gun	Germany	9×19mm Used by the Special Operations Unit.
Assault Rifles
Zastava M70		Assault rifle	Yugoslavia; North Macedonia; Serbia	7.62×39mm Used for special situations such as armed conflict, but can also be used daily by police station guards.
AR-M1		Assault rifle	Bulgaria	7.62×39mm and 5.56×45mm Used by the Rapid Deployment Unit.
IWI Tavor		Bullpup Assault Rifle	Israel	5.56×45mm Used by the Rapid Deployment Unit.
IWI Tavor X95		Bullpup Assault Rifle	Israel	5.56×45mm Used by the Special Operations Unit.
Zastava M92		Assault rifle	Yugoslavia; Serbia	7.62×39mm Used by the Rapid Deployment Unit.
Sniper Rifles
Zastava M76		Sniper rifle	Yugoslavia; Serbia	7.92×57mm Used by the Rapid Deployment Unit.
Zastava M93		Sniper rifle	Serbia	12.7×108mm Used by the Rapid Deployment Unit.
Sako TRG-42		Sniper rifle	Finland	12.7×57mm Used by the Rapid Deployment Unit.
McMillan TAC-50		Sniper rifle	United States	.50 BMG Used by the Rapid Deployment Unit.
AI-AXMC		Sniper rifle	United Kingdom	7.62×51mm, .338 Lapua Magnum and .300 Winchester Magnum Used by the Special Operations Unit.
SVD Dragunov		Sniper rifle	Soviet Union; Russia	7.62×54mm Used by the Rapid Deployment Unit.
Machine guns
PKM		Machine gun	Soviet Union; Russia	7.62×54mm Used by the Rapid Deployment Unit.
Zastava M84		Machine gun	Yugoslavia; Serbia	7.62×54mm Used by the Rapid Deployment Unit.
IWI Negev		Machine gun	Israel	5.56×45mm Used by the Special Operations Unit.

== Gallery ==
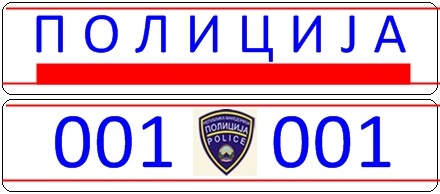
Pre-2019 licence plates of the Macedonian Police

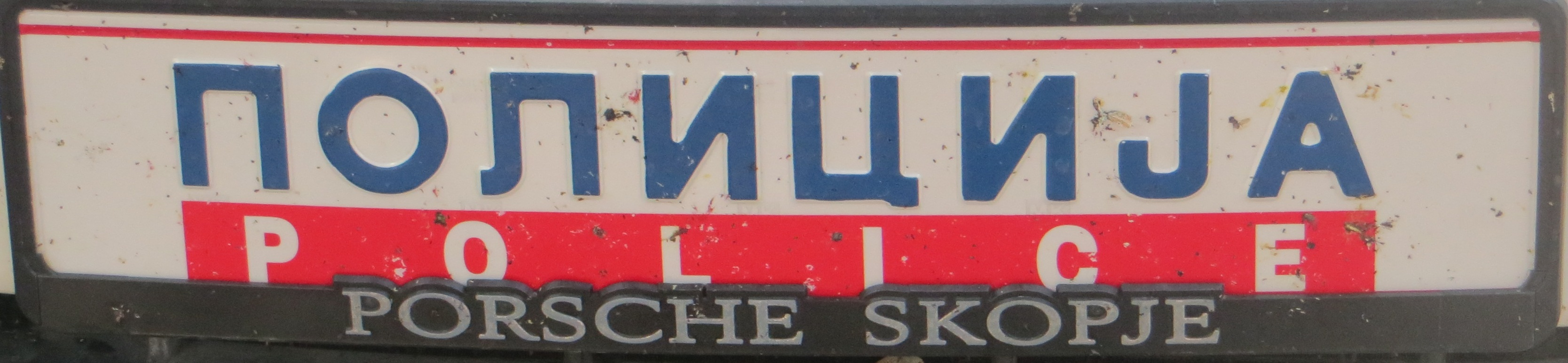
License plate on the front of Macedonian Police vehicles

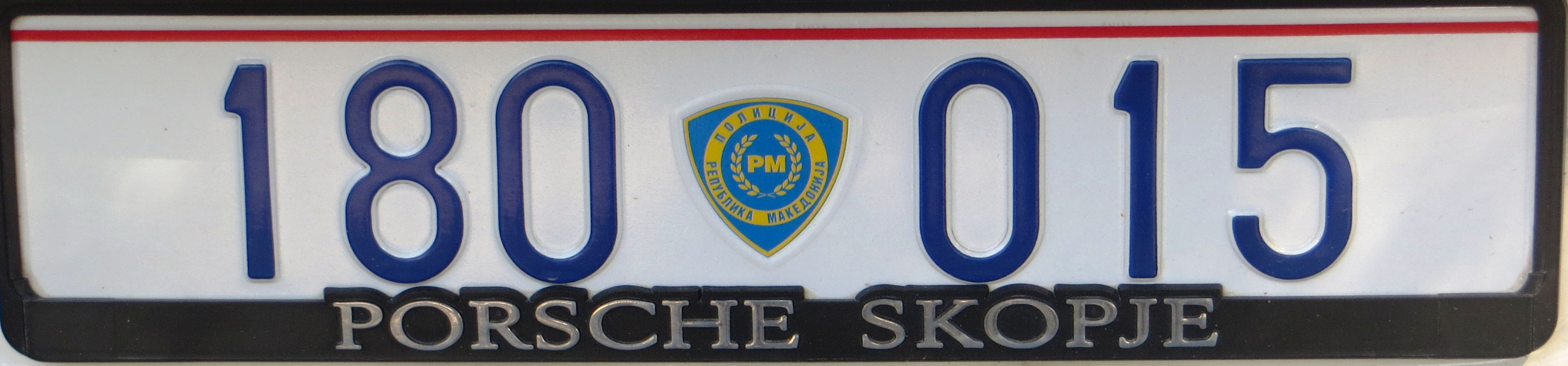
License plate on the back of Macedonian Police vehicles

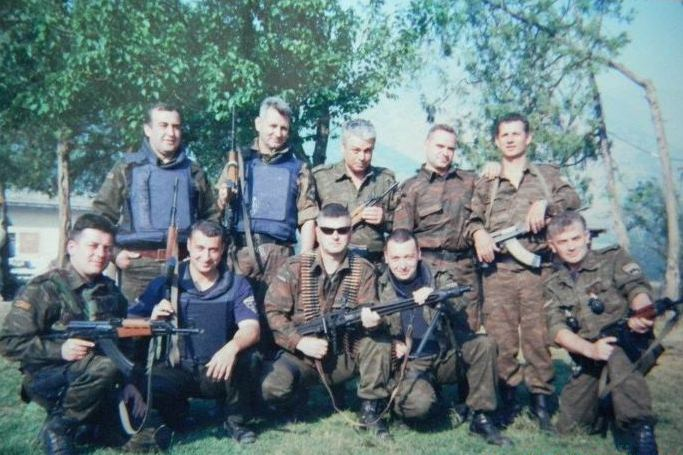
Police in v. Radusha in 2001

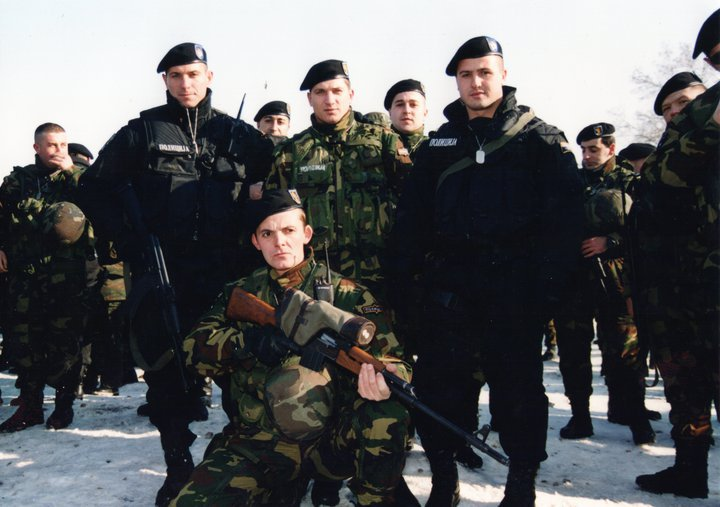
Special units Tigers and Lions in 2001

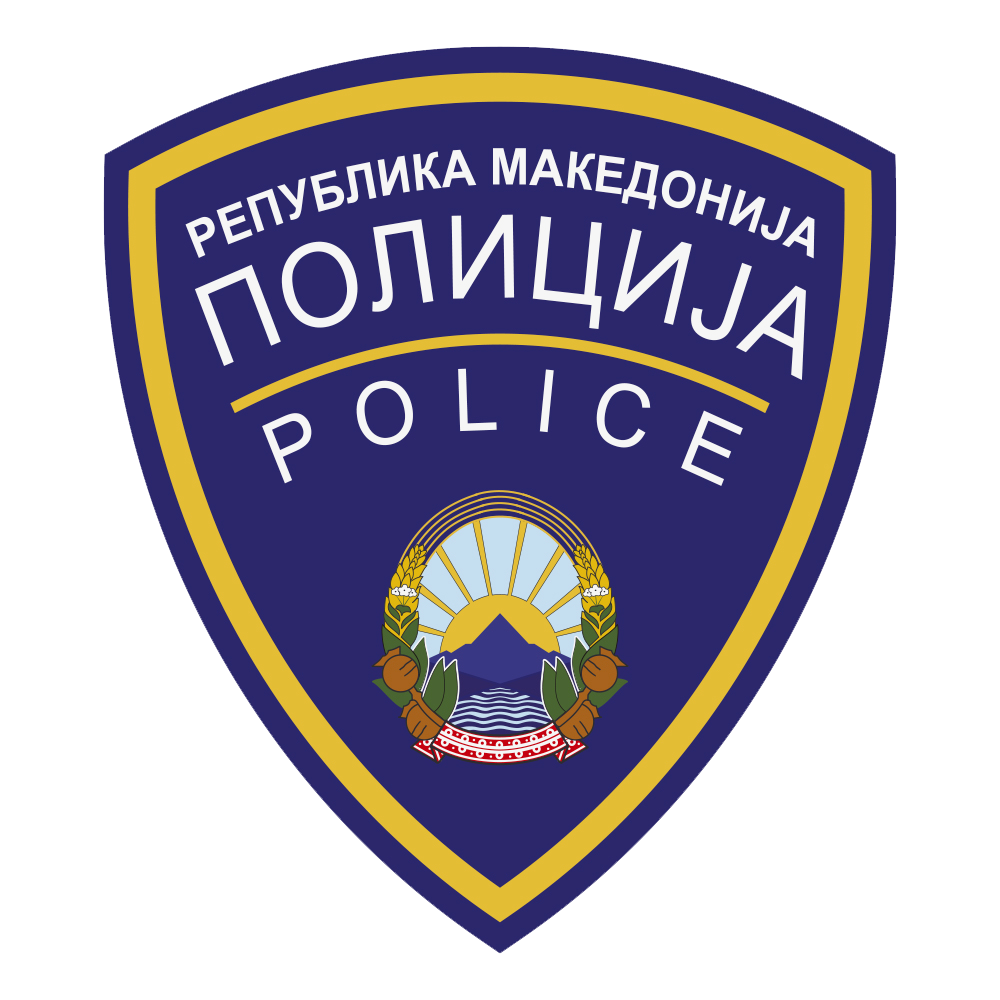
Pre-2019 Coat of arms of the Macedonian Police

== See also ==
- Intelligence Agency Domestic intelligence agency
- Administration for Security and Counterintelligence Foreign intelligence agency

Military Service for Security and Intelligence-G2 Military intelligence agency
