= Mitko Čavkov =

Macedonian politician

Mitko Čavkov Митко Чавков

Minister of Internal Affairs
- In office 13 May 2015 – 31 August 2016
- President: Gjorge Ivanov
- Prime Minister: Nikola Gruevski
- Preceded by: Gordana Jankuloska
- Succeeded by: Oliver Spasovski

Director of Bureau of Public Safety of Macedonia
- In office September 2016 – November 2017

Personal details
- Born: Mitko Čavkov; 24 January 1963 (age 63) Novo Selo, FPR Yugoslavia
- Party: VMRO-DPMNE
- Occupation: Politician

Mitko Čavkov (Macedonian: Митко Чавков, pronounced ['mitkɔ 't͡ʃafkɔf]; born 24 January 1963) is a former Interior Minister of Macedonia. He was appointed minister after the mini cabinet reconstruction of the Macedonian Government by the Prime Minister Nikola Gruevski. On September the first 2016, in line with the Przino Agreement he resigned and was appointed Director of Bureau of Public Safety of Macedonia.

Political offices
| Preceded by Gordana Jankuloska | Minister of Internal Affairs; 13 May 2015 – 31 August 2016 | Succeeded by Oliver Spasovski |
