= 2014 Macedonian government building attack =

Albanian militant attack on the Macedonian government building

Coordinates: 42°0′2.36″N 21°25′42.2″E

On the night of 28 October 2014 at around 22:00, the Macedonian government building was attacked with two projectiles, damaging the walls and roof of the building. No casualties were reported. Speculations have occurred that the event was linked to the then recent proclamation of the so-called Republic of Ilirida. The government building was also attacked by RPG rounds in 2007. A movement calling itself the National Liberation Army (NLA), the same name of a militant organization that fought against the Macedonian government during the 2001 insurgency in Macedonia, claimed responsibly for the attack. In a press release published by Alsat, and signed by Commander Kushtrim, the organization claimed that the Hasan Prishtina elite force hit the government building in a coordinated action. The organization claims it is "discontented" with the 2001 Ohrid Agreement peace plan, and the following year clashes would erupt in the city of Kumanovo between a group identifying as the NLA and Macedonian security forces.
