= Border Police of North Macedonia =

Specialist police unit

Border Police Гранична Полиција (Macedonian)
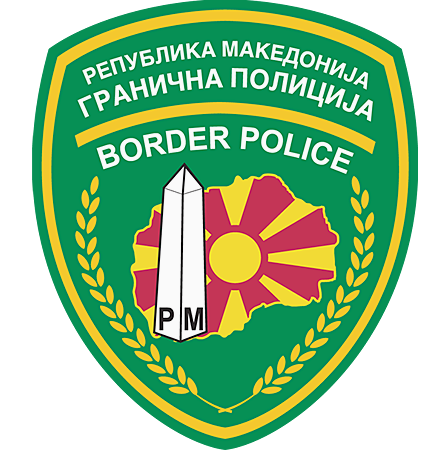
- Patch of Border Police

Agency overview
- Formed: May 7, 2004

Jurisdictional structure
- Operations jurisdiction: North Macedonia
- Governing body: North Macedonia
- Specialist jurisdiction: National border patrol, security, integrity

Operational structure
- Overseen by: Ministry of Internal Affairs
- Headquarters: Skopje
- Elected minister responsible: Panche Toshkovski

Website
- mvr.gov.mk

The Border Police (Macedonian: Гранична полиција, Granična policija) is a legal police unit that monitors and protects the borders of North Macedonia. It faced off against 40 armed men on 21 April 2015 with NLA patches. 4 policemen were captured, but were later released.

== Vehicles ==
- 1 Bus Mercedes
- 2 Minibuses Mercedes Sprinter
- 23 Cross-motorcycles Husqvarna
- 17 Ford Focus
- 8 Ford Transit
- 62 Jeeps Land Rover Defender
- 2 Jeeps Land Rover Freelander

== Attacks ==
40 armed men on 21 April 2015 showed up with National Liberation Army (NLA) patches and attacked a border police station located at Gošince, near the Kosovo border. Before they left for Kosovo, they issued this message through an interpreter: "We are from the National Liberation Army. Tell them that neither Ali Ahmeti nor Nikola Gruevski can save you. We do not want any framework agreement and if we see you here again, we will kill you. We want our own state."

== See also ==
- Ministry of Internal Affairs
- Police of North Macedonia
- Lake Patrol
- Army of North Macedonia
- Lions former
- Special Operations Unit - Tigers
- Alpha (Police Unit)
- Special Support Unit
