= Gordana Jankuloska =

Macedonian politician

- Гордана Јанкулоска
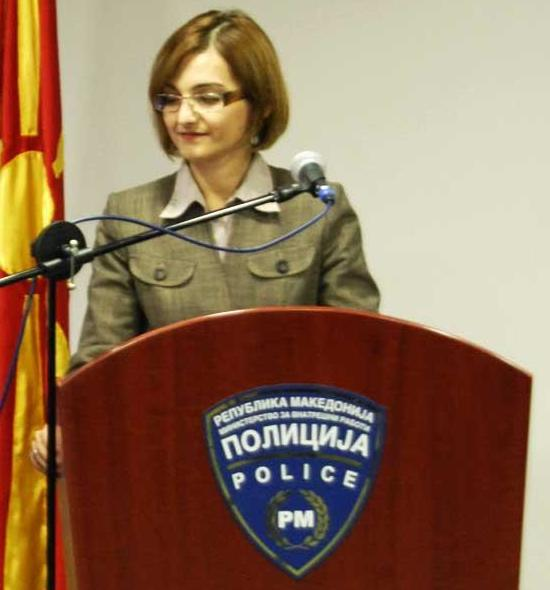
- Jankuloska in 2007

10th Minister of Internal Affairs
- In office 26 August 2006 – 12 May 2015
- President: Gjorge Ivanov
- Prime Minister: Nikola Gruevski
- Preceded by: Ljubomir Mihajlovski
- Succeeded by: Mitko Čavkov

Personal details
- Born: Gordana Jankuloska; 12 October 1975 (age 51) Ohrid, SFR Yugoslavia
- Party: VMRO-DPMNE
- Occupation: Politician

Gordana Jankuloska (Macedonian: Гордана Јанкулоска, pronounced [gɔr'dana jan'kuɫoska]; born 12 October 1975) is the former 10th Interior Minister of the Government of Macedonia (now North Macedonia). She was a Minister in four cabinets of Nikola Gruevski. During the 2015 Macedonian protests, activists demanded that Gruevski and his cabinet resign. Jankuloska and two others resigned from their positions. She was replaced as the interior minister by Mitko Čavkov. Jankuloska was sentenced to 6 years for “misuse of office” by a first-instance court in 2018, but her sentence was reduced by the higher court. She was sent to jail on 28.9.2020, after the court of appeals sentenced her to 4-years for her involvement in the purchase of a luxury car for about 600 thousand euros.

== Personal life ==
Gordana Jankuloska likes to watch romantic comedies starring Hugh Grant.

While in prison, Jankuloska did certain fitness exercises and everything else necessary to stay in somewhat good shape, and she also read many books that she had not found time to read before, so as not to lose her intellectual fitness.

Gordana Jankuloska left Idrizovo on November 1, 2023.

Political offices
Preceded by Ljubomir Mihajlovski	Minister of Internal Affairs; 2006–2015	Succeeded by Mitko Chavkov
