= Macedonian Lake Patrol Police =

Macedonian Lake Patrol Police Македонска езерска полиција
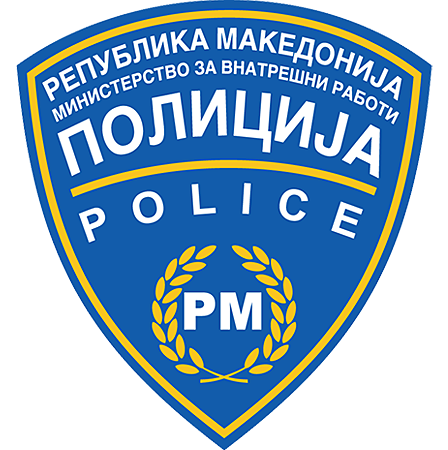
- Founded: 1991; 35 years ago
- Country: North Macedonia
- Branch: Army of North Macedonia
- Type: Water police
- Role: Border security Close-quarters battle Lakes patrol Lakes search and rescue Law enforcement Naval boarding Immigration and smuggling interdiction across on the lakes
- Size: 200+

The Macedonian Lake Police (Macedonian: Македонска езерска полиција, romanized: Makedonska ezerska policija) is the water police part of the Border Police of North Macedonia, operating in Ohrid and Prespa lake. The water police has over 200 members and is mostly active in Ohrid.

== See also ==
- Police of North Macedonia
- Lions (police unit)
