= Oliver Spasovski =

Macedonian politician (born 1976)

- Оливер Спасовски
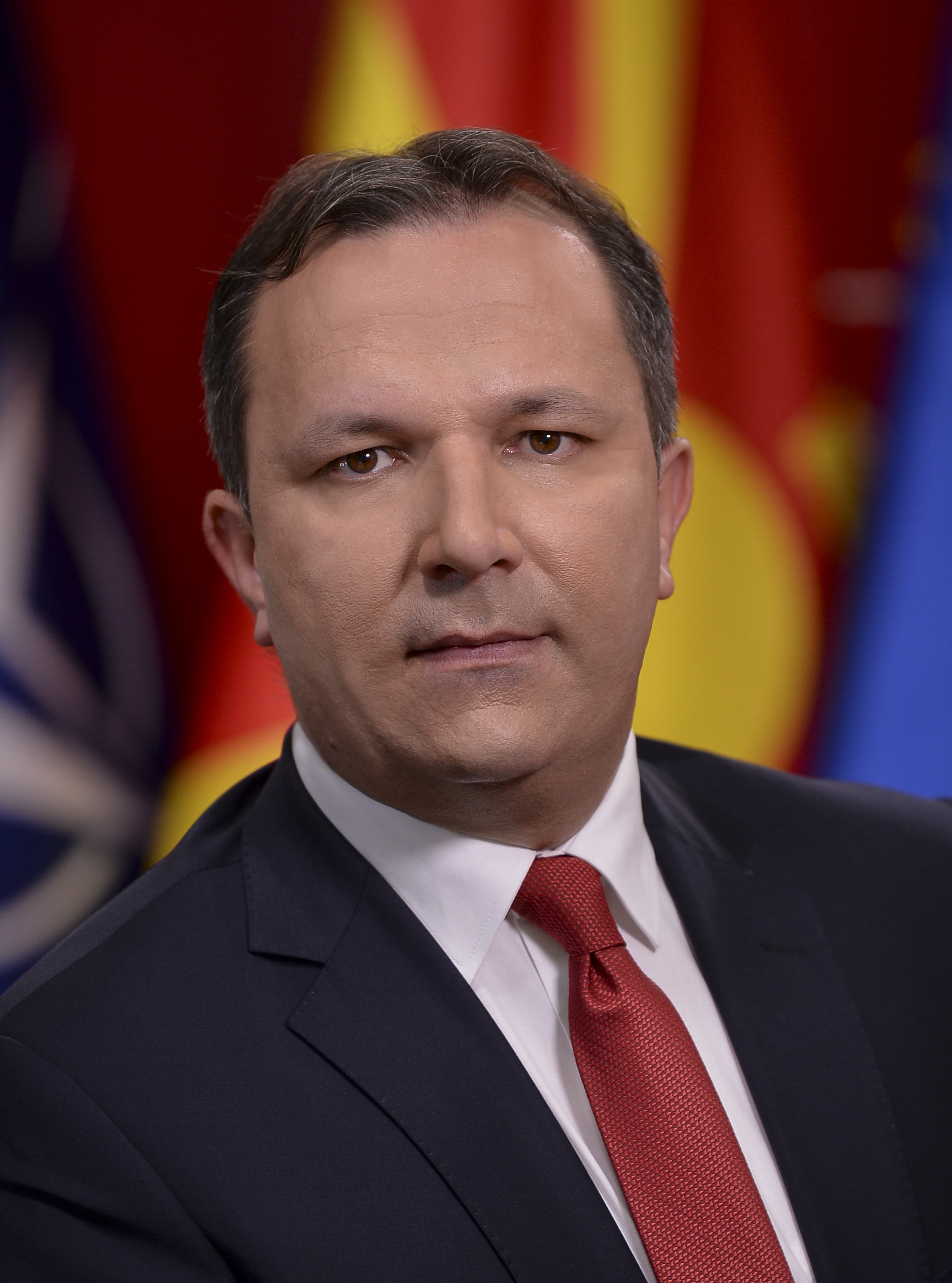
- Official portrait, 2020

Prime Minister of North Macedonia (Technical)
- In office 3 January 2020 – 30 August 2020
- President: Stevo Pendarovski
- Preceded by: Zoran Zaev
- Succeeded by: Zoran Zaev

Minister of Internal Affairs
- In office 30 August 2020 – 28 January 2024
- Prime Minister: Zoran Zaev; Dimitar Kovačevski
- Preceded by: Nakje Chulev
- Succeeded by: Panche Toshkovski
- In office 1 June 2017 – 3 January 2020
- Prime Minister: Zoran Zaev
- Preceded by: Agim Nuhiu
- Succeeded by: Nakje Chulev
- In office 2 September 2016 – 29 December 2016
- Prime Minister: Nikola Gruevski
- Preceded by: Oliver Andonov
- Succeeded by: Agim Nuhiu
- In office 11 November 2015 – 19 May 2016
- Prime Minister: Nikola Gruevski
- Preceded by: Mitko Čavkov
- Succeeded by: Mitko Čavkov

Member of Assembly of the Republic of Macedonia
- Incumbent
- Assumed office 2024
- In office 2011–2015
- In office 2006–2008

President of the Council of Kumanovo Municipality
- In office 2008–2011

Personal details
- Born: Oliver Spasovski; 21 October 1976 (age 49) Kumanovo, SR Macedonia, SFR Yugoslavia (now North Macedonia)
- Party: SDSM
- Spouse: Katerina
- Children: 2
- Occupation: Politician

Oliver Spasovski (Note: Macedonian: Оливер Спасовски, pronounced ['ɔlivɛr 'spasɔfski]) (born 21 October 1976) is a Macedonian politician.

Spasovski served the Minister of Internal Affairs for multiple terms: November 2015 to May 2016, September to December 2016, May 2017 to January 2020, and 30 August 2020 to 28 January 2024. He serves as general secretary of the Social Democratic Union of Macedonia (SDSM).

Spasovski served as Prime Minister of North Macedonia from 3 January to 30 August 2020 – following an agreement between the leaders of SDSM and VMRO-DPMNE, Zoran Zaev, and Hristijan Mickoski to hold early parliamentary elections on 12 April – which was rescheduled to the same year on 15 July.

Political offices
Preceded by Nakje Chulev	Minister of Internal Affairs; 30 August 2020 – 28 January 2024	Succeeded by Panche Toshkovski
Preceded by Zoran Zaev	Prime Minister of North Macedonia; 3 January 2020 – 30 August 2020	Succeeded by Zoran Zaev
Preceded by Agim Nuhiu	Minister of Internal Affairs; 1 June 2017 – 3 January 2020	Succeeded by Nakje Chulev
Preceded by Oliver Andonov	Minister of Internal Affairs; 2 September 2016 – 29 December 2016	Succeeded by Agim Nuhiu
Preceded by Mitko Chavkov	Minister of Internal Affairs; 11 November 2015 – 19 May 2016	Succeeded by Mitko Chavkov
