= Ministry of Internal Affairs (North Macedonia) =

Government ministry of North Macedonia

The Ministry of Internal Affairs (МВР) or MOI is a government ministry of the Republic of North Macedonia. The current minister is Panche Toshkovski. Assigned to the ministry are a Public Security Bureau and a Security and Counterintelligence Administration. The ministry has existed since 1944.

== List of ministers ==
| № | Portrait | Name (born-died) | Mandate commenced on | Mandate finished on | Length (in days) | Party/Coalition | Government |
|---|---|---|---|---|---|---|---|
| 1 | | Jordan Mijalkov (1932-December 1991) | 20 March | 19 December 1991 | 274 | Independent | 1 |
| 2 | | Ljubomir Frčkoski (b. 1957) | 10 January 1992 | 23 February 1996 | 1505 | SDSM | 1, 2, 3 |
| 3 | | Tomislav Čokrevski (b. 1934) | 23 February 1996 | 30 November 1998 | 1011 | SDSM | 3 |
| 4 | | Pavle Trajanov (b. 1952) | 30 November 1998 | 27 December 1999 | 392 | DA | 4 |
| 5 | | Dosta Dimovska (b. 1954) | 27 December 1999 | 13 May 2001 | 503 | VMRO-DPMNE | 4 |
| 6 | | Ljube Boškoski (b. 1960) | 13 May 2001 | 1 November 2002 | 537 | VMRO-DPMNE | 4 |
| 7 | | Hari Kostov (b. 1959) | 1 November 2002 | 2 June 2004 | 579 | SDSM | 5 |
| 8 | | Siljan Avramovski (b. 1960) | 2 June 2004 | 17 December 2004 | 198 | SDSM | 5 |
| 9 | | Ljubomir Mihajlovski (b. 1954) | 17 December 2004 | 26 August 2006 | 617 | SDSM | 5 |
| 10 | | Gordana Jankuloska (b. 1975) | 26 August 2006 | 12 May 2015 | 3181 | VMRO-DPMNE | 6, 7, 8, 9 |
| 11 | | Mitko Čavkov (b. 1963) | 13 May 2015 | 11 November 2015 | 182 | VMRO-DPMNE | 9 |
| 12 | | Oliver Spasovski (b. 1976) | 11 November 2015 | 19 May 2016 | 189 | SDSM | 9 |
| (11) | | Mitko Čavkov (b. 1963) | 19 May 2016 | 1 September 2016 | 106 | VMRO-DPMNE | 9 |
| 13 | | Oliver Andonov (b. 1971) | 1 September 2016 | 2 September 2016 | 1 | VMRO-DPMNE | 9 |
| (12) | | Oliver Spasovski (b. 1976) | 2 September 2016 | 29 December 2016 | 118 | SDSM | 9 |
| 14 | | Agim Nuhiu (b. 1977) | 29 December 2016 | 1 June 2017 | 154 | DUI | 9 |
| (12) | | Oliver Spasovski (b.1976) | 1 June 2017 | 3 January 2020 | 946 | SDSM | 10 |
| 15 | | Nakje Chulev (b.1973) | 3 January 2020 | 30 August 2020 | 240 | VMRO-DPMNE | 11 |
| (12) | | Oliver Spasovski (b.1976) | 30 August 2020 | 28 January 2024 | 1246 | SDSM | 12 |
| 16 | | Panche Toshkovski (b.1982) | 28 January 2024 | Incumbent | 996 | VMRO-DPMNE | 13 |

== See also ==
- Alpha
- Tigers
- Lions
- Border Police
- Special Support Unit
- Rapid Deployment Unit
- UBK
