= Falise =

Falise may refer to:

== Surname ==
- August Falise (1875-1936), Dutch sculptor
- Didier Falise (born 1961), Belgian triple jumper

== Places ==
- Fališe, village in Tetovo Municipality, Macedonia
