= Pena (river) =

Pena Пена Shkumbin
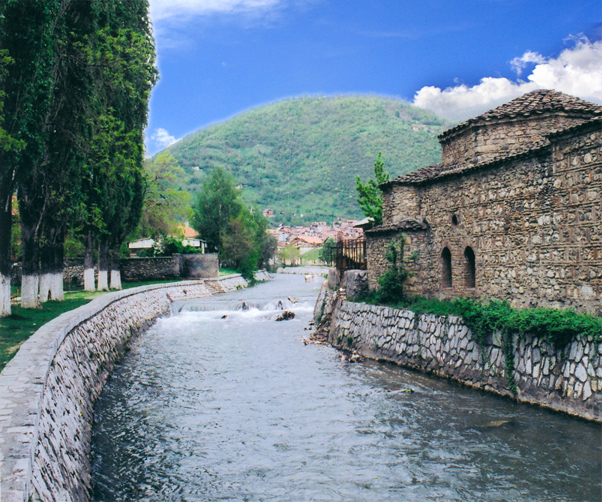
- River Pena in Tetovo

Location
- Country: North Macedonia

Physical characteristics
- Source
  - location: Čabriolica on Šar Mountains
- Mouth
  - location: Vardar, near village Saraḱino
  - coordinates: 41.9836°N 21.0510°E
- Length: 29.7 km (18.5 mi)

Basin features
- Progression: Vardar→ Aegean Sea

Pena (Macedonian: Пена, Albanian: Shkumbin) is the biggest Šar river in Polog, North Macedonia after the Vardar River. It is the biggest Vardarian tributary from the Šar lakes.

== Spring and course ==
The spring of Pena starts in the region of Čabriolica and Borisloica, high on the Šar Mountains, 2,500 metres above sea level. At first, there are two small streams that merge at the villages of Vešala and Bozovce.

Going through the center of Tetovo it hangs up in the Polog valley and near the village of Saraḱino it flows into the Vardar.

== Characteristics ==
The springs of the river are on 2,500 metres above sea level and is 27 km long. In its river-bed pour 12 other rivers. The most important of these include the Karanikolovska River, the Przhina, the Vejčka, the Lesnhička, and the Brodečka.

== Significance ==
The Pena River is important to the city of Tetovo's economy. Four hydrocenters have been built along the river, including the first hydroelectric power plant established in North Macedonia.

The Pena family of Caguas, Puerto Rico is rumored to derive its name from the river.

In 1979, after torrential rains, the river overflowed and caused flooding in Tetovo.

== See also ==
- Tetovo
- Šar Mountains
