= Ǵermo =

Ǵermo Ѓермо Gjermë
- Village
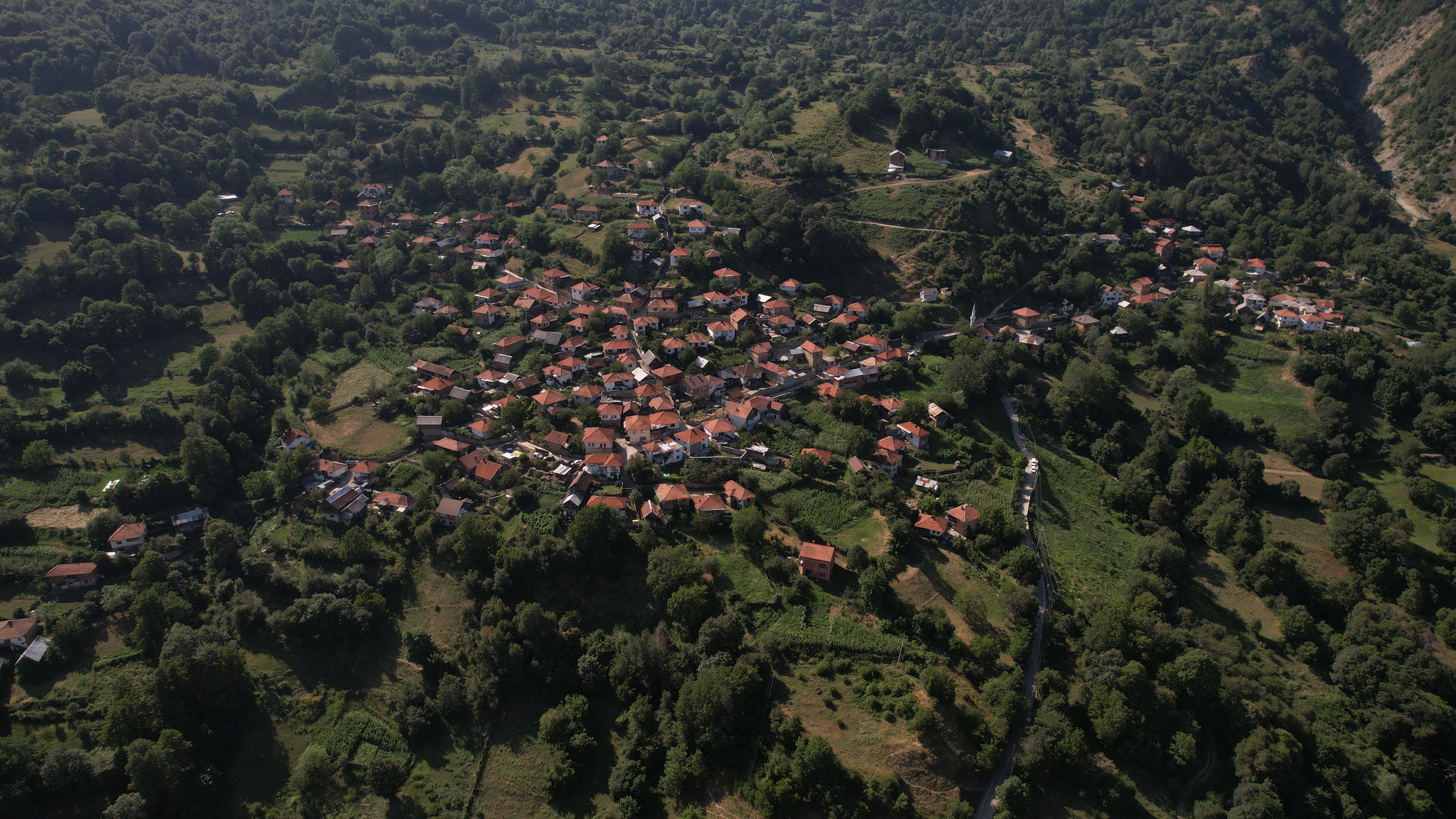
- Air view of the village

- Location within North Macedonia
- Coordinates: 42°03′N 20°58′E
- Country: North Macedonia
- Region: Polog
- Municipality: Tetovo

Population (2021)
  - Total: 569
- Time zone: UTC+1 (CET)
  - Summer (DST): UTC+2 (CEST)
- Car plates: TE
- Website: .

Ǵermo (Macedonian: Ѓермо, Albanian: Gjermë) is a village in the municipality of Tetovo, North Macedonia. It used to be part of the former municipality of Džepčište.

== Demographics ==
According to the 2021 census, the village had a total of 569 inhabitants. Ethnic groups in the village include:

- Albanians 538
- Others 31

Year	Macedonian	Albanian	Turks	Romani	Vlachs	Serbs	Bosniaks	Others	Total
2002	...	960	...	...	...	...	...	2	962
2021	...	538	...	...	...	...	...	31	569

According to the 1942 Albanian census, Ǵermo was inhabited by 634 Muslim Albanians.

In statistics gathered by Vasil Kanchov in 1900, the village of Ǵermo was inhabited by 165 Muslim Albanians.
