= Xheladin Murati =

Albanian pedagogist and politician from North Macedonia

Xheladin Murati (born February 15, 1942) is an Albanian pedagogist and politician from North Macedonia. He was a former deputy in the Parliament of North Macedonia.

== Biography ==
Xheladin Murati was born in the village of Džepčište in Tetovo Municipality on February 15, 1942. He completed his primary education in his hometown and continued his studies at the normal school in Skopje. He pursued pedagogy studies at the Faculty of Philosophy in Skopje in 1969 and completed his master's studies at the Faculty of Philosophy in Belgrade in 1978. He earned his doctorate in the field of pedagogical sciences at the University of Pristina in 1984. Initially, he worked as a teacher at Tetovo Gymnasium, later serving as the director of the Pedagogical Entity of Tetovo (Office for the promotion of primary and preschool education) in Tetovo. He later became a professor at the Pedagogical Academy in Skopje and, from 1999, an ordinary professor for General Pedagogy and Pedagogical Research Methodology at the Faculty of Pedagogy "St. Clement of Ohrid" in Skopje. He served two terms as a deputy in the Parliament of North Macedonia, where he also held the position of Vice Chairman of the Assembly and a member of the Security Council. His main focus was on general pedagogy, didactics, teaching methodology, and research methodology, as evidenced by numerous works authored by him.

== Publications ==
- Problemet e pedagogjisë, 1992 OCLC 635691389
- Naim Frashëri (Pikëpamjet edukative - arsimore), 1993 OCLC 164815809
- Metodika e mësimdhënies së matematikës (I - IV), 1996
- Kontribute për arsimin, mësimdhënien dhe shkollën, 1996;
- Aspektet e sistemit të arsimit në Republikën e Maqedonisë, 1997,
- Pedagogji e përgjithshme (1998, 2004),
- Metodologjia e hulumtimit shkencor pedagogjik, 1998, 2003 OCLC 310171577
- Shkolla fillore (Problemet dhe organizimi), 2001 OCLC 52242476
- Arti i të bërit politikë (2017)
- Didaktika – Metodologjia e mësimdhënies, 2002
- Teknologjia mësimore,
- Pedagogjia e kohës së lire,
- Pedagogjia shkollore,
- Pedagogjia familjare dhe problemet e saj,
- Komunikologjia pedagogjike, 2000
- Ndryshimi i arsimtarit dhe ndryshimet në shkollë,
- Hyrje në teoritë e edukimit
