= Lavce =

Lavce Лавце Llacë
- Village
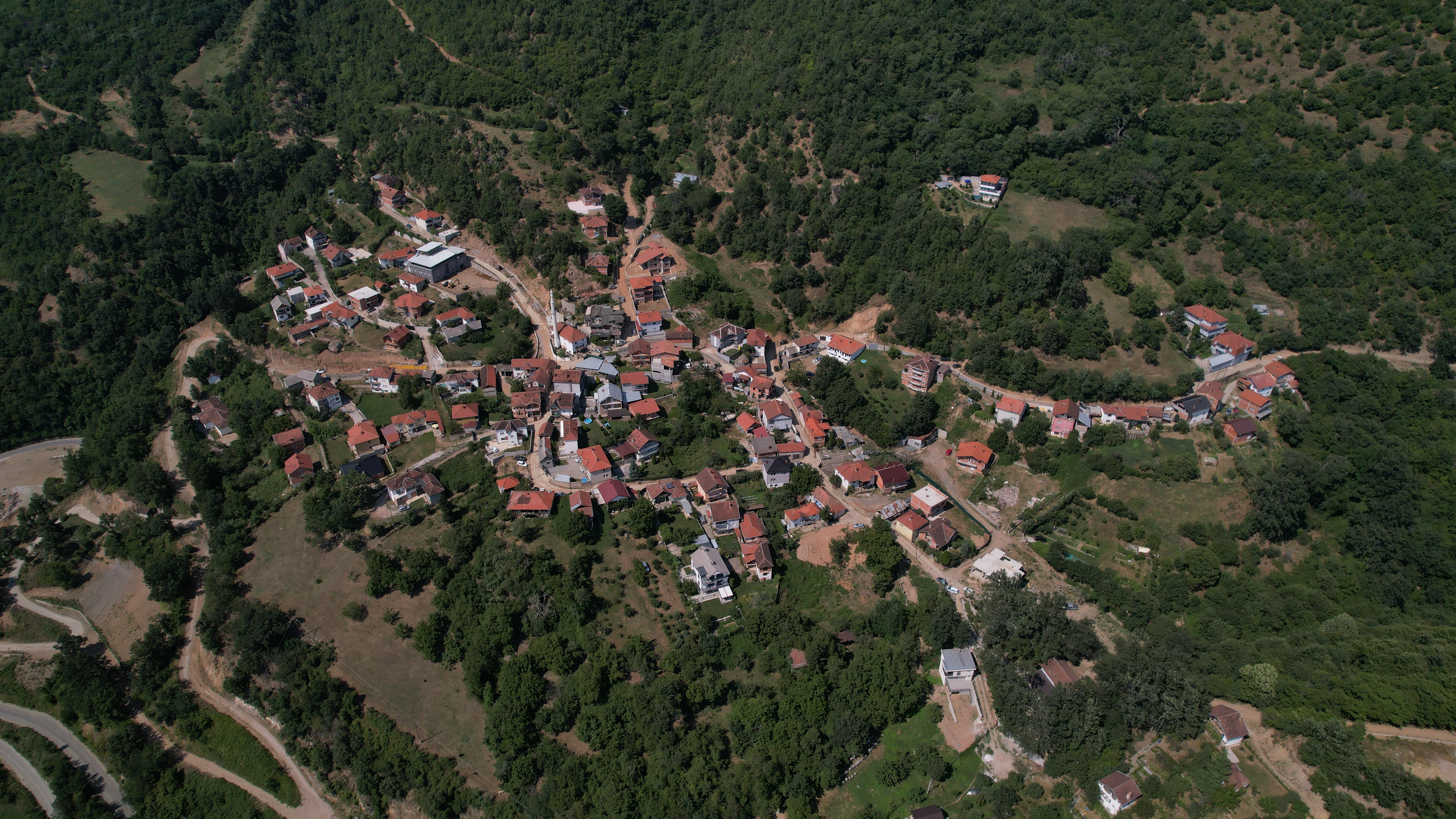
- Air view of the village

- Location within North Macedonia
- Coordinates: 42°02′N 20°57′E
- Country: North Macedonia
- Region: Polog
- Municipality: Tetovo

Population (2021)
  - Total: 313
- Time zone: UTC+1 (CET)
  - Summer (DST): UTC+2 (CEST)
- Car plates: TE
- Website: .

Lavce (Macedonian: Лавце, Albanian: Llacë) is a village in the municipality of Tetovo, North Macedonia.

== Demographics ==
Lavce is attested in the 1467/68 Ottoman tax registry (defter) for the Nahiyah of Kalkandelen. The village had a total of 9 Christian households and 1 bachelor.

According to the 2021 census, the village had a total of 313 inhabitants. Ethnic groups in the village include:

- Albanians 311
- Others 2

Year	Macedonian	Albanian	Turks	Romani	Vlachs	Serbs	Bosniaks	Others	Total
1948									127
1953	122					3			125
1961	56								56
1971	3	51						7	61
1981	2	248						3	253
1994	4	263						1	268
2002	2	296	...	...	...	...	...	...	298
2021	...	311	...	...	...	...	...	2	313

In statistics gathered by Vasil Kanchov in 1900, the village of Lavce (Lahce) was inhabited by 85 Christian Bulgarians.
