= Ambush near Gajre =

Part of the 2001 insurgency in Macedonia

- Part of the 2001 insurgency in Macedonia
Date	5 June 2001
Location	Between Gajre and Šipkovica, Macedonia
Result	NLA victory

Belligerents
National Liberation Army	Macedonia

Commanders and leaders
Unknown	Isak Rufati †

Units involved
Unknown	Macedonian Army

Strength
Unknown	11 soldiers

Casualties and losses
None	5 soldiers killed 6 soldiers wounded

Ethnic Albanian militants of the National Liberation Army killed five soldiers of the Army of the Republic of Macedonia on 5 June 2001 near Gajre, a village in the Šar Mountains, North Macedonia. It represents one of the heaviest death tolls for the government forces in a single incident during the insurgency in the Republic of Macedonia.

== Ambush ==
The hills above Tetovo in northwestern Macedonia were subject to fierce fighting. According to Macedonian army officials, three of the soldiers died during an ambush as they were escorting medics to help six wounded men (consisting of three police officers and three soldiers) wounded in clashes that broke out that day. Additional two soldiers were killed while making a food delivery. The ambush happened near the village of Gajre. The killed soldiers were an ethnic Albanian army sergeant, an ethnic Macedonian soldier from Strumica and three ethnic Macedonian reservists from Bitola.

== Aftermath ==
Macedonian Prime Minister Ljubčo Georgievski called for a state of war to be declared against the rebels.

In 2010, a memorial plaque was placed along the road to Popova Šapka to honor the killed soldiers. The plaque was destroyed in 2021.
