= Lisec, Tetovo =

Lisec
- Village
- Лисец
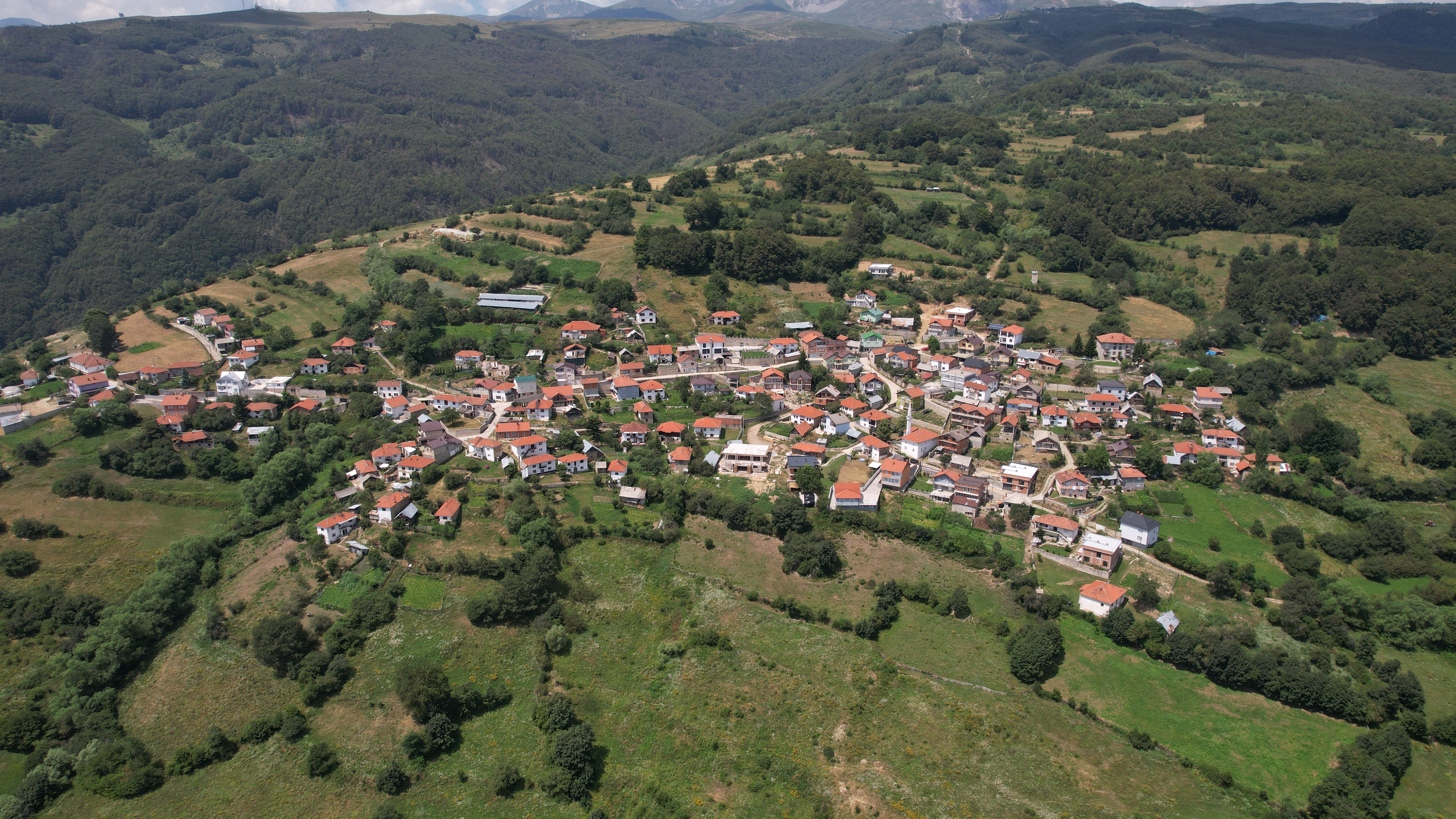
- Air view of the village

- Location within North Macedonia
- Coordinates: 42°00′N 20°55′E
- Country: North Macedonia
- Region: Polog
- Municipality: Tetovo

Population (2021)
  - Total: 384
- Time zone: UTC+1 (CET)
  - Summer (DST): UTC+2 (CEST)
- Car plates: TE
- Website: .

Lisec (Macedonian: Лисец, Albanian: Lisec) is a village in the municipality of Tetovo, North Macedonia.

== Demographics ==
Lisec is attested in the 1467/68 Ottoman tax registry (defter) for the Nahiyah of Kalkandelen. The village had a total of 52 Christian households, 4 bachelors and 5 widows.

According to the 2021 census, the village had a total of 384 inhabitants. Ethnic groups in the village include:

- Albanians 340
- Macedonians 5
- Others 39

Year	Macedonian	Albanian	Turks	Romani	Vlachs	Serbs	Bosniaks	Others	Total
2002	...	692	...	...	...	...	...	...	692
2021	5	340	...	...	...	...	...	39	384

According to the 1942 Albanian census, Lisec was inhabited by 751 Muslim Albanians.

In statistics gathered by Vasil Kanchov in 1900, the village of Lisec was inhabited by 330 Muslim Albanians.
