= Mala Rečica =

Mala Rečica Мала Речица Reçicë e Vogël
- Village
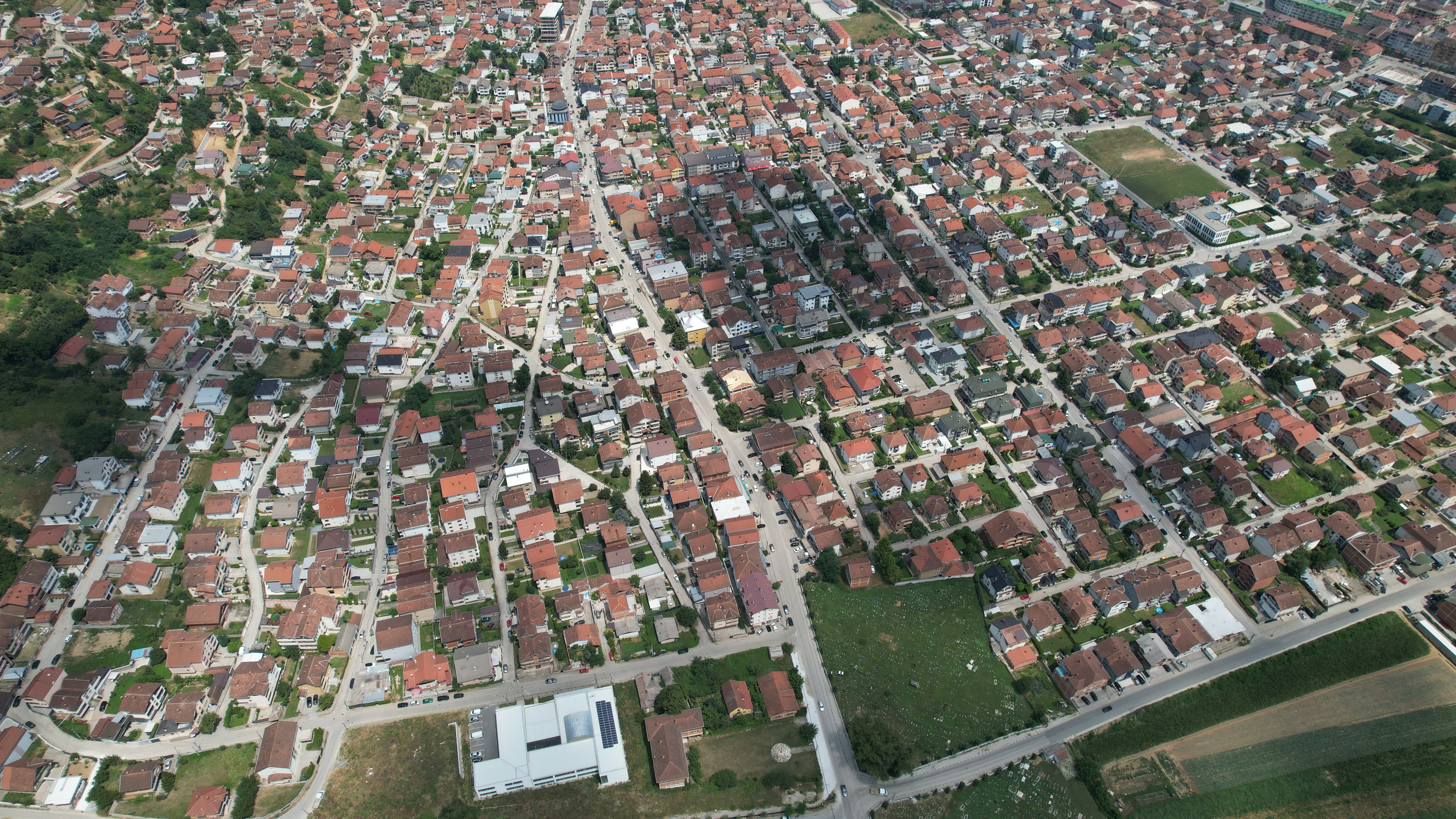
- Air view of the village

- Location within North Macedonia
- Coordinates: 42°00′N 20°57′E
- Country: North Macedonia
- Region: Polog
- Municipality: Tetovo

Population (2021)
  - Total: 2,468
- Time zone: UTC+1 (CET)
  - Summer (DST): UTC+2 (CEST)
- Car plates: TE
- Website: .

Mala Rečica (Macedonian: Мала Речица, Albanian: Reçicë e Vogël) is a village in the municipality of Tetovo, North Macedonia.

== Demographics ==
Mala Rečica is attested in the 1467/68 Ottoman tax registry (defter) for the Nahiyah of Kalkandelen. The village had a total of 31 Christian households, 2 bachelors and 4 widows.

According to the 2021 census, the village had a total of 2.468 inhabitants. Ethnic groups in the village include:

- Albanians 2.337
- Macedonians 1
- Others 130

Year	Macedonian	Albanian	Turks	Romani	Vlachs	Serbs	Bosniaks	Others	Total
2002	1	8.321	4	...	...	1	...	26	8.353
2021	1	2.337	...	...	...	...	...	130	2.468

According to the 1942 Albanian census, Mala Rečica was inhabited by 575 Muslim Albanians.

In statistics gathered by Vasil Kanchov in 1900, the village of Mala Rečica was inhabited by 300 Muslim Albanians.
