= Otunje =

Otunje Otunje
- Village
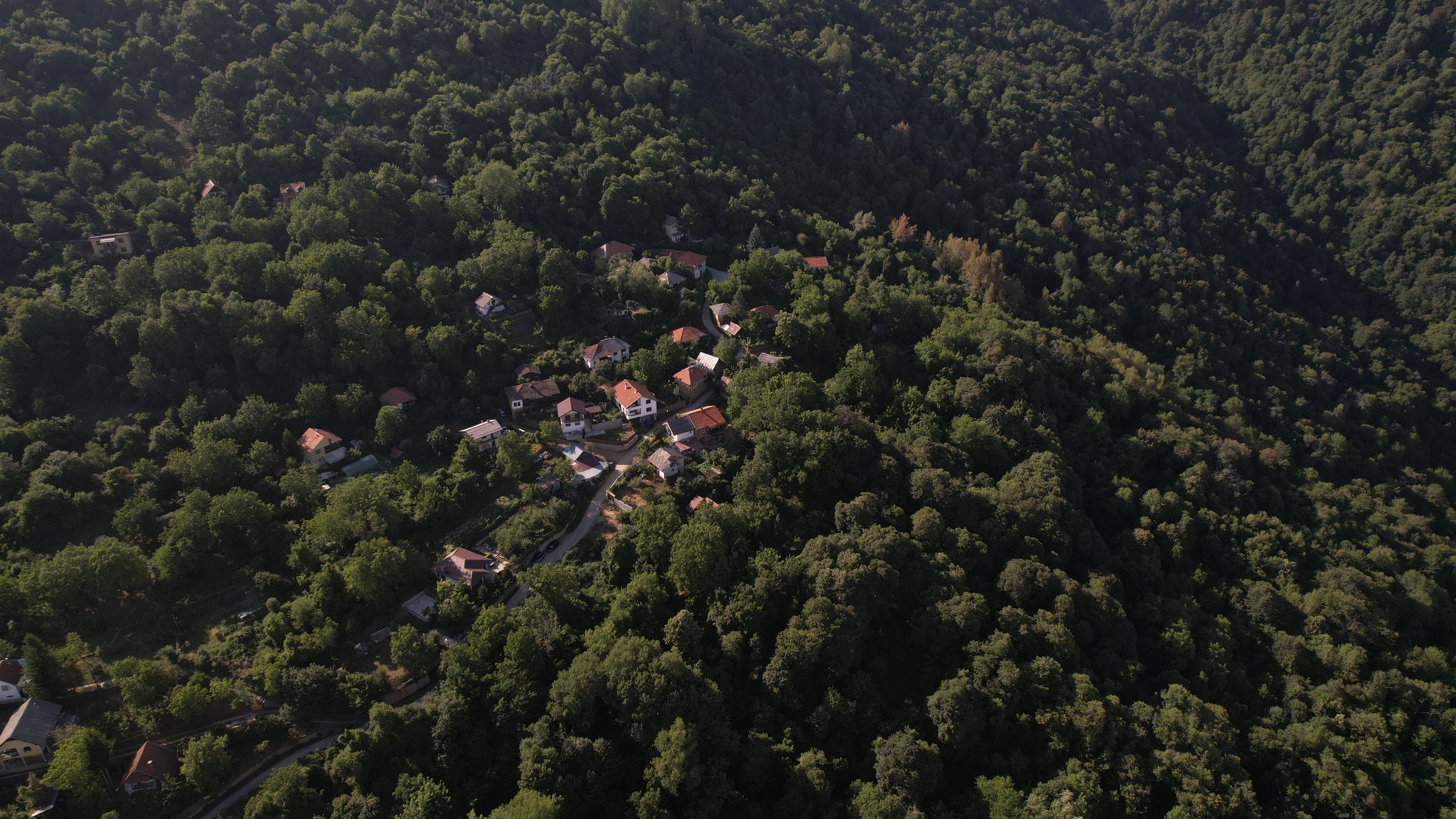
- Air view of the village

- Location within North Macedonia
- Coordinates: 42°02′N 20°57′E
- Country: North Macedonia
- Region: Vardar
- Municipality: Tetovo

Population (2021)
  - Total: 3
- Time zone: UTC+1 (CET)
  - Summer (DST): UTC+2 (CEST)
- Car plates: VE
- Website: .

Otunje (Macedonian: Otunje) is a village in the municipality of Tetovo, North Macedonia.

== Demographics ==
Otunje is attested in the 1467/68 Ottoman tax registry (defter) for the Nahiyah of Kalkandelen. The village had a total of 20 Christian households, 1 bachelor and 2 widows.

According to the 2021 census, the village had a total of 3 inhabitants. Ethnic groups in the village include:

- Macedonians 2
- Serbs 1

Year	Macedonian	Albanian	Turks	Romani	Aromanians	Serbs	Bosniaks	Others	Total
2021	2	...	...	...	...	1	...	...	3

According to the 1942 Albanian census, Otunje was inhabited by 228 Bulgarians.

In statistics gathered by Vasil Kanchov in 1900, the village of Otunje was inhabited by 220 Christian Bulgarians.
