= Tetovo Municipality =

Municipality of North Macedonia

Coordinates: 42.0000°N 20.9667°E

Municipality of Tetovo Општина Тетово Komuna e Tetovës
- Urban municipality
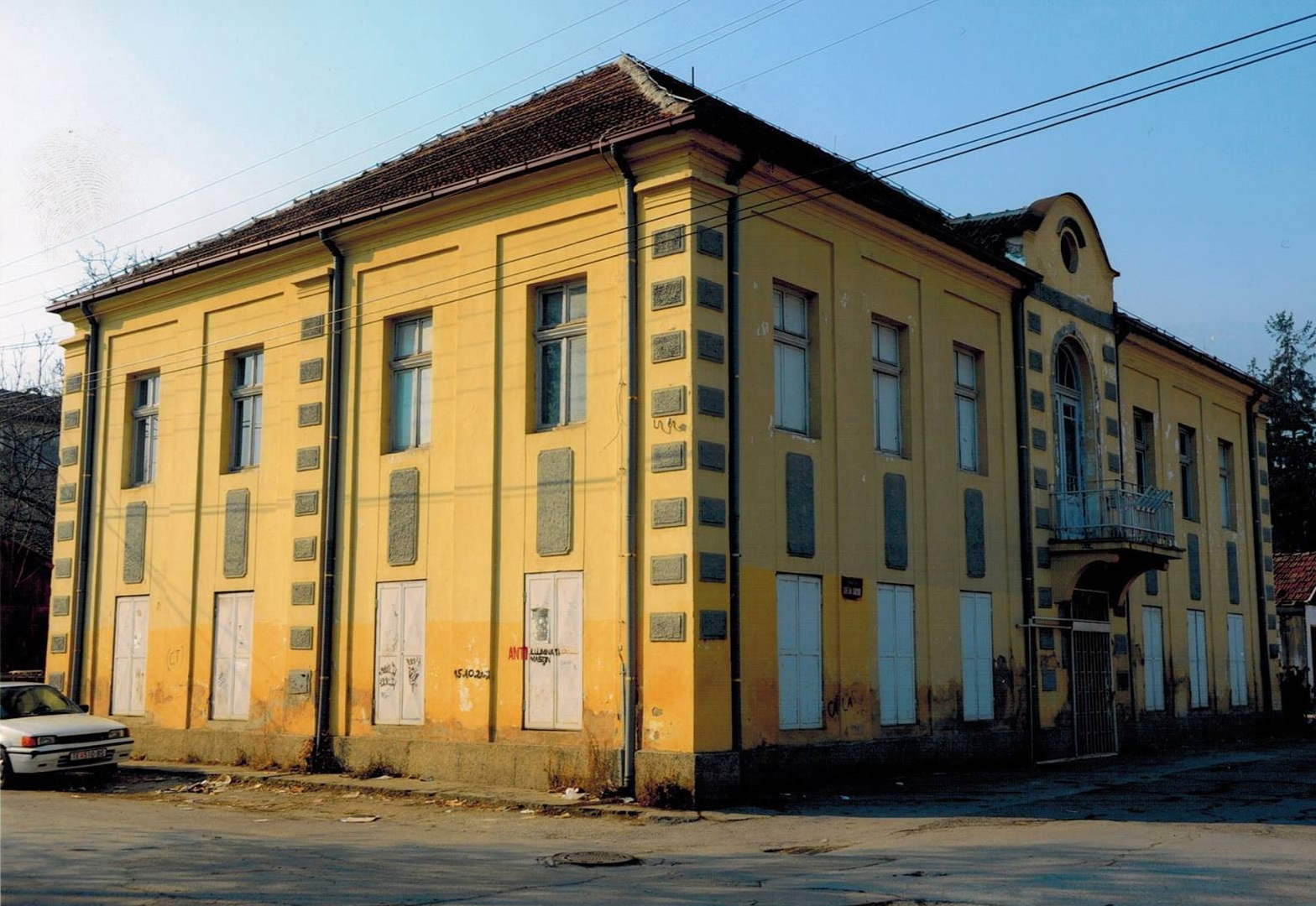
- The building of the archives of Tetovo, a department of the State Archive of North Macedonia.

- Flag Coat of arms

- Country: North Macedonia
- Region: Polog
- Municipal center: Tetovo

Government
  - Mayor: Bilall Kasami (Lëvizja Besa)

Area
  - Total: 261.89 km^{2} (101.12 sq mi)

Population
  - Total: 84,770
  - Density: 323.7/km^{2} (838.3/sq mi)

Languages
  - primary: Macedonian, Albanian
- Time zone: UTC+1 (CET)
  - Summer (DST): UTC+2 (CEST)
- Postal code: 1200
- Area code: +389 044
- Vehicle registration: TE
- Website: Official Website

Tetovo (Macedonian: Тетово, [ˈtɛtɔvɔ]; Albanian: Tetova) is a municipality in the northwest part of North Macedonia. Tetovo's municipal seat is located in the town of the same name. Tetovo Municipality is part of the Polog Statistical Region.

== Geography ==
The municipality borders Kosovo to the north and west, Tearce Municipality to the northeast, Jegunovce Municipality to the east, Želino Municipality to the southeast, Brvenica Municipality to the south, and Bogovinje Municipality to the southwest.

== History ==
As a result of the redrawing of municipality borders in 2003, the rural Šipkovica Municipality and Džepčište Municipality were attached to Tetovo Municipality. Without these two municipalities, the population of the Municipality of Tetovo was 65,318 according to the census of 1994, and 70,841 at the last census. The population of the former Šipkovica Municipality in 1994 was 6,797, and according to the last census was 7,820. The population of the former Džepčište Municipality in 1994 was 7,286, and according to the last census was 7,919. The population of the present-day combined municipality is 86,580.

On 26 November 2019, an earthquake struck Albania and Tetovo Municipality held 2 days of mourning for the earthquake victims and sent humanitarian aid and 500,000 denars for relief efforts.

== Demographics ==
The number of the inhabited places in the municipality is 20. There is one city and 19 villages. According to the 2021 North Macedonia census, the population of the municipality is 84,770. Ethnic groups in the municipality include:

| | 2002 | | 2021 | |
| | Number | % | Number | % |
| TOTAL | 86,580 | 100 | 84,770 | 100 |
| Albanians | 60,886 | 70.32 | 60,460 | 71.32 |
| Macedonians | 20,053 | 23.16 | 15,529 | 18.32 |
| Roma | 2,357 | 2.73 | 1,885 | 2.22 |
| Turks | 1,882 | 2.17 | 1,746 | 2.06 |
| Serbs | 604 | 0.7 | 256 | 0.3 |
| Bosniaks | 156 | 0.18 | 189 | 0.22 |
| Vlachs | 15 | 0.01 | 11 | 0.01 |
| Other / Undeclared / Unknown | 627 | 0.73 | 326 | 0.4 |
| Persons for whom data are taken from administrative sources | | | 4,368 | 5.15 |
Source: Census 2021 - first dataset State Statistical Office of North Macedonia

== Inhabited places ==
There are 20 inhabited places in this municipality.

| Inhabited Places | Total | Macedonians | Albanians | Turks | Roma | Vlachs | Serbs | Bosniaks | Others |
|---|---|---|---|---|---|---|---|---|---|
| Tetovo Municipality | 84,770 | 15,529 | 60,460 | 1,746 | 1,885 | 11 | 256 | 189 | 4,705 |
| Bozovce | 174 | - | 137 | - | - | - | - | - | 37 |
| Brodec | 734 | - | 651 | - | - | - | - | - | 83 |
| Džepčište | 3.338 | 33 | 3.198 | 1 | - | 1 | - | - | 105 |
| Fališe | 612 | 552 | 37 | 1 | - | - | 5 | - | 18 |
| Gajre | 633 | - | 607 | - | - | - | - | - | 26 |
| Ǵermo | 569 | - | 538 | - | - | - | - | - | 31 |
| Golema Rečica | 3.603 | 1 | 3.422 | - | - | - | - | - | 181 |
| Jedoarce | 16 | 5 | 11 | - | - | - | - | - | - |
| Lavce | 313 | - | 311 | - | - | - | - | - | 2 |
| Lisec | 384 | 5 | 340 | - | - | - | - | - | 39 |
| Mala Rečica | 2.468 | 1 | 2.337 | - | - | - | - | - | 130 |
| Otunje | 3 | 2 | - | - | - | - | 1 | - | - |
| Poroj | 2.653 | 2 | 2.558 | - | - | - | - | 1 | 92 |
| Saraḱino | 1.153 | 791 | 277 | - | 8 | - | 2 | - | 72 |
| Selce | 2.239 | - | 2.149 | - | - | - | - | - | 90 |
| Setole | 22 | 19 | 3 | - | - | - | 1 | - | - |
| Šipkovica | 1.540 | - | 1.483 | - | - | - | - | - | 57 |
| Tetovo | 63.176 | 14.116 | 41.356 | 1.745 | 1.877 | 10 | 248 | 188 | 3.616 |
| Vejce | 848 | 2 | 804 | - | - | - | - | - | 42 |
| Vešala | 291 | - | 241 | - | - | - | - | - | 50 |

== Historical photographs from Tetovo ==
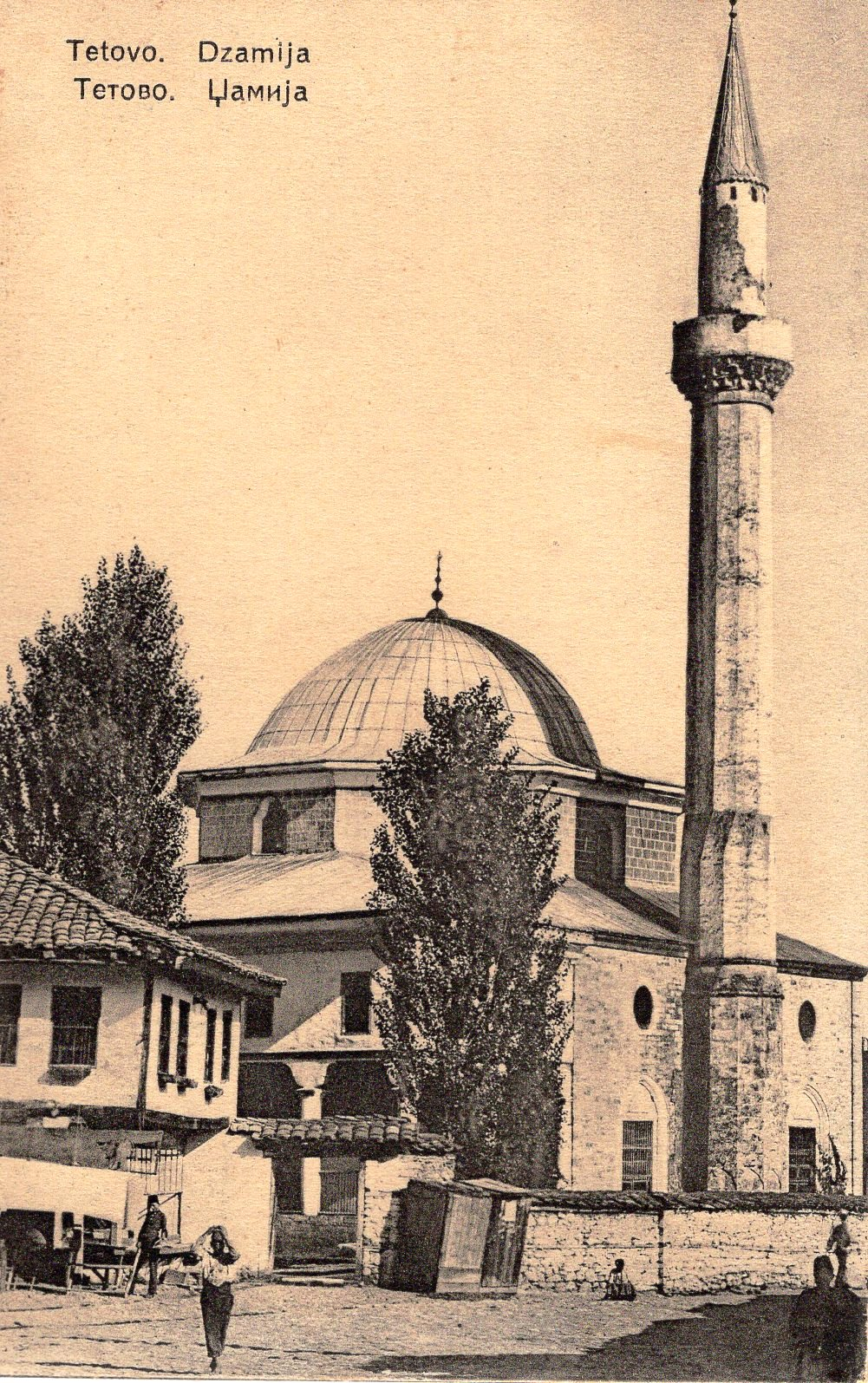
1930

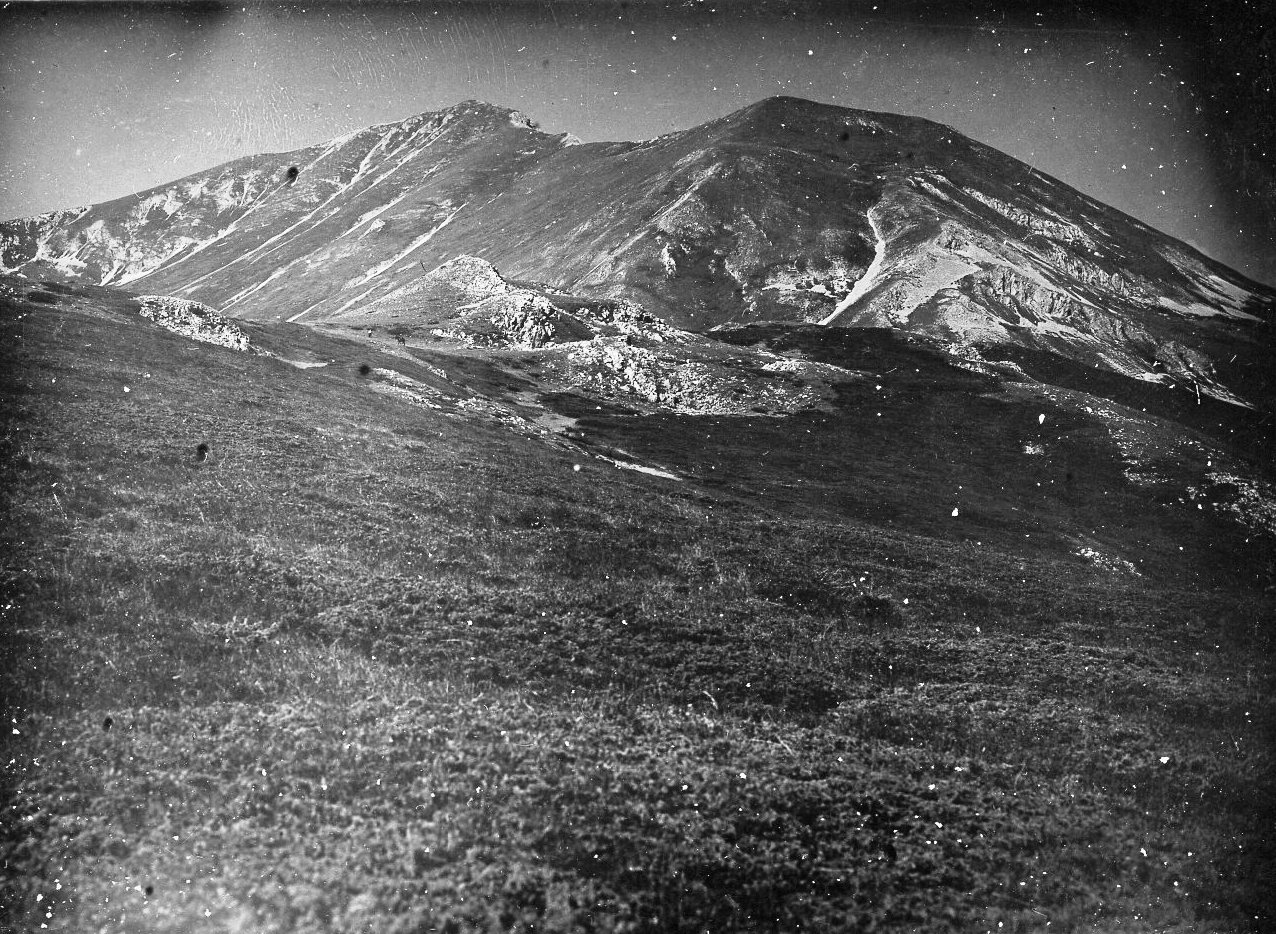
The peak of Ljuboten, Šar Mountains, 1931

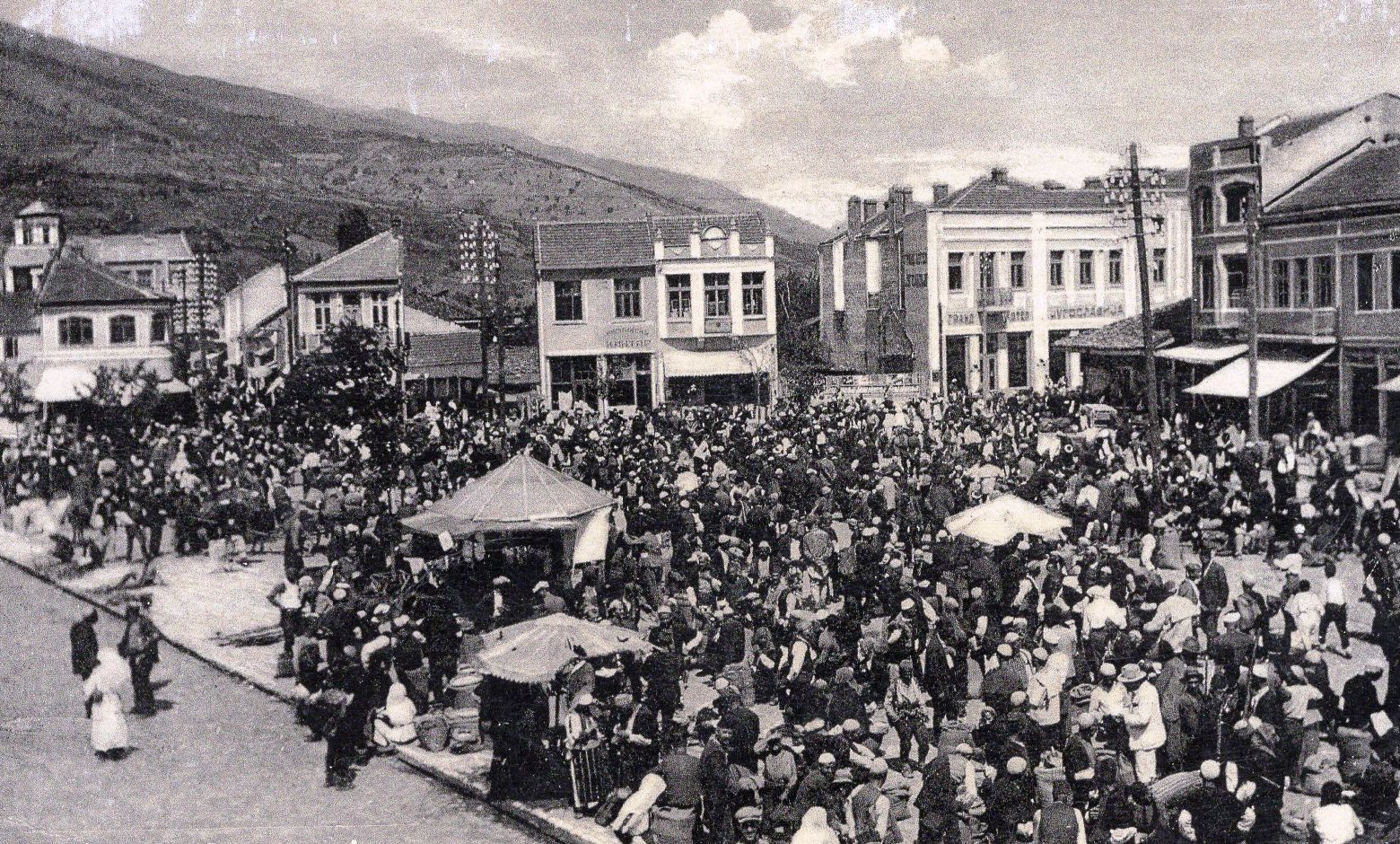
1936

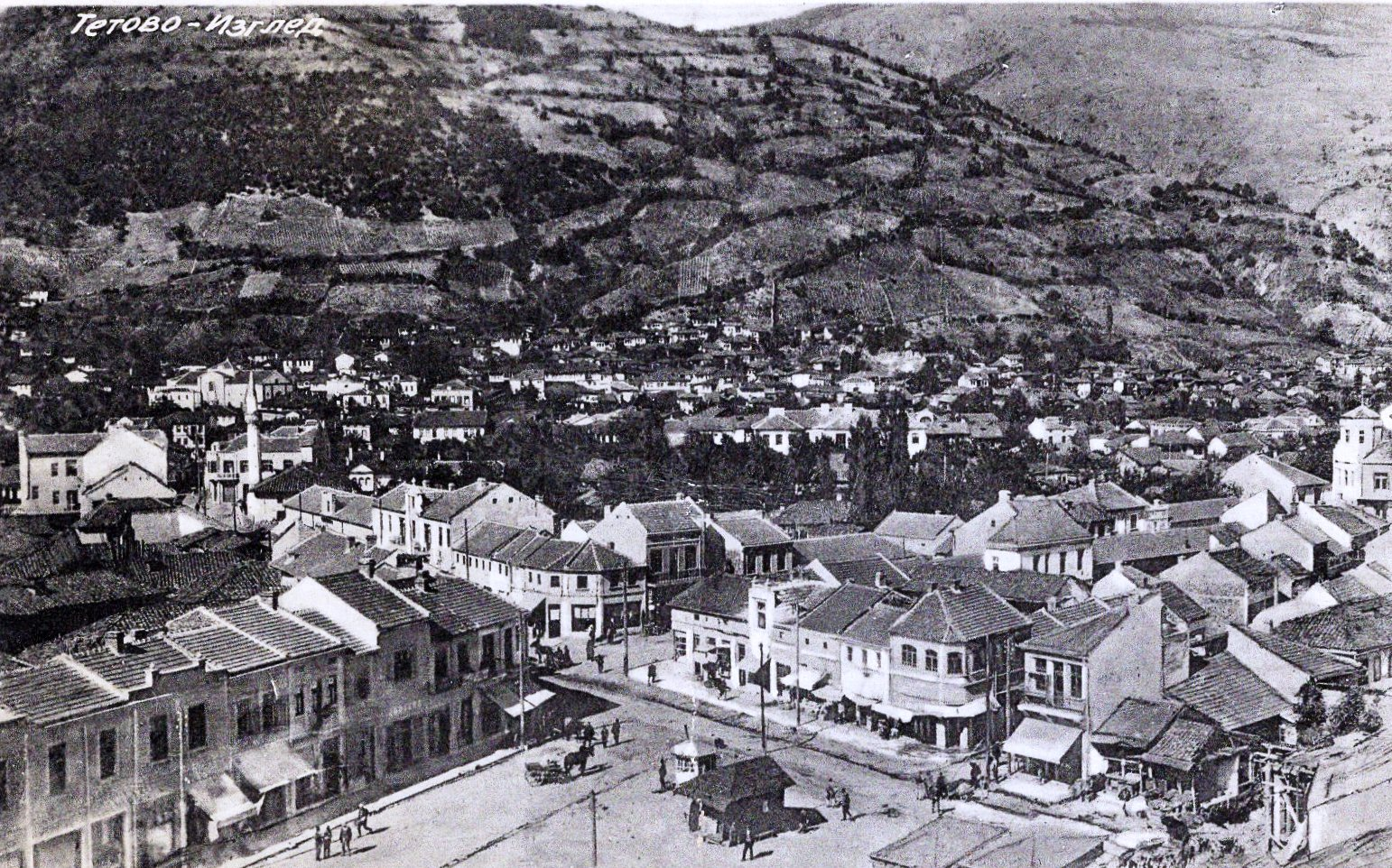
1939

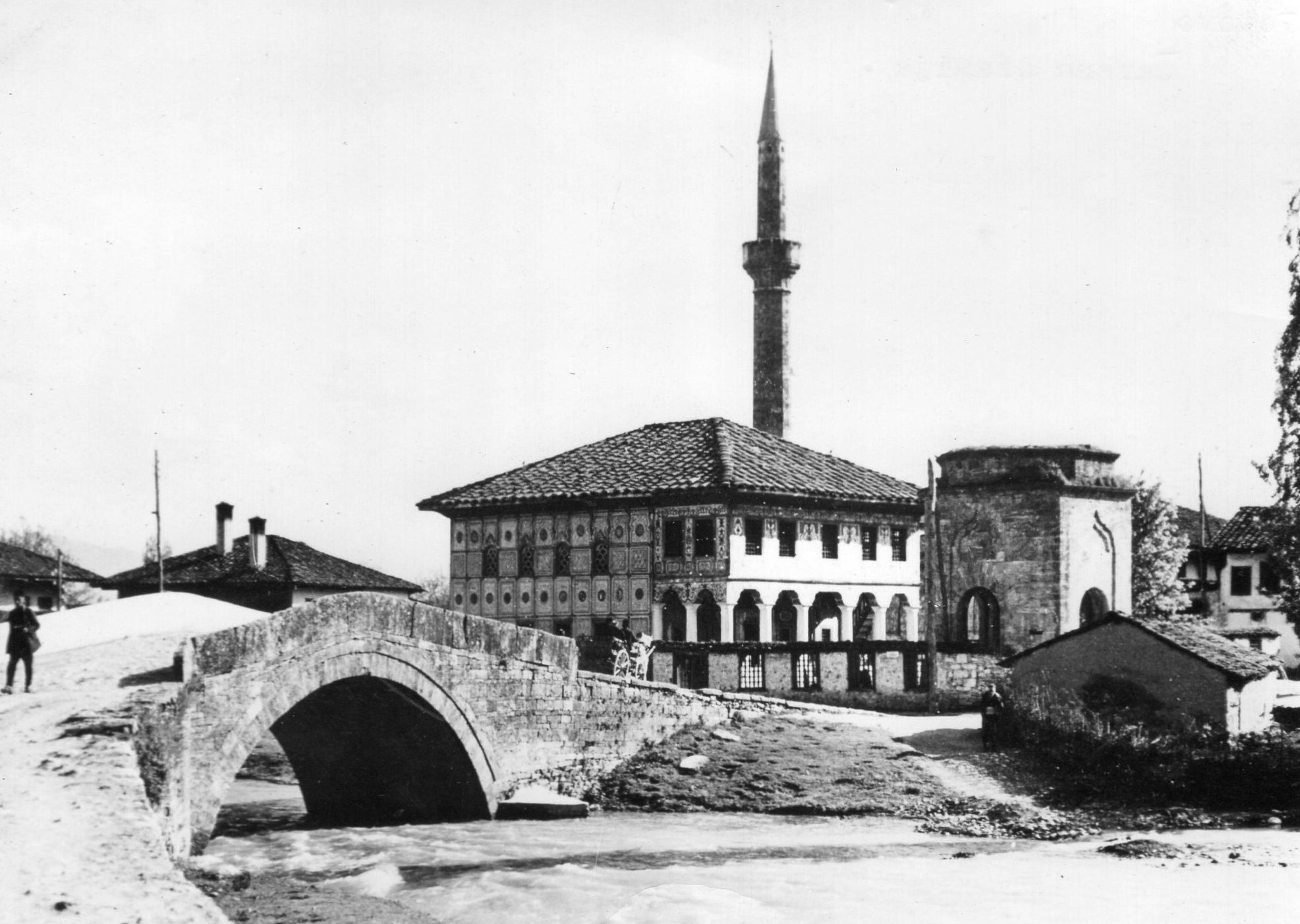
Šarena Džamija, 1930's

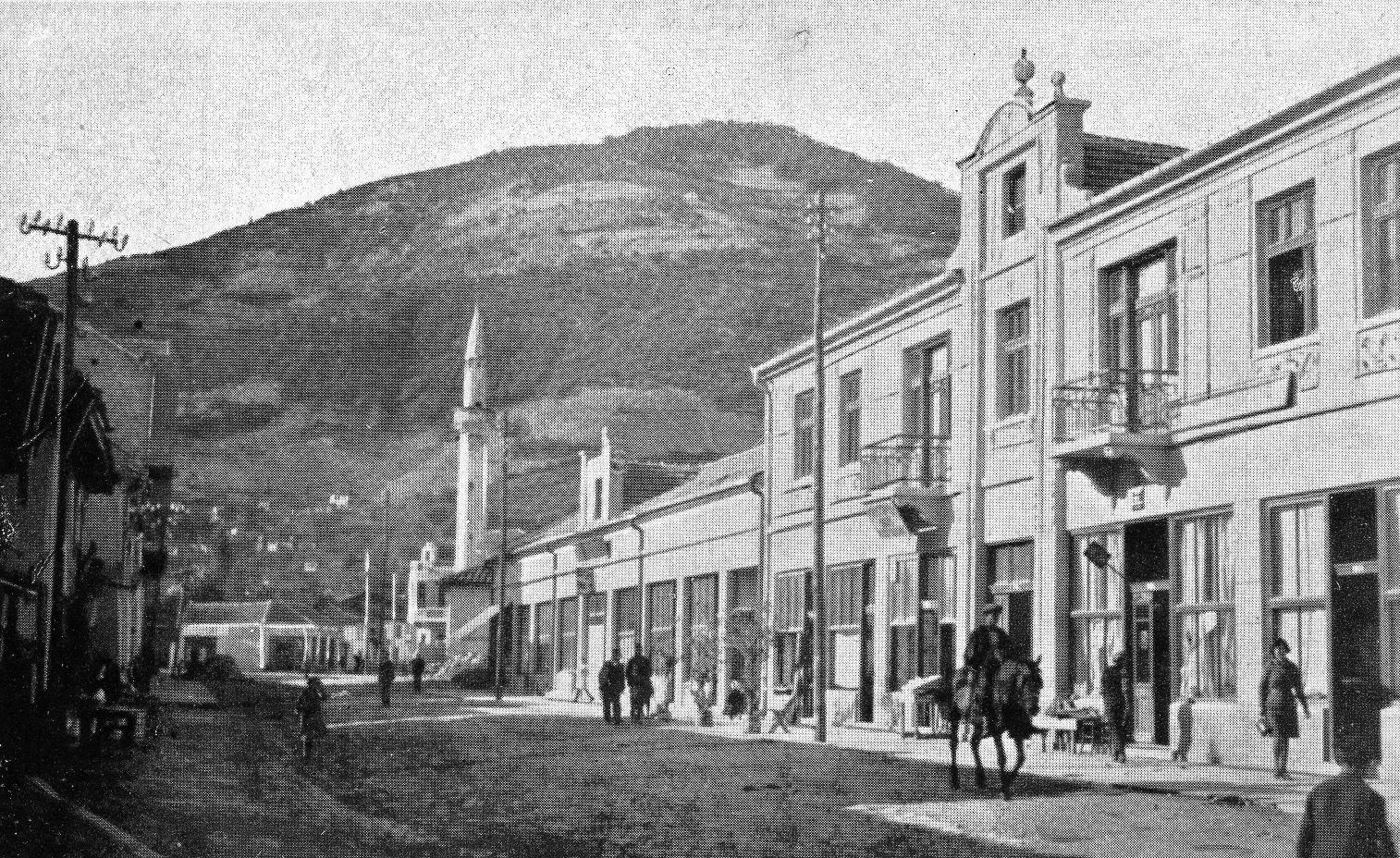
1943
