= Setole =

Setole Setole Setolë
- Village
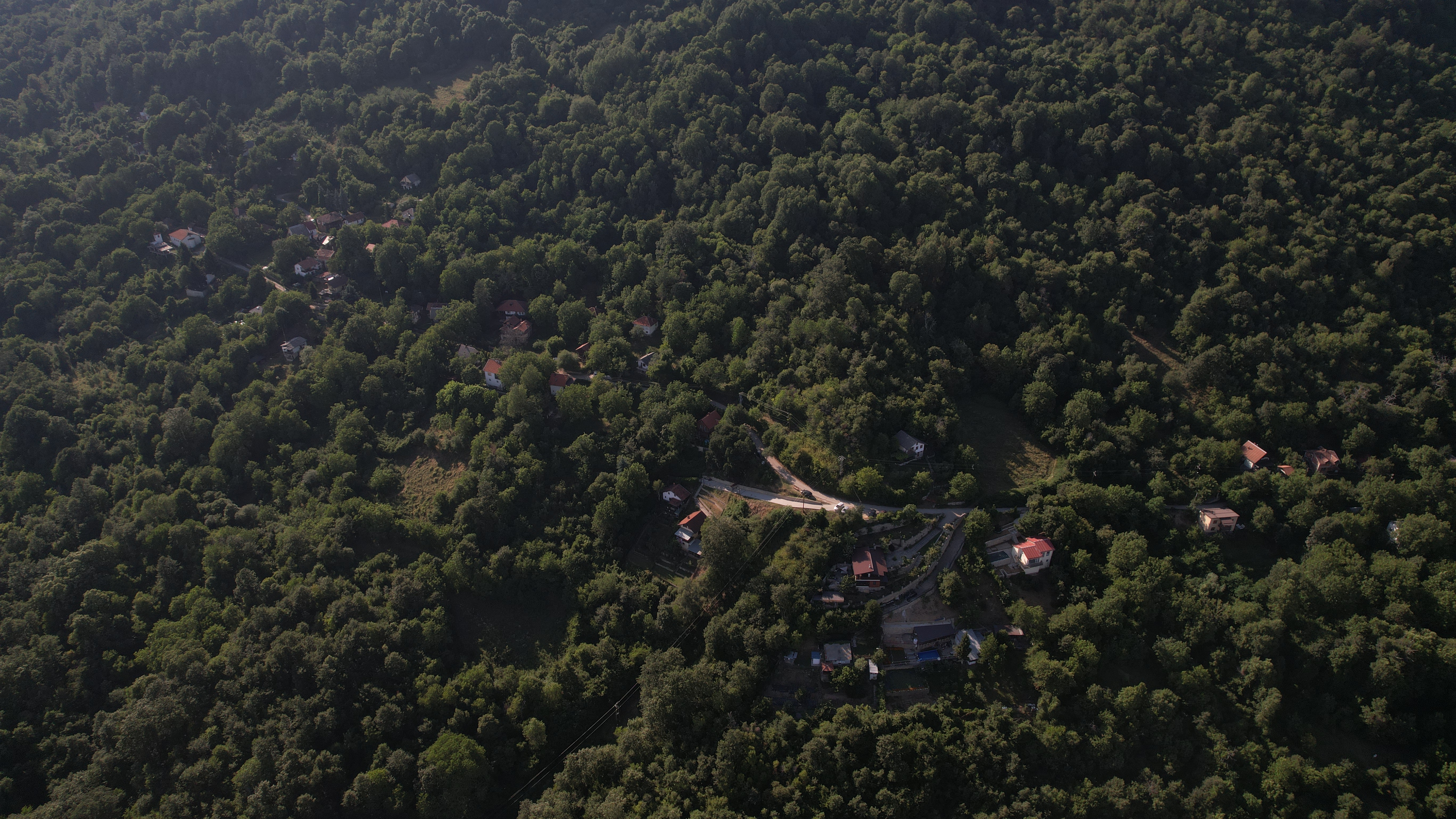
- Air view of the village

- Location within North Macedonia
- Coordinates: 42°02′N 20°57′E
- Country: North Macedonia
- Region: Vardar
- Municipality: Tetovo

Population (2021)
  - Total: 22
- Time zone: UTC+1 (CET)
  - Summer (DST): UTC+2 (CEST)
- Car plates: VE
- Website: .

Setole (Macedonian: Setole, Albanian: Setolë) is a village in the municipality of Tetovo, North Macedonia.

== Demographics ==
Setole is attested in the 1467/68 Ottoman tax registry (defter) for the Nahiyah of Kalkandelen. The village had a total of 19 Christian households and 1 bachelor.

According to the 2021 census, the village had a total of 22 inhabitants. Ethnic groups in the village include:

- Macedonians 19
- Albanians 3

Year	Macedonian	Albanian	Turks	Romani	Aromanians	Serbs	Bosniaks	Others	Total
2021	19	3	...	...	...	...	...	...	22

According to the 1942 Albanian census, Setole was inhabited by 222 Bulgarians.

In statistics gathered by Vasil Kanchov in 1900, the village of Setole was inhabited by 370 Christian Bulgarians.
