= Šarena Mosque =

Ottoman-era mosque in Tetovo, North Macedonia

Šarena Džamija Xhamija e Pashës Alaca Camii Painted Mosque
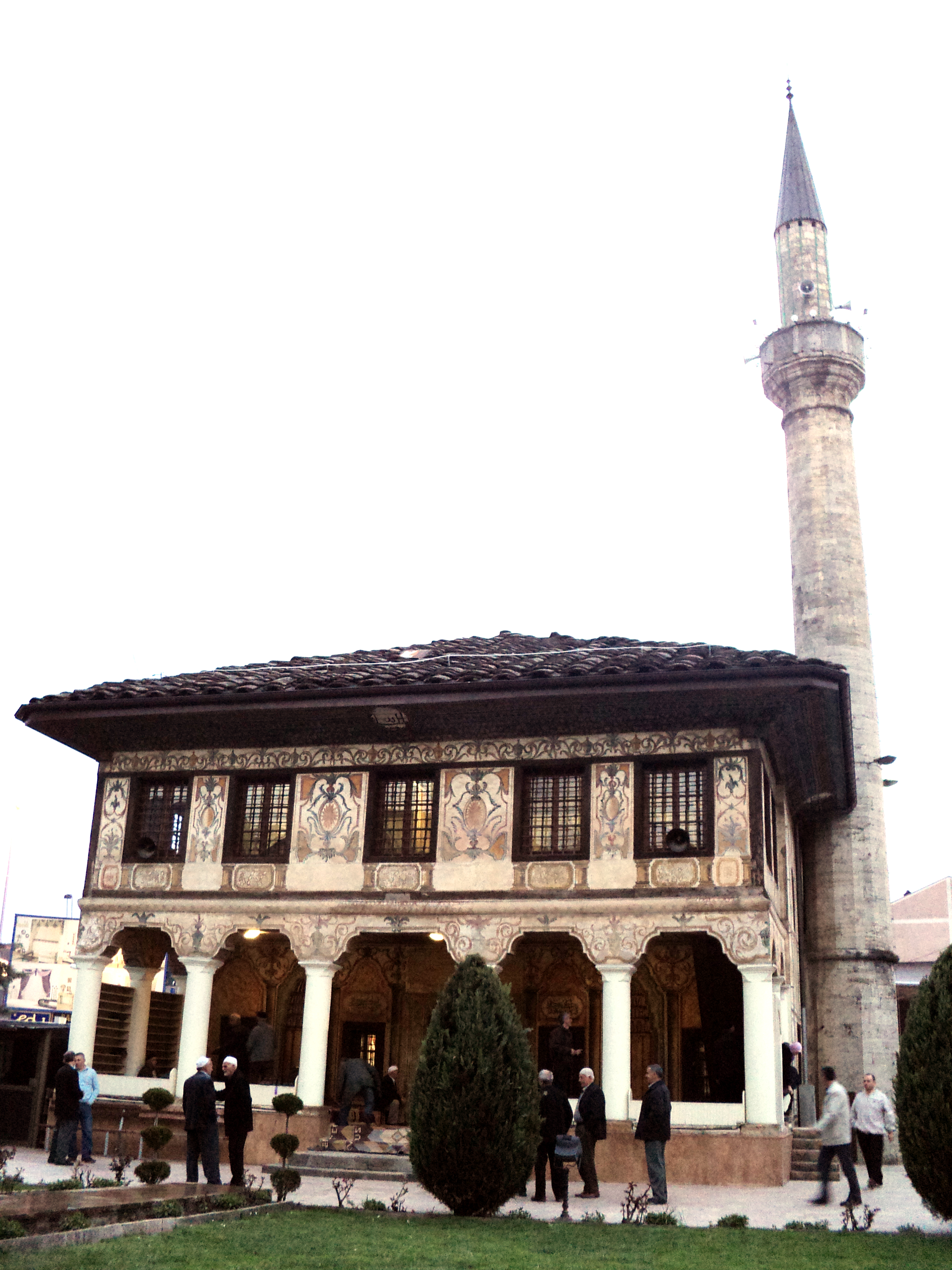

Religion
- Affiliation: Sunni Islam

Location
- Location: Tetovo, North Macedonia
- Interactive map of Šarena Džamija; Xhamija e Pashës; Alaca Camii; Painted Mosque
- Coordinates: 42°0′21″N 20°58′0″E

Architecture
- Architect: Isak Bey
- Type: Mosque
- Style: Ottoman Architecture
- Completed: 1438; 588 years ago

Specifications
- Length: 10 m (33 ft)
- Width: 10 m (33 ft)
- Minaret: 1
- Materials: Natural stones and colours

Šarena Džamija, (Macedonian: Шарена Џамија; Albanian: Xhamia e Larme or Albanian: Xhamia e Pashës; Turkish: Alaca Cami) meaning Decorated Mosque in English but also variably translated as Painted Mosque, is a mosque located near the Pena River in Tetovo, North Macedonia. The mosque was originally built in 1438 and later rebuilt in 1833 by Abdurrahman Pasha. Unlike other mosques of the Classical Ottoman period, the Šarena Mosque is more characteristic of traditional mosques in Anatolia, as it was constructed before the conquest of Constantinople, when Byzantine-influenced mosque domes became the standard design.

== History ==
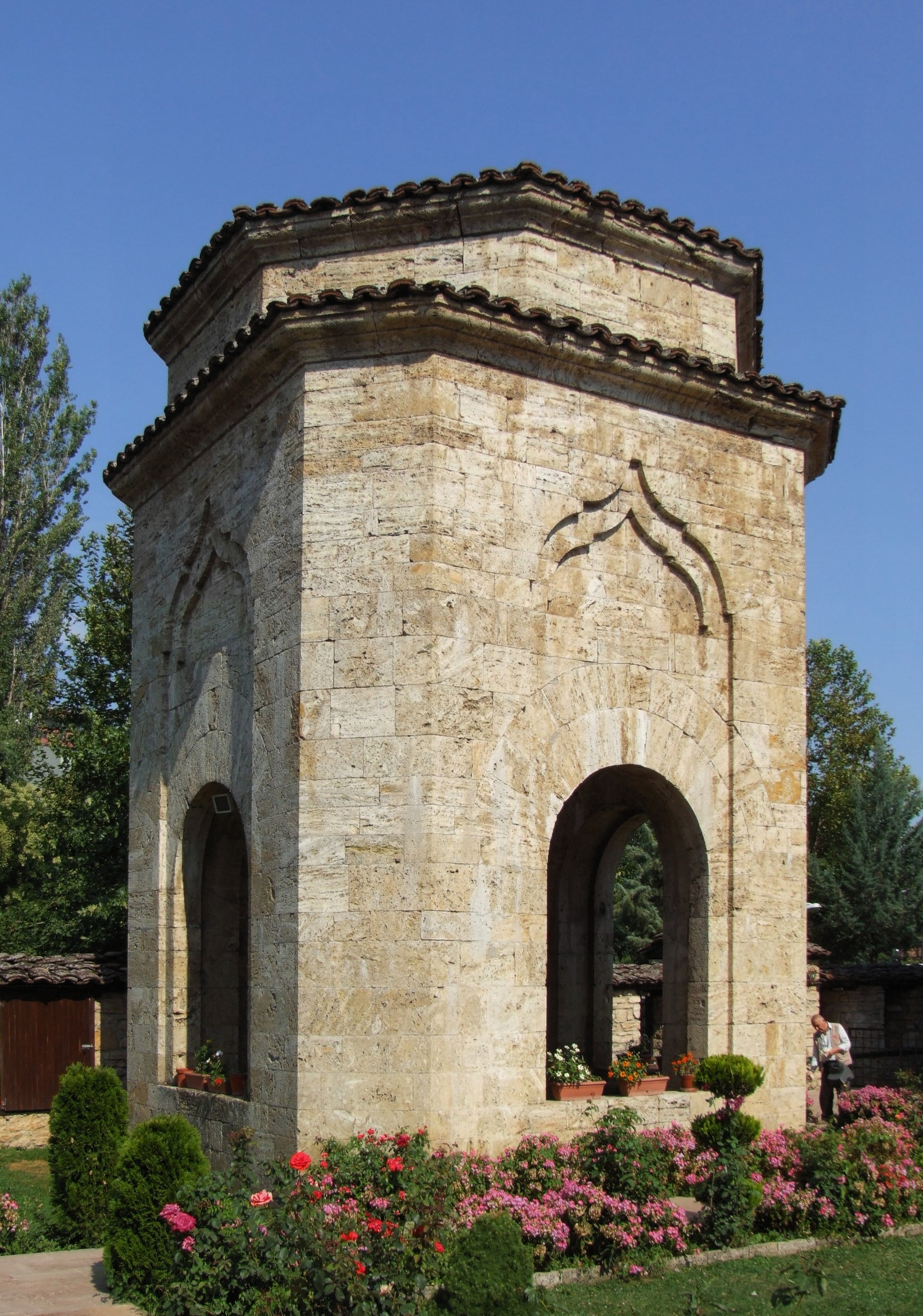
Türbe near the Colored Mosque

The Šarena Džamija was originally built in 1438. The architect behind the Šarena Džamija was Isak Bey.

Most mosques of the time had sultans, beys or pashas financing their constructions, but the Šarena Džamija, however, was financed by two sisters from Tetovo. As with many mosques, a hammam was built nearby across the river.

The site used to include an Inn as well as a bathhouse on the other side of the river. The current courtyard of the Šarena Džamija is filled with many flowers, a fountain, and a Türbe. The octagonal "türbe" houses the resting places of Hurshida and Mensure, the two sisters who financed the construction of the mosque in 1438.

Abdurrahman Pasha, a great enthusiast of art who was fond of Tetovo, reconstructed the Šarena Džamija in 1833.

In 1991, the Islamic Community in Tetovo built walls around the mosque in the typical classical Ottoman style.

In 2010, a renovation of the exterior paintings was completed and, with a €94,700 grant from the United States State Department, the façade was reconstructed and preserved in 2011.

== Architecture ==
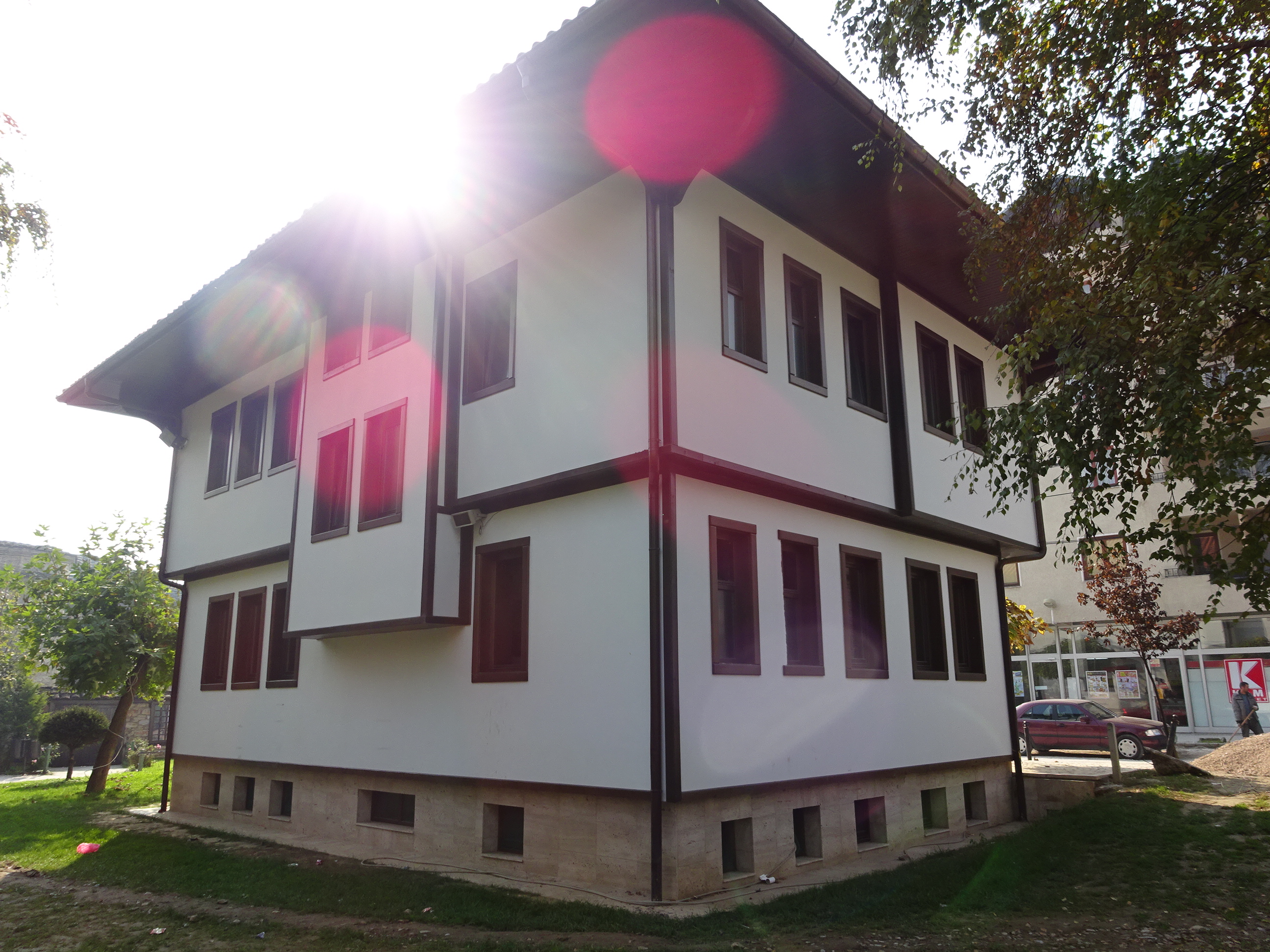
The Medresa with-in the complex of the decorated mosque

Unlike the traditional Ottoman ceramic tile decorations in mosques, the Šarena Džamija has bright floral paintings.

More than 30,000 eggs were used to prepare the paint and glaze that went into the elaborate decorations. Another major difference between the Šarena Džamija and other Ottoman mosques is that the Šarena Džamija does not have a distinctive exterior dome, as the architecture of the mosques styles the early Constantinople Ottoman Architecture.

The distinguishing feature of the mosque is its painted decorations. Abdurrahman Pasha commissioned, for this purpose, masters from Debar who painted the ornamentation with oil paints. In addition to the geometric and floral ornamentation, landscape is also encountered. Among the pictorial decorations, especially attractive is the depiction of Mecca, a rare and perhaps the only example of the illustration of the shrine of the Islamic prophet, Muhammad, in southeast Europe.

== Gallery ==
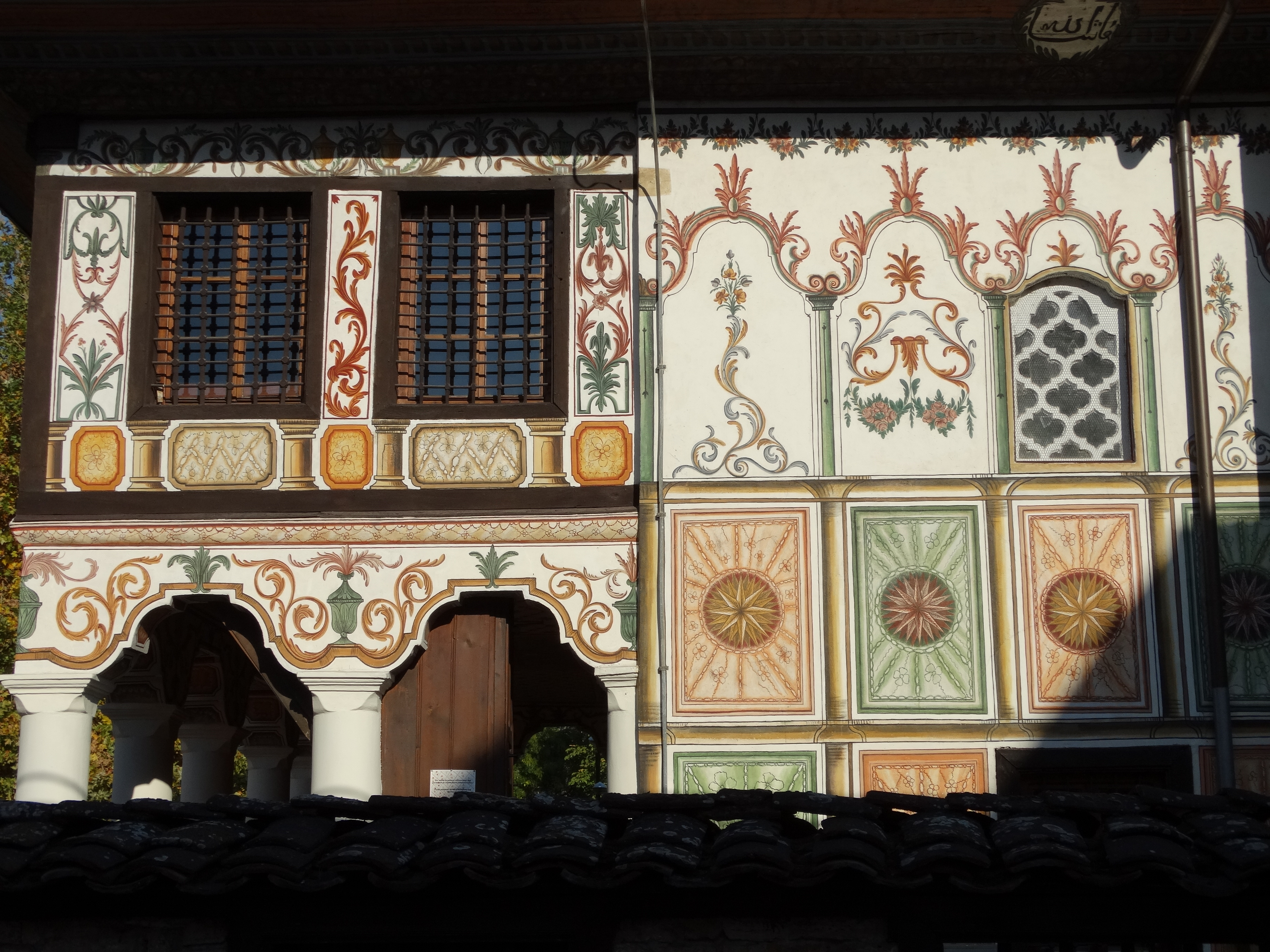
Details of the painted walls of the Šarena Džamija.

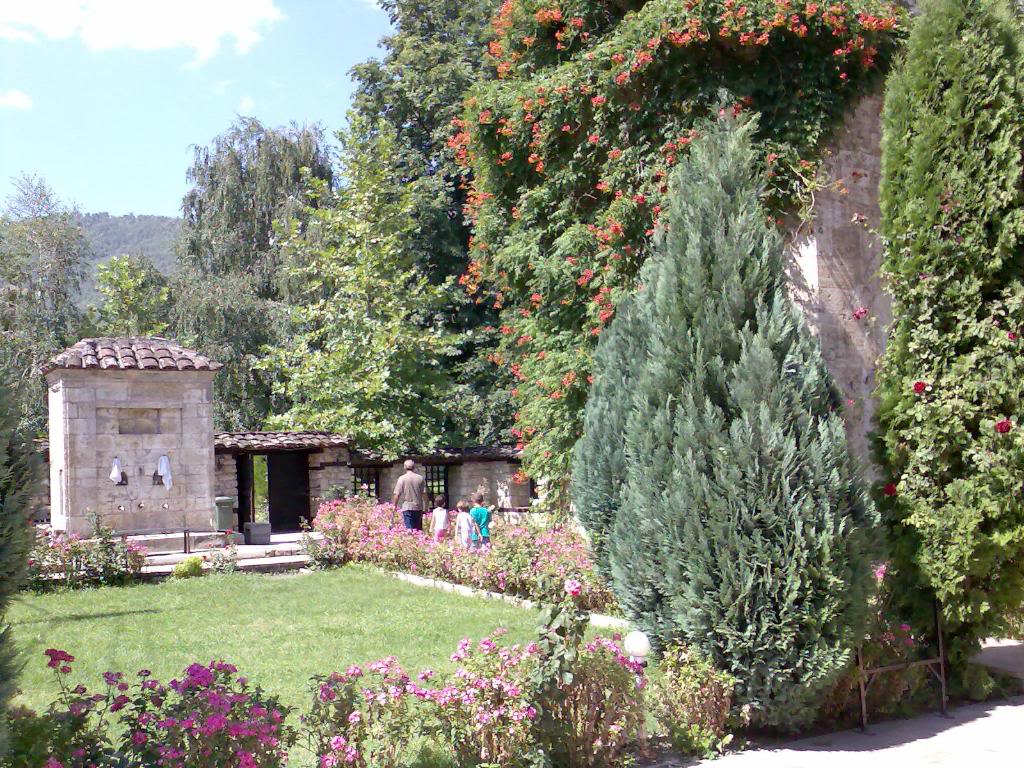
Courtyard.

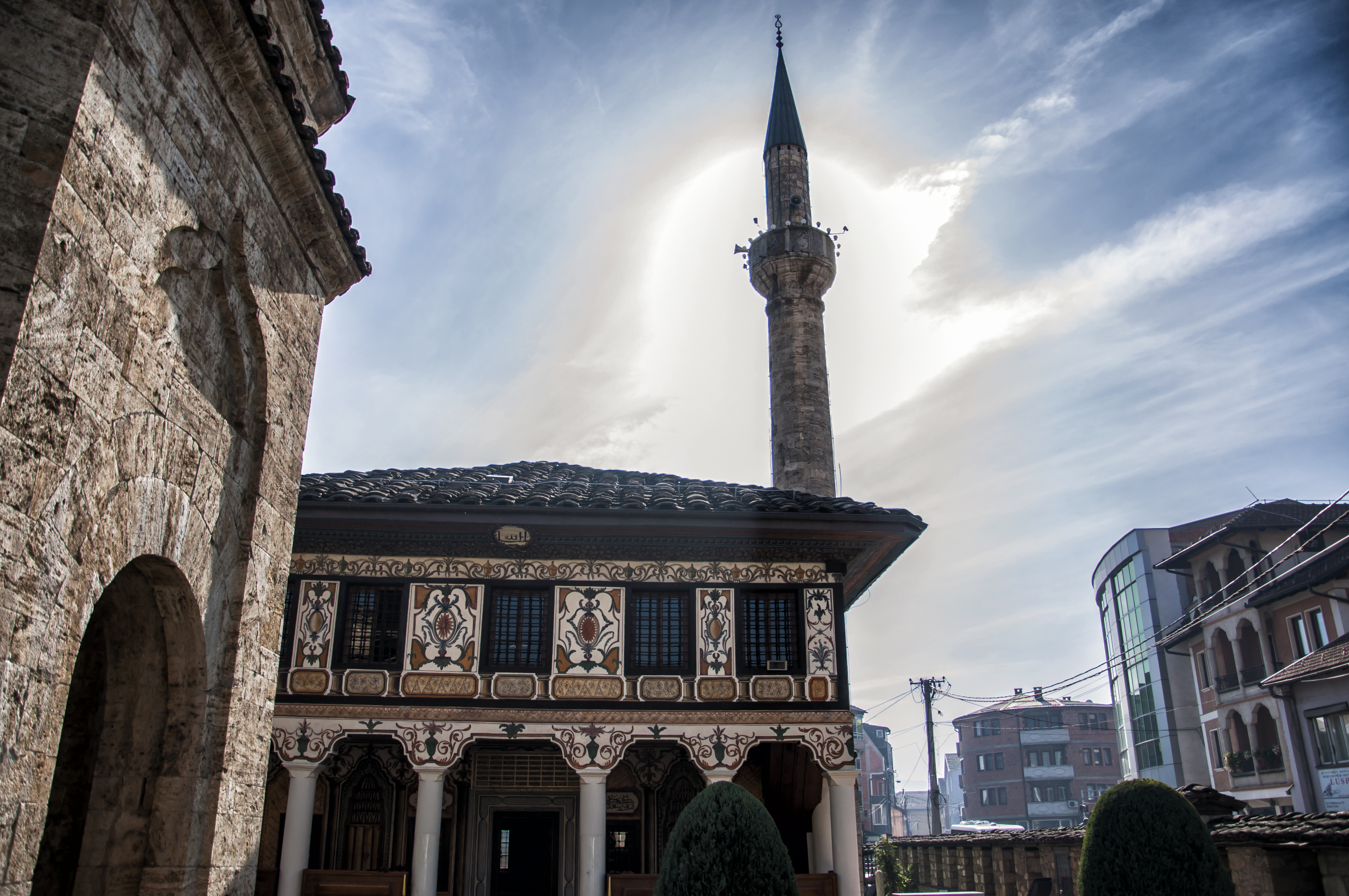
Šarena Džamija.

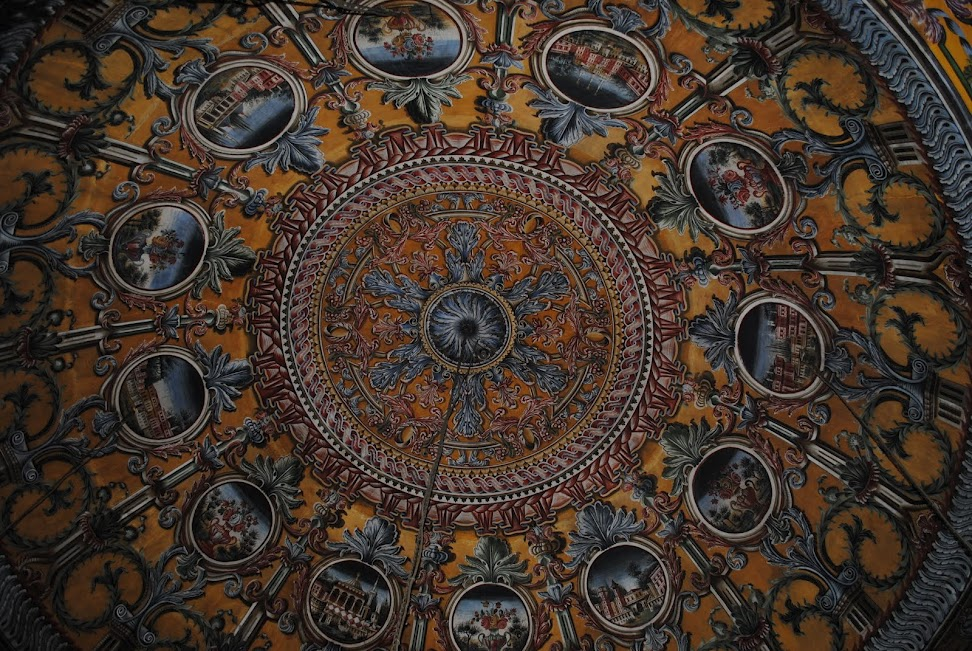
The interior of the Šarena Džamija.

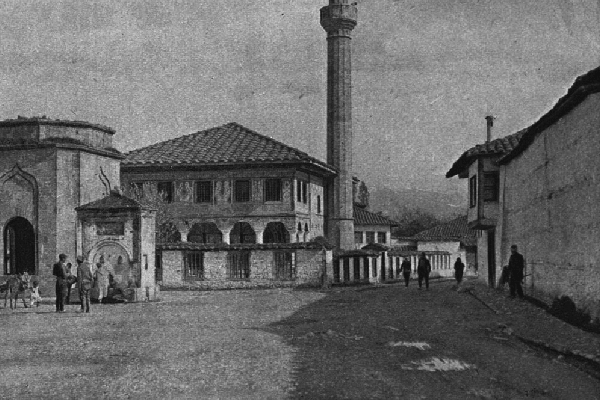
Šarena Džamija.

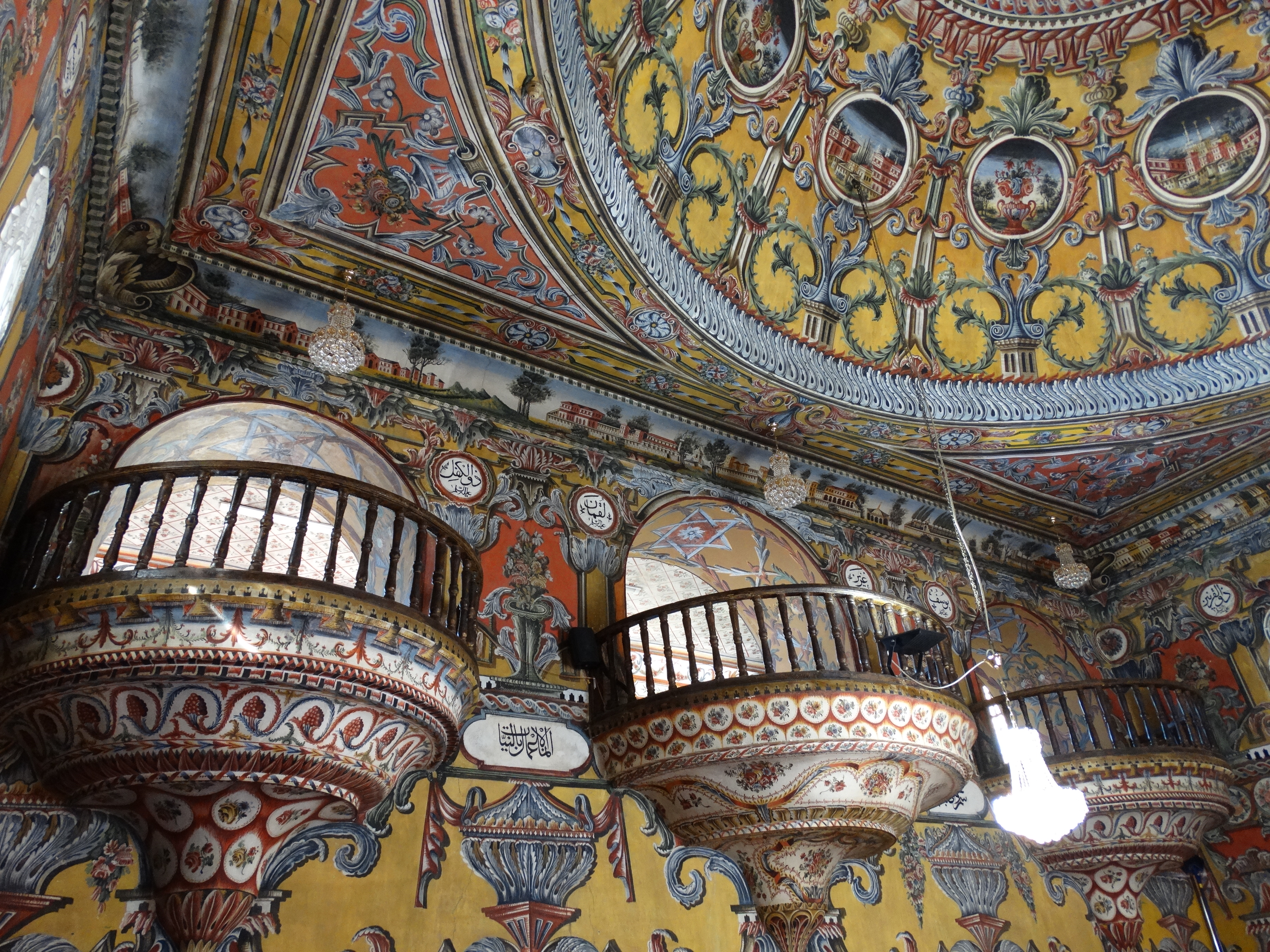
The interior of the Šarena Džamija.

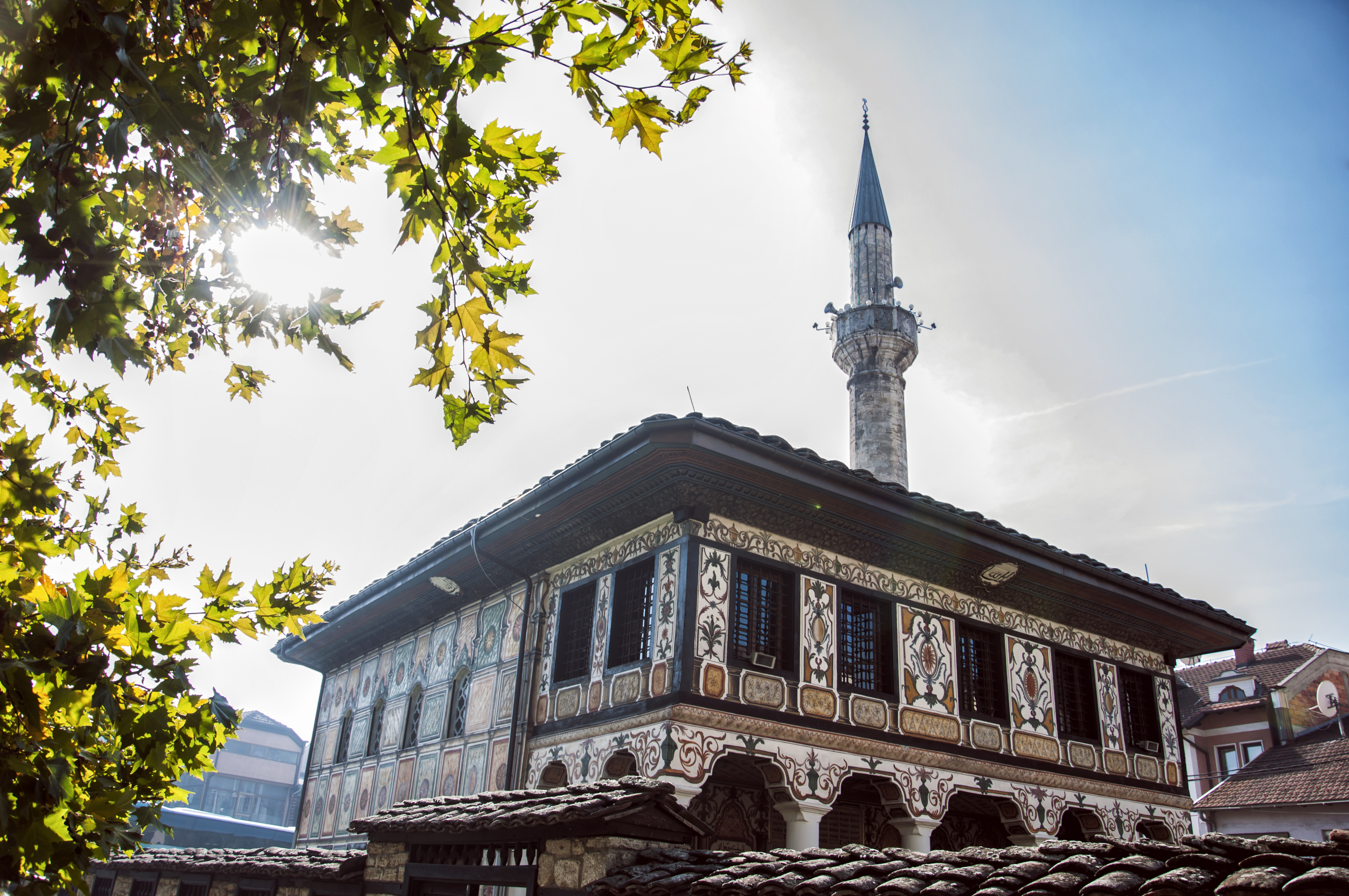
Šarena Džamija.

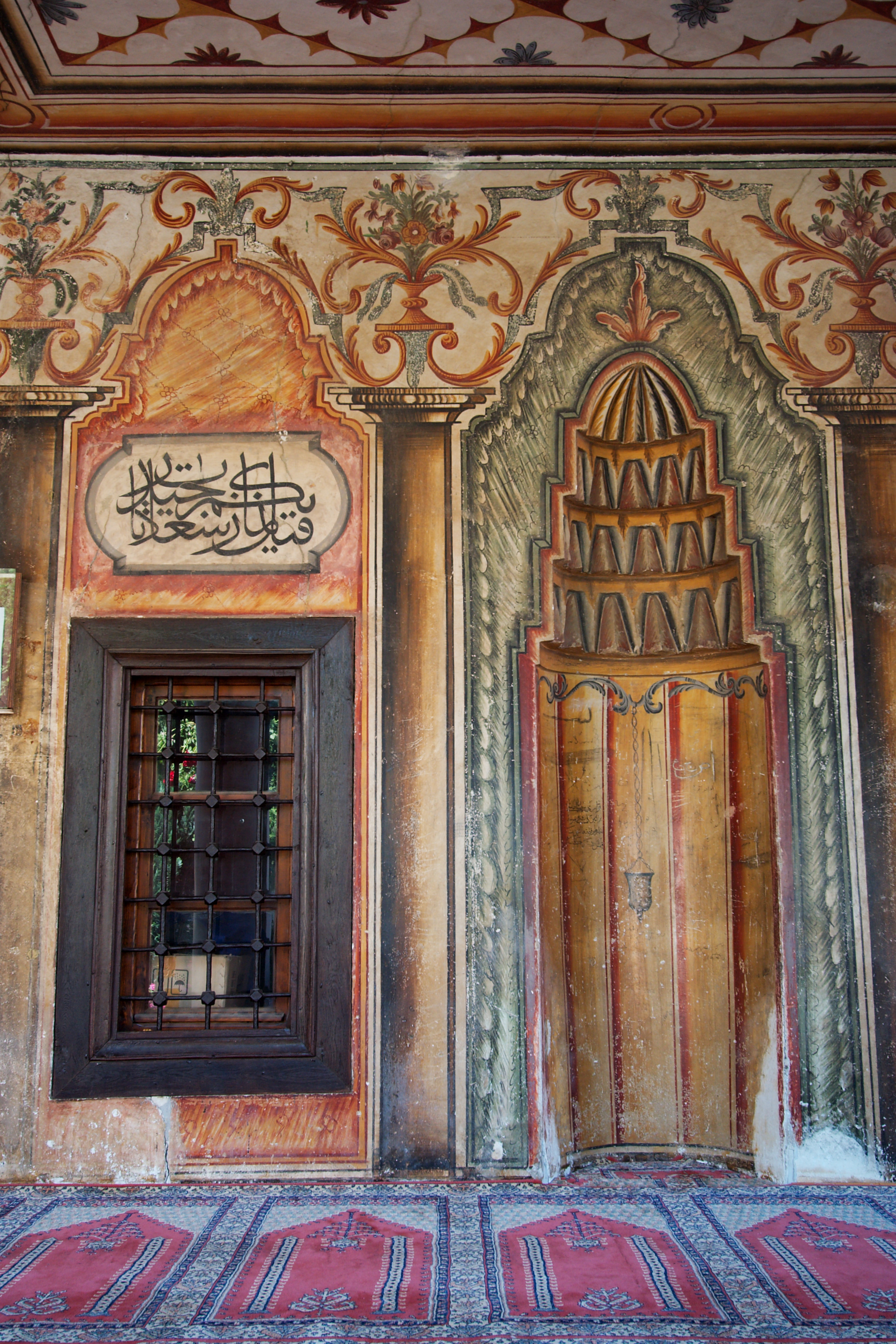
Mihrab.

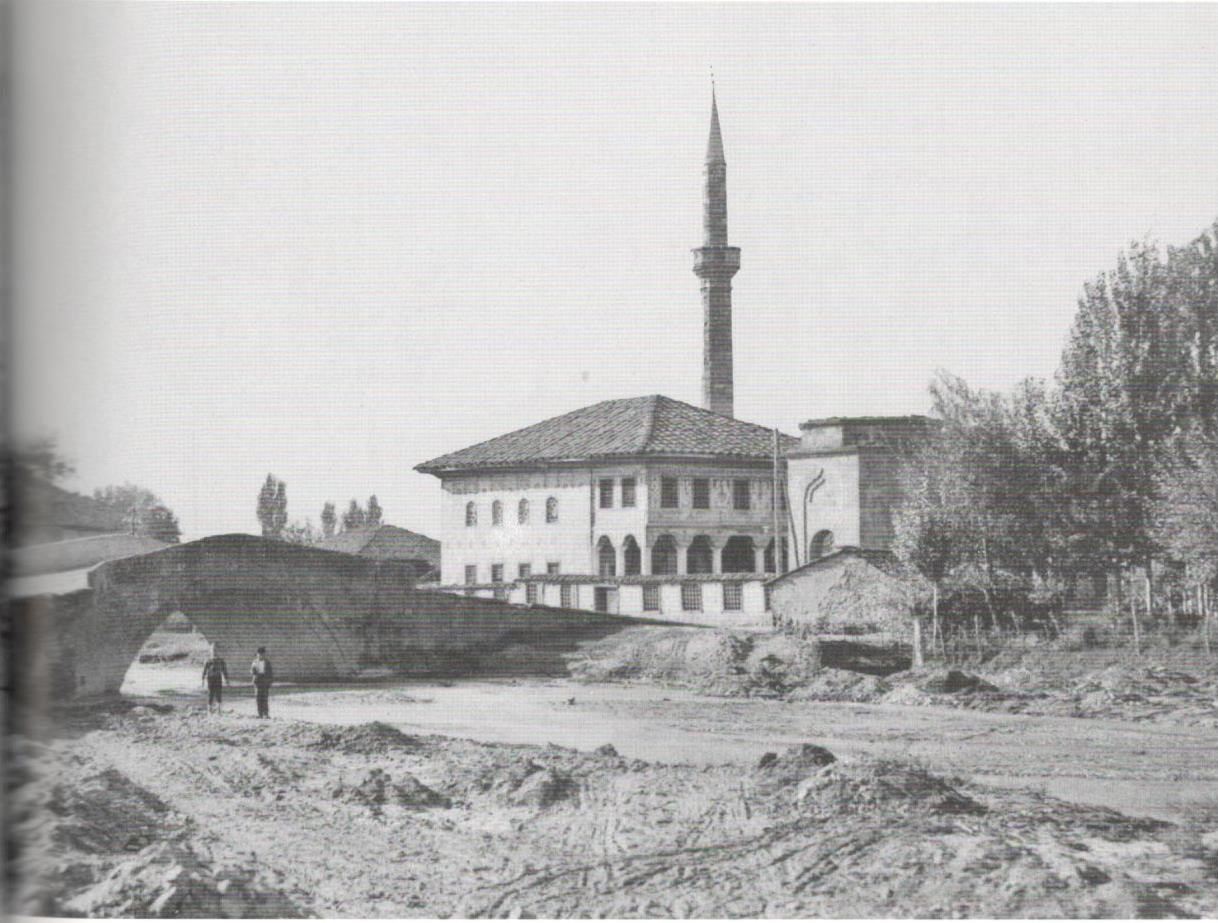
Šarena Džamija in 1932.

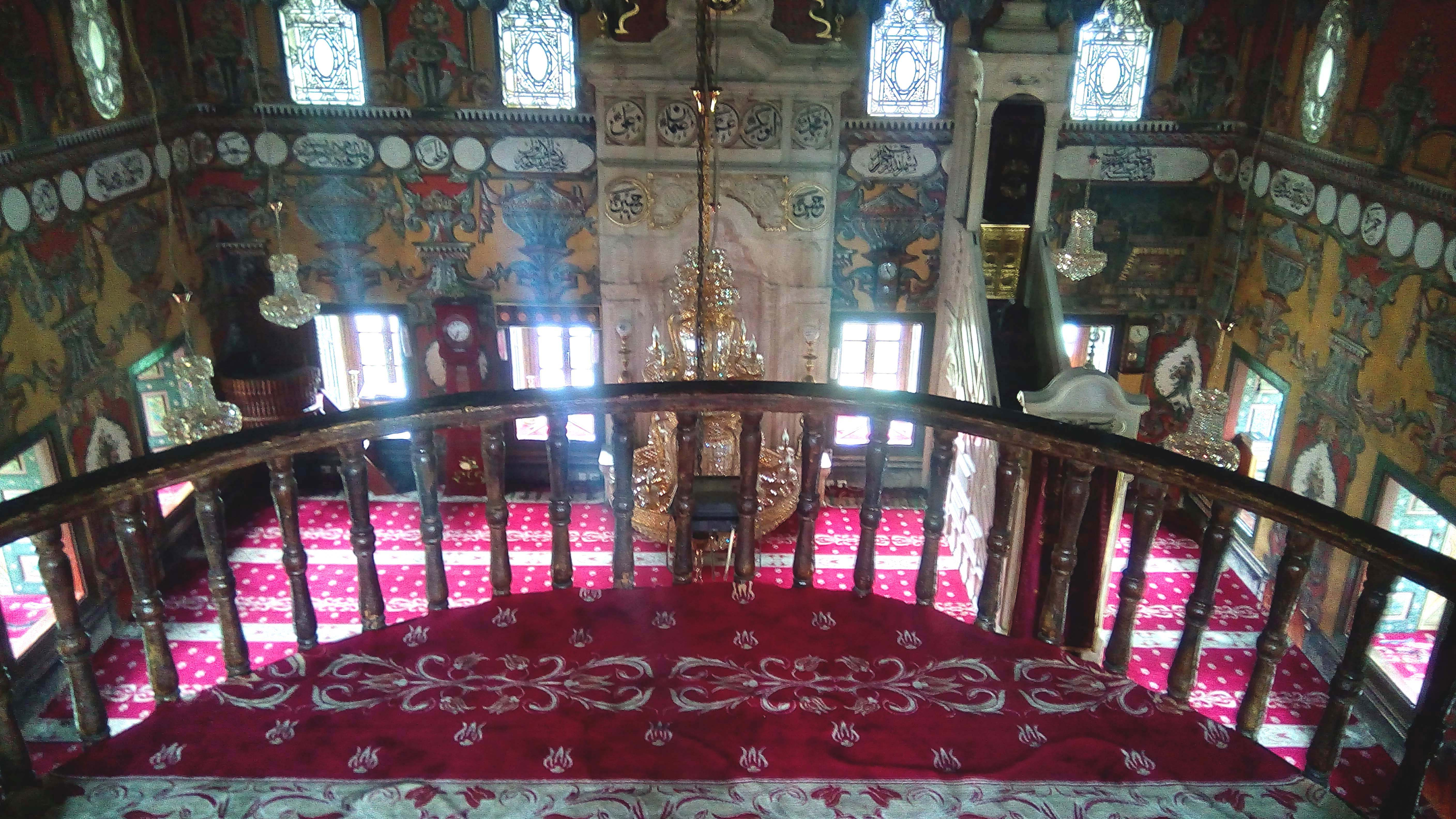
Inside the Šarena Džamija.
