= Gajre =

- Village
- Гајре
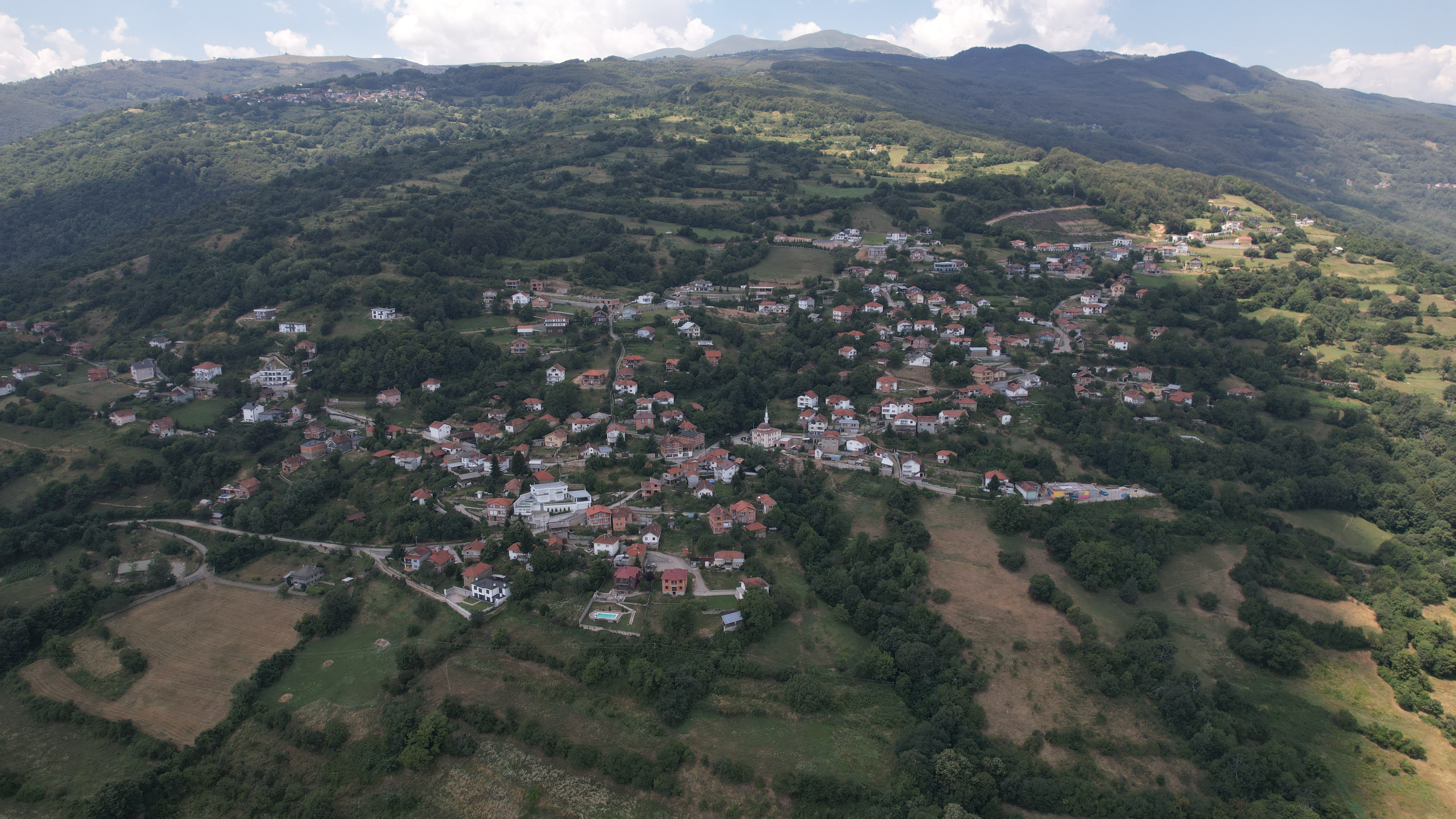
- Air view of the village

- Location within North Macedonia
- Coordinates: 42°01′N 20°57′E
- Country: North Macedonia
- Region: Polog
- Municipality: Tetovo

Population (2021)
  - Total: 633
- Time zone: UTC+1 (CET)
  - Summer (DST): UTC+2 (CEST)
- Car plates: TE
- Website: .

Gajre (Macedonian: Гајре, Albanian: Gajre) is a village in the municipality of Tetovo, North Macedonia.

== History ==
Gajre is attested in the 1467/68 Ottoman tax registry (defter) for the Nahiyah of Kalkandelen. The village had a total of 17 Christian households, 1 bachelor and 3 widows.

According to the 1467-68 Ottoman defter, Gajre (then known as Garje or Gara) exhibits largely Albanian anthroponomy. Due to Slavicisation, some families had a mixed Slav-Albanian anthroponomy - usually a Slavic first name and an Albanian last name or last names with Albanian patronyms and Slavic suffixes.

Five soldiers were killed near the village on June 5, 2001, by National Liberation Army insurgents, which was one of the heaviest death tolls for the government forces in a single incident during the 2001 insurgency in Macedonia.

== Demographics ==
According to the 2021 census, the village had a total of 633 inhabitants. Ethnic groups in the village include:

- Albanians 607
- Others 26

Year	Macedonian	Albanian	Turks	Romani	Vlachs	Serbs	Bosniaks	Others	Total
2002	6	1.009	...	...	...	1	...	4	1.020
2021	...	607	...	...	...	...	...	26	633

According to the 1942 Albanian census, Gajre was inhabited by 717 Muslim Albanians.

In statistics gathered by Vasil Kanchov in 1900, the village of Gajre was inhabited by 220 Muslim Albanians.
