= Jedoarce =

Jedoarce Једоарце Jedvarcë
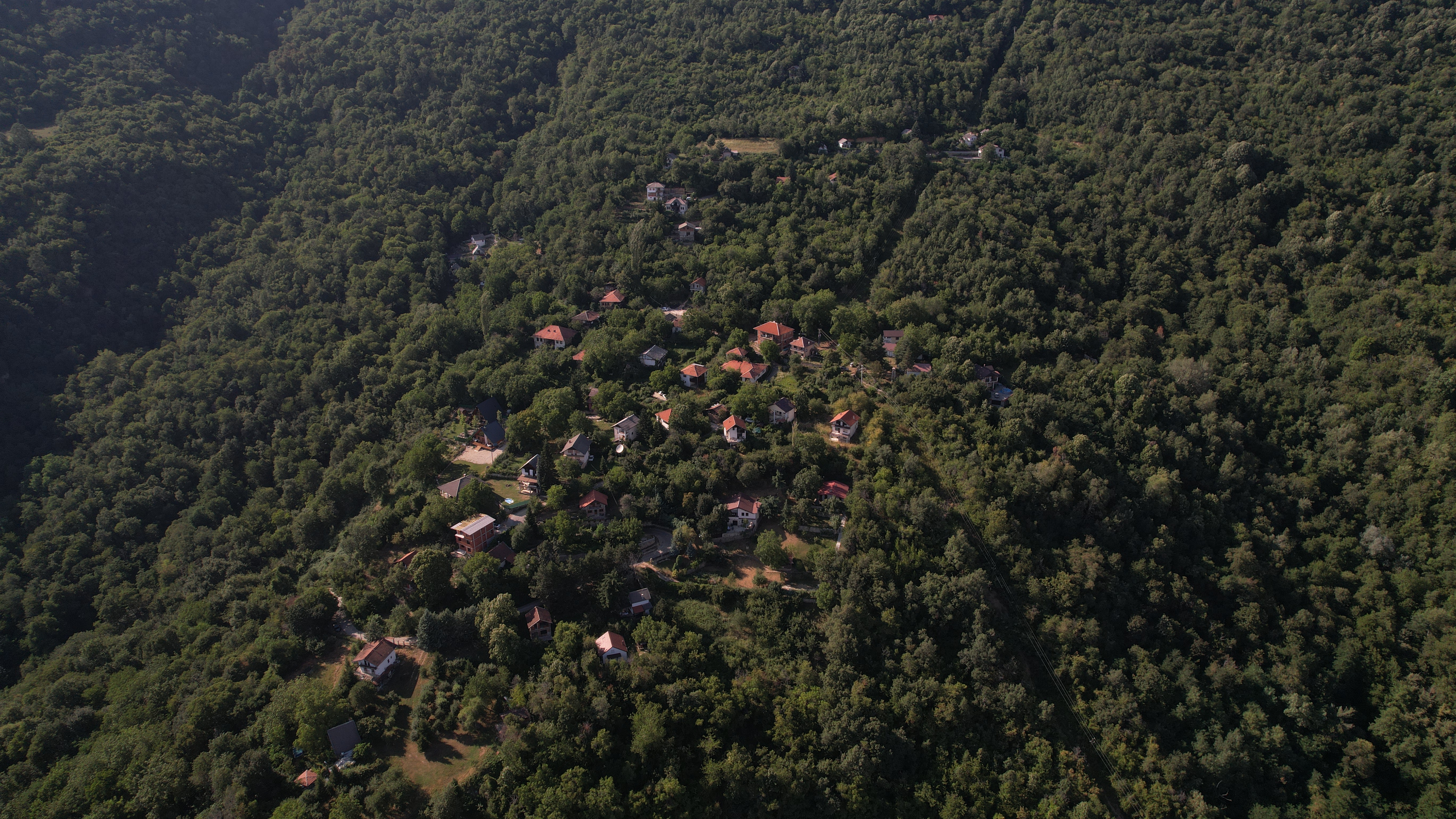
- Air view of the village

- Location within North Macedonia
- Coordinates: 42°2′53″N 21°0′1″E
- Country: North Macedonia
- Region: Polog
- Municipality: Tetovo

Population (2021)
  - Total: 16
- Climate: BSh

Jedoarce (Macedonian: Једоарце, Albanian: Jedvarcë) is a village in the municipality of Tetovo, North Macedonia.

== History ==
Jedoarce is attested in the 1467/68 Ottoman tax registry (defter) for the Nahiyah of Kalkandelen. The village had a total of 25 Christian households, two bachelors and two widows.

According to the 1942 Albanian census, Jedoarce was inhabited by 155 Bulgarians and 2 Muslim Albanians.

In statistics gathered by Vasil Kanchov in 1900, the village of Jedoarce (Edoarci) was inhabited by 85 Christian Bulgarians.

== Demographics ==
According to the national census of 2021, the village had a total of 16 inhabitants. Ethnic groups in the municipality include:

- Albanians: 11
- Macedonians: 5

Year	Macedonian	Albanian	Turks	Romani	Vlachs	Serbs	Bosniaks	Others	Total
2002	5	...	...	...	...	...	...	...	5
2021	5	11	...	...	...	...	...	...	16
