= Fališe =

Fališe Фалише
- Village
- Location within North Macedonia
- Coordinates: 41°58′48″N 21°3′0″E
- Country: North Macedonia
- Region: Polog
- Municipality: Tetovo
- Elevation: 430 m (1,410 ft)

Population (2021)
  - Total: 612
- Time zone: UTC+1 (CET)
  - Summer (DST): UTC+2 (CEST)

Fališe (Macedonian: Фалише) is a village in the municipality of Tetovo, North Macedonia.

== History ==
Fališe is attested in the 1467/68 Ottoman tax registry (defter) for the Nahiyah of Kalkandelen. The village had a total of 30 Christian households, 1 bachelor and 2 widows.

According to the 1467–68 Ottoman defter, Fališe exhibits a slight majority of anthroponyms belonging to the Orthodox Christian Slavic onomastic sphere, along with a sizeable minority of names which are characteristically Albanian.

According to the 1942 Albanian census, Fališe was inhabited by 112 Serbs, 79 Bulgarians and 9 Muslim Albanians.

== Demographics ==
According to the 2021 census, the village had a total of 612 inhabitants. Ethnic groups in the village include:

- Macedonians 552
- Albanians 37
- Serbs 5
- Others 18

| Year | Macedonian | Albanian | Turks | Romani | Vlachs | Serbs | Bosniaks | Others | Total |
|---|---|---|---|---|---|---|---|---|---|
| 2002 | 519 | 19 | ... | ... | ... | 7 | ... | 1 | 546 |
| 2021 | 552 | 37 | ... | ... | ... | 5 | ... | 18 | 612 |
