= Saraḱino =

Saraḱino Сараќино Saraqinë
- Village
- Location within North Macedonia
- Coordinates: 41°59′N 21°02′E
- Country: North Macedonia
- Region: Polog
- Municipality: Tetovo

Population (2021)
  - Total: 1,153
- Time zone: UTC+1 (CET)
  - Summer (DST): UTC+2 (CEST)
- Car plates: TE
- Website: .

Saraḱino (Macedonian: Сараќино, Albanian: Saraqinë) is a village in the municipality of Tetovo, North Macedonia.

== Demographics ==
Saraḱino is attested in the 1467/68 Ottoman tax registry (defter) for the Nahiyah of Kalkandelen. The village had a total of 13 Christian households and 1 widow.

According to the 2021 census, the village had a total of 1.153 inhabitants. Ethnic groups in the village include:

- Macedonians 791
- Albanians 277
- Romani 8
- Serbs 2
- Others 72

Year	Macedonian	Albanian	Turks	Romani	Vlachs	Serbs	Bosniaks	Others	Total
1953	506	...	...	19	...	34	...	...	559
1961	532	...	...	3	...	7	...	...	542
1971	483	35	...	2	...	12	...	2	534
1981	726	166	...	14	...	12	...	3	921
1994	765	182	...	...	...	7	...	1	955
2002	873	199	...	5	...	7	...	3	1.087
2021	791	277	...	8	...	2	...	72	1.153

According to the 1942 Albanian census, Saraḱino was inhabited by 331 Serbs. In statistics gathered by Vasil Kanchov in 1900, the village of Saraḱino (Sarakinci) was inhabited by 210 Christian Bulgarians.
