= Vešala =

Vešala Вeшaлa Veshallë
- Village
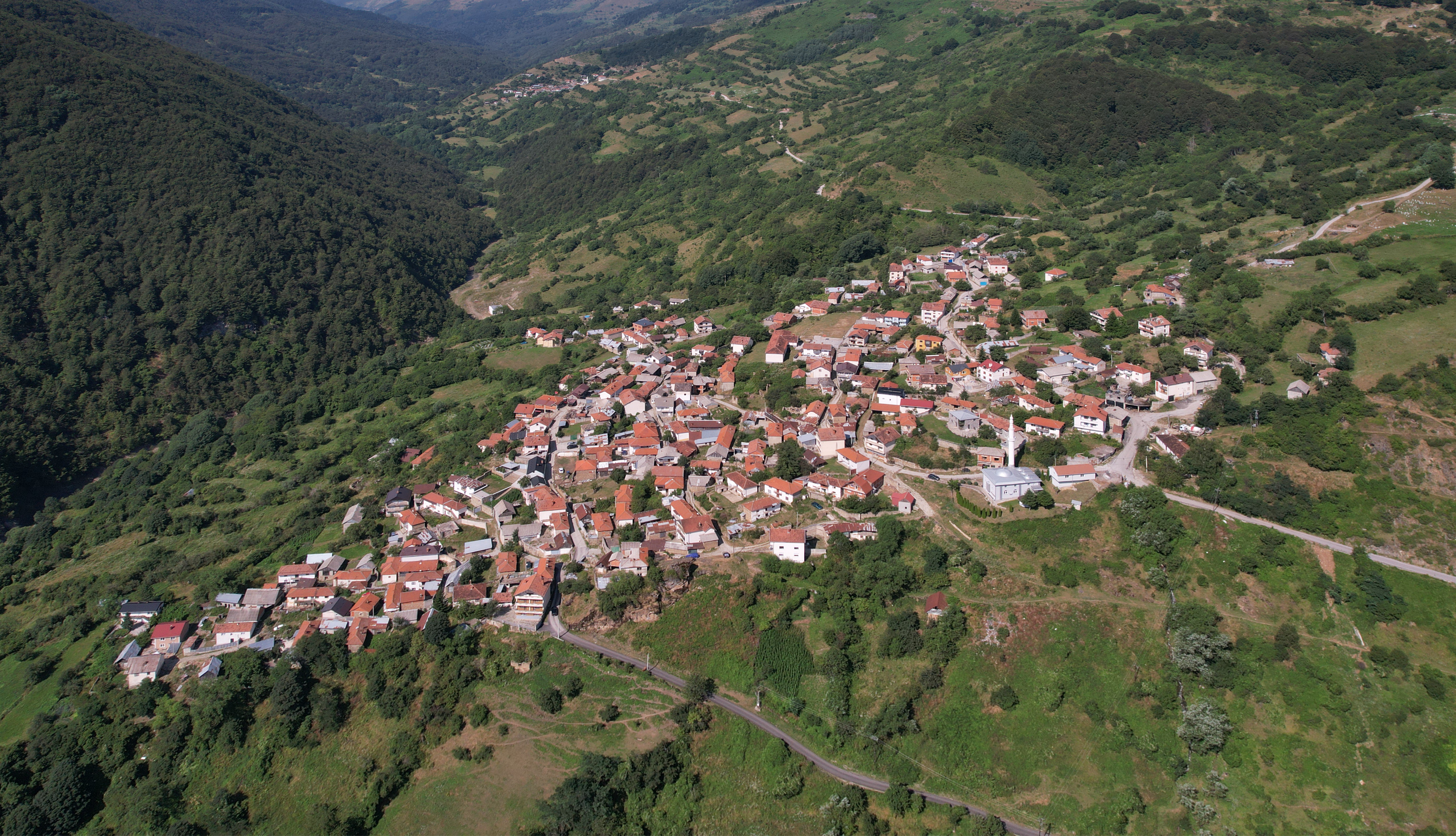
- Air view of the village

- Location within North Macedonia
- Coordinates: 42°04′N 20°51′E
- Country: North Macedonia
- Region: Polog
- Municipality: Tetovo

Population (2021)
  - Total: 291
- Time zone: UTC+1 (CET)
  - Summer (DST): UTC+2 (CEST)
- Car plates: TE
- Website: .

Vešala (Macedonian: Вeшaлa, Albanian: Veshallë) is a village in the municipality of Tetovo, North Macedonia. It is a village located in the Šar Mountains, some 11.9 kilometres away from the closest city Tetovo, 20 km away from Prizren and 1247 metres above sea level.

== History ==
According to the 1451-52 Ottoman defter, Vešala appears as being inhabited by 52 Christian households, which based on anthroponymy are all of Albanian origin.

The names include: Petro, son of Gjin, Istepan, son of Dimitri; Gjuro, son of Pelegrin; Nkola, his son (Pelegrin); Meksha, son of Gjura (Pelegrin); Gjin, son of Gjozilo; Liko, his son (Gjin), Dushko, his son (Gjin); Istanimir, son of Pelegrin; Dimitri, his son (Pelegrgrin); Pelegrin siromah (poor); Istepan, his son; Ivladislav, son of Dimitri (Pelegrin); Pop Radislav, Gjini his brother (of Pop Radislav); Dominiko, son of Dimitri; Ispanko, son of Petrushas; Lazor, his brother; Niko, his brother; Gjorgj (Gjergj), son of Gojani; Lazor, his son; Dimitri, his brother; Pavlo, son of Beristar ?; Petro, his son; Nikolla, his brother; Dimitri son of Tanush; Miho, his brother (Tanush); Miho, son of Luzo; Gjini star (old); Bogdan, his brother (Gjin) Dimitri his brother (Gjin); Gjorgji (Gjergji), his other son (of Gjin); Ivan, son of Gjin; Bogdan, his brother (of Ivan Gjin); Dimitri, son of Lazor; Nikolla, his brother; Petko, his brother (Lazor); Gjorgji (Gjergji), his brother (Lazor); Loresha, son of Dimitri; Nikolla, his son; Noka, son of Kaloq; Dimitri, his son; Relin, his other son (Kaloq); Petra, son of Gjurko; Zgur, his brother; Dimitri, his brother (Zgur); Bozhidari, his brother (Zgur); Shoq, son of Brajoslav; Dimitri, his brother (Shoq); Gjon, his brother (Shoq); Radislav, his brother (Shoq); Kojqin, his brother (Shoq). (Four blood-related brothers with two Slavic and two Christian names in kinship with Shoq).

Vešala is attested in the 1467/68 Ottoman tax registry (defter) for the Nahiyah of Kalkandelen. The village had a total of 70 Christian households and 4 bachelors.

Vešala in 1467-1468 had grown by 20 houses. But, as can be seen, the Slavicization of the anthroponymy of the Albanian household heads by the Slavic church had continued with the same intensity in the absence of Albanian priests. Out of 70 heads of families of Albanian ethnicity, 50 of them had lost their traditional Albanian patronymics-surnames and had adopted typically Slavic anthroponyms. In the second census, after 15 years, there were 20 heads of families still bearing characteristic Albanian patronymics, those being the following: Nikolla, Dimitri's son; Gjini, son of Dimitri; Petro, son of Gjon; Zguri, son of Gjorgj; Petko, son of Zgur; Todor, son of Gjin; Jovan, son of Gjin; Gjura, son of Gjin; Rala - Rela the son of Gjon; Stepan, son of Gjon; Gjuro, son of Gjin; Lika the son of Gjin; Dabzhiv, son of Gjin; Petri, son of Gjin; Tanush, son of Nikolla; Petri, son of Pavli; Lazor, son of Pavli; Gjon, son of Andre; Tanushi son of Andre.

In 1451-52, Radislavi and his brother Gjini, of Albanian descent, were registered in this settlement, while in 1467-68, Bozhidari, an Orthodox priest with his son-in-law Gjoni, of Albanian descent, was registered.

Vešala is home to some of the oldest Albanian clans within the Šar Mountains. Unlike the northern Albanian villages, Vešala was not isolated, being part of the old trade route, Prizren via Tetovo. According to the Nahiyah, the population of Vešala moved out and prospered under the Ottoman Empire, with many moving to Salonica and Marmara but still maintaining landownership in Vešala. This was a custom in Vešala as the Albanians were bounded to the village of their ancestor and could never permanently leave their home. This custom was referred to as Gurbet.

During the First World War, Serbian Royalists began invading Albania to seize the coast line. During the occupation, the Serbian army committed numerous crimes against the Albanian population. After the Treaty of London and the French never arriving to pick up the troops from the coast, the Royalists began to retreat through the mountains (Albanska golgota). A battalion of 37 Royalist approached Vešala. As the Royalists had razed many of the villages to the ground during the occupation, the Albanians of Vešala, seeing the Royalists approaching from the bottom of the mountain, ambushed them. After bounding them, the Royalists were pushed off Guri Gjatë (Long rock), a natural landmark of the Šar Mountains, and plunged to their deaths.

According to the 1942 Albanian census, Vešala was inhabited by 823 Muslim Albanians.

In statistics gathered by Vasil Kanchov in 1900, the village of Vešala was inhabited by 440 Muslim Albanians.

During the insurgency in the Republic of Macedonia, Vešala along with most villages of the Šar Mountains acted as a supply base and safe zone for the NLA forces.

=== Today ===
The village of Vešala has about 280 houses with 2500 inhabitants. Many of the families from Vešala live in Switzerland and Germany. However, many of them return to Vešala during the summer.

== Demographics ==
According to the 2021 census, the village had a total of 291 inhabitants. Ethnic groups in the village include:

- Albanians 241
- Others 50

Year	Macedonian	Albanian	Turks	Romani	Vlachs	Serbs	Bosniaks	Others	Total
2002	...	1.207	...	...	...	...	...	15	1.222
2021	...	241	...	...	...	...	...	50	291
