= Džepčište =

Village in Tetovo, Polog, North Macedonia

Džepčište Џепчиште Xhepçisht
- Village
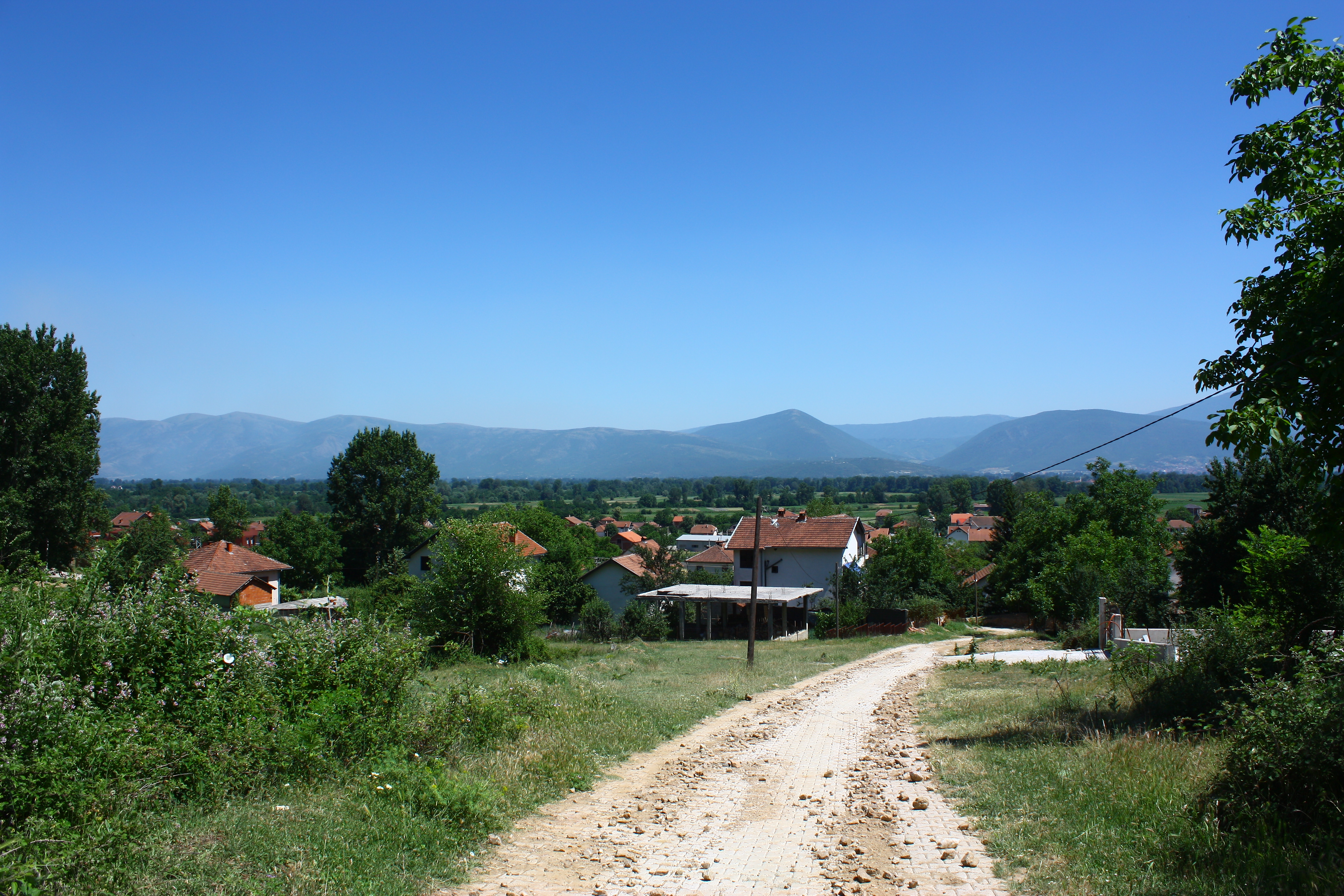

- Location within North Macedonia
- Coordinates: 42°02′N 21°00′E
- Country: North Macedonia
- Region: Polog
- Municipality: Tetovo

Population (2021)
  - Total: 3,338
- Time zone: UTC+1 (CET)
  - Summer (DST): UTC+2 (CEST)
- Car plates: TE
- Website: .

Džepčište (Macedonian: Џепчиште; Albanian: Xhepçisht) is a village in the municipality of Tetovo, North Macedonia.

== Geography ==
Džepčište is located at the range of Shar Mountain-Scardica, as well as in the field of Polog valley, characterized by relatively frosty winters as mountain stream climate prevailing during the long winter and warm and dry with temperatures reaching up to 45 degrees Celsius in the summer time for a Mediterranean climate. Overall, it has four seasons and fertile agricultural land and is known for the stable and very well-grown vegetables and local fruits.

== Demographics ==
Džepčište is attested in the 1467/68 Ottoman tax registry (defter) for the Nahiyah of Kalkandelen. The village had a total of 60 Christian households, 2 bachelors and 6 widows.

According to the statistical office of North Macedonia, Džepčište numbers about 760 residential homes. Approximately 700 of them are inhabited by Albanians and around 9 houses with ethnic Macedonians. Many individuals from this village live abroad, especially in European countries where they work and live, many with their families.

According to the 2021 census, the village had a total of 3,338 inhabitants. Ethnic groups in the village include:

- Albanians 3,198
- Macedonians 33
- Vlachs 1
- Turks 1
- Others 105

| Year | Macedonian | Albanian | Turks | Romani | Vlachs | Serbs | Bosniaks | Others | Total |
|---|---|---|---|---|---|---|---|---|---|
| 2002 | 19 | 3.934 | ... | ... | 1 | ... | ... | 35 | 4.051 |
| 2021 | 33 | 3.198 | 1 | ... | 1 | ... | ... | 105 | 3.338 |

According to the 1942 Albanian census, Džepčište was inhabited by 1,408 Muslim Albanians, 100 Bulgarians and 38 Serbs.

In statistics gathered by Vasil Kanchov in 1900, the village of Džepčište was inhabited by 385 Muslim Albanians and 80 Christian Bulgarians.

== Notable people ==
- Xheladin Murati - University professor
