= List of national parks of North Macedonia =

Overview of national parks in North Macedonia

There are four national parks in North Macedonia: Galičica National Park, Mavrovo National Park, Pelister National Park, and the Šar Planina National Park.

== List ==
Image	Name	Name origin	Type	Seat	Location	Area (km^{2})	Year	Symbol	Neighbouring national park
The interior of mountain Galičica	Galičica National Park	Galičica	Mountain range			227	1958		Prespa National Park (Albania)
Mavrovo Lake in autumn	Mavrovo National Park	Mavrovo	Village			780	1949		
Pelister Forest	Pelister National Park	Pelister	Mountain peak			171.15	1948		
	Šar Planina National Park	Šar Mountains	Mountain range				2021		Sharr Mountains National Park (Kosovo)

== See also ==
- Wildlife of North Macedonia
