= Wildlife of North Macedonia =

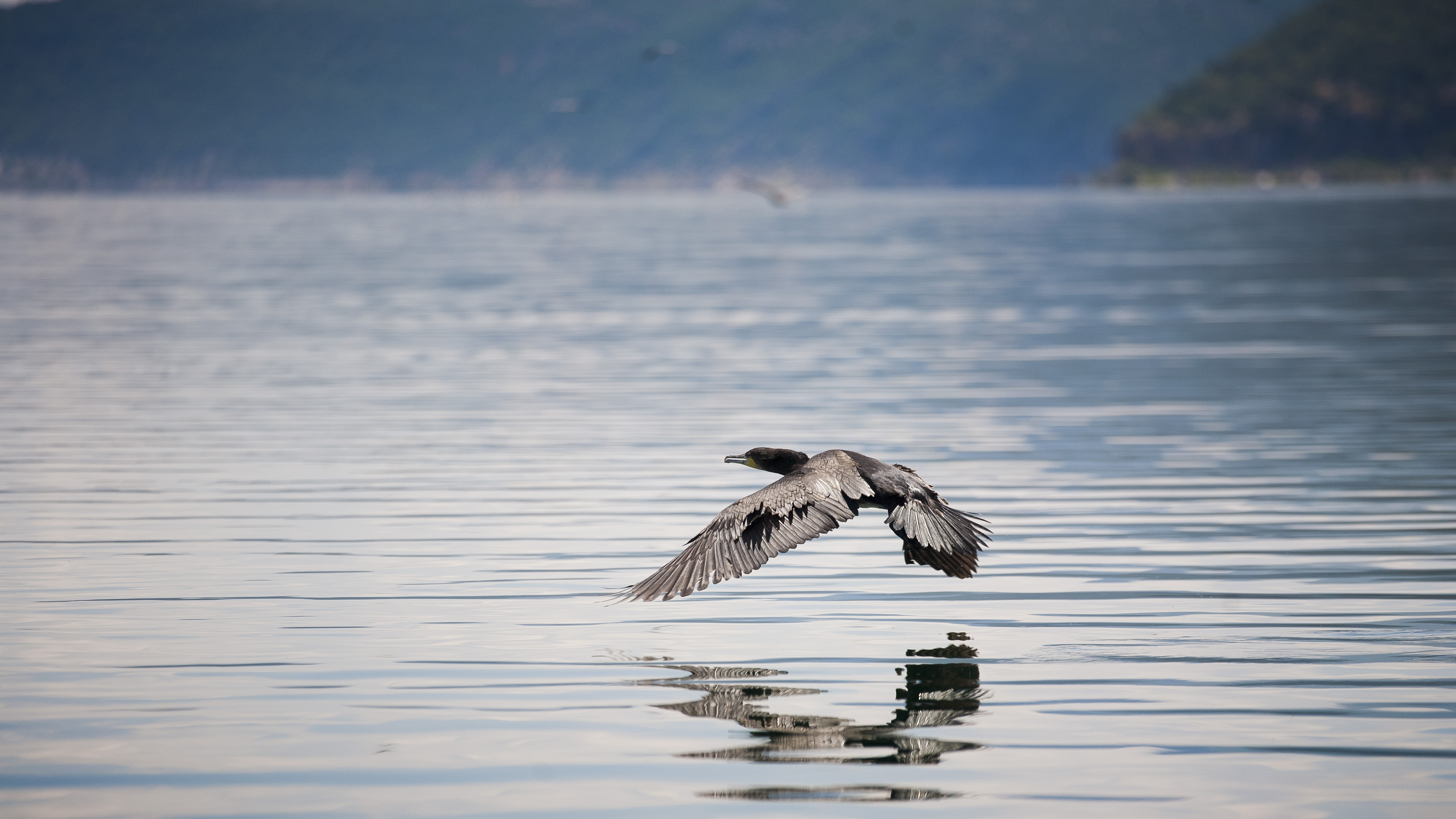
A cormorant in Galičica National Park

Over 22,500 species of wildlife have been recorded in North Macedonia. Over 10,000 of these are insects, which include 3,000 beetle species and large numbers of Lepidoptera, flies, and Hymenoptera. Aside from insects, other large arthropod groups include Chelicerata (mostly spiders) and crustaceans. Among vertebrates, more than 300 species of birds recorded, although not all nest in the country. There are over 80 species of both fish and mammals, 32 reptiles, and 14 amphibians.

Over 4,200 plants have been identified, of which more than 3,700 are vascular plants. The majority of existing forest is deciduous, and the amount of forest has expanded slightly in recent years. Over 2,000 species of algae have been found, most of them within lakes. There are also 2,000 species of identified fungi, with 90% of these being Basidiomycota, and at least 450 lichens.

The country covers 25,713 square kilometres (9,928 sq mi), with much of the terrain being mountainous. Significant variation in topography has contributed to large variation within local climates, which together with the presence of ice age refugia has resulted in significant diversity and endemism. Although North Macedonia is landlocked, it has numerous rivers and lakes supporting aquatic wildlife. The forest and caves in the west of the country support a number of unique and endangered animals. The three largest lakes, Lake Ohrid, Lake Prespa, and Lake Dojran, are further areas of relatively high diversity.

There is substantial interaction between people and wildlife, especially in rural areas. Various plant and fungi species are foraged for local use and for export, and many animal species are hunted. Other threats to wildlife include land use change, pollution, and climate change. A number of animal and plant species have become locally extinct. A variety of laws protect some species and habitats and regulate their use, and action plans have been developed by the government, covering topics including the environment, biodiversity, and water. Four national parks have been established, and North Macedonia is party to a number of European and International conventions that relate to wildlife and the environment.

== Environment ==
The Vardar river valley lies at the centre of North Macedonia, and much of the country is mountainous.

North Macedonia spans 25,713 square kilometres (9,928 sq mi) in the middle of the Balkan Peninsula. The landlocked country is centred around the Vardar river valley, with the national borders being marked by mountain ranges. Its diverse landscape creates a variety of local climates, which can be divided into eight biomes. The varied habitats of the country, including both natural and man-made environments, can be divided into 28 broad types, which are further subdivided into 120 at the third level of EUNIS classification. These are spread across 38 classes of landscapes.

The overall climate is temperate, with the area undergoing four seasons throughout the year. However, the varied geography means that there is significant local climatic variety. Precipitation also varies significantly. Up to 2 metres (6.6 ft) of snow can fall on some mountains.

North Macedonia contains 477 square kilometres (184 sq mi) of surface water. Its 35 rivers fall into three river basins, with one basin each flowing into the Aegean Sea, the Adriatic Sea, and the Black Sea. The majority of the country, 22.075 square kilometres (8.523 sq mi), falls within the Agean Basin, which contains Lake Dojran. 20.661 square kilometres (7.977 sq mi) of this basin is covered by the Vardar river and its tributaries. The remaining 1.649 square kilometres (0.637 sq mi) of the Aegean drainage basin is covered by the Strumica river and its tributaries. The main river of the 3.359 square kilometres (1.297 sq mi) Adriatic basin is Black Drim, which begins at Lake Ohrid. Lake Prespa also falls within this basin. Under some accounting there are also three minor drainage basins, which combined cover just over 1% of North Macedonia. Altogether, lakes cover 2% of the country, about 500 square kilometres (190 sq mi). The three large lakes mentioned above are tectonic lakes. Lake Ohrid is 348.8 square kilometres (134.7 sq mi), and has an average depth of 144.8 metres (475 ft). It is thought to be 2–3 million years old. Lake Prespa is 274 square kilometres (106 sq mi), with an average depth of 18.8 metres (62 ft). Lake Dojran is 43 square kilometres (17 sq mi), with a maximum depth of just 10 metres (33 ft). These three lakes are split between North Macedonia and neighbouring countries. Around 43 glacial lakes exist in the mountains. There are also 111 are artificial lakes, including large reservoirs.

A complex geological history means the country's surface rocks originate from many periods of Earth's history. There are 13 mountains whose heights exceed 2,000 metres (6,600 ft), with the highest being 2,753 metres (9,032 ft) above sea level. Around 50% of the country is considered mountainous, containing many gorges and valleys. Caves, especially in limestone mountains found in the west, support a variety of cave fauna, and contain their own lakes. Forests cover 9,888.35 square kilometres (3,817.91 sq mi) of the country, 90% of which is within state-owned land. Agricultural land covers 12,680 square kilometres (4,900 sq mi), including both actively used land and land that is able to be quickly cultivated. Pastures make up 757,000 of this agricultural land.

== Plants ==
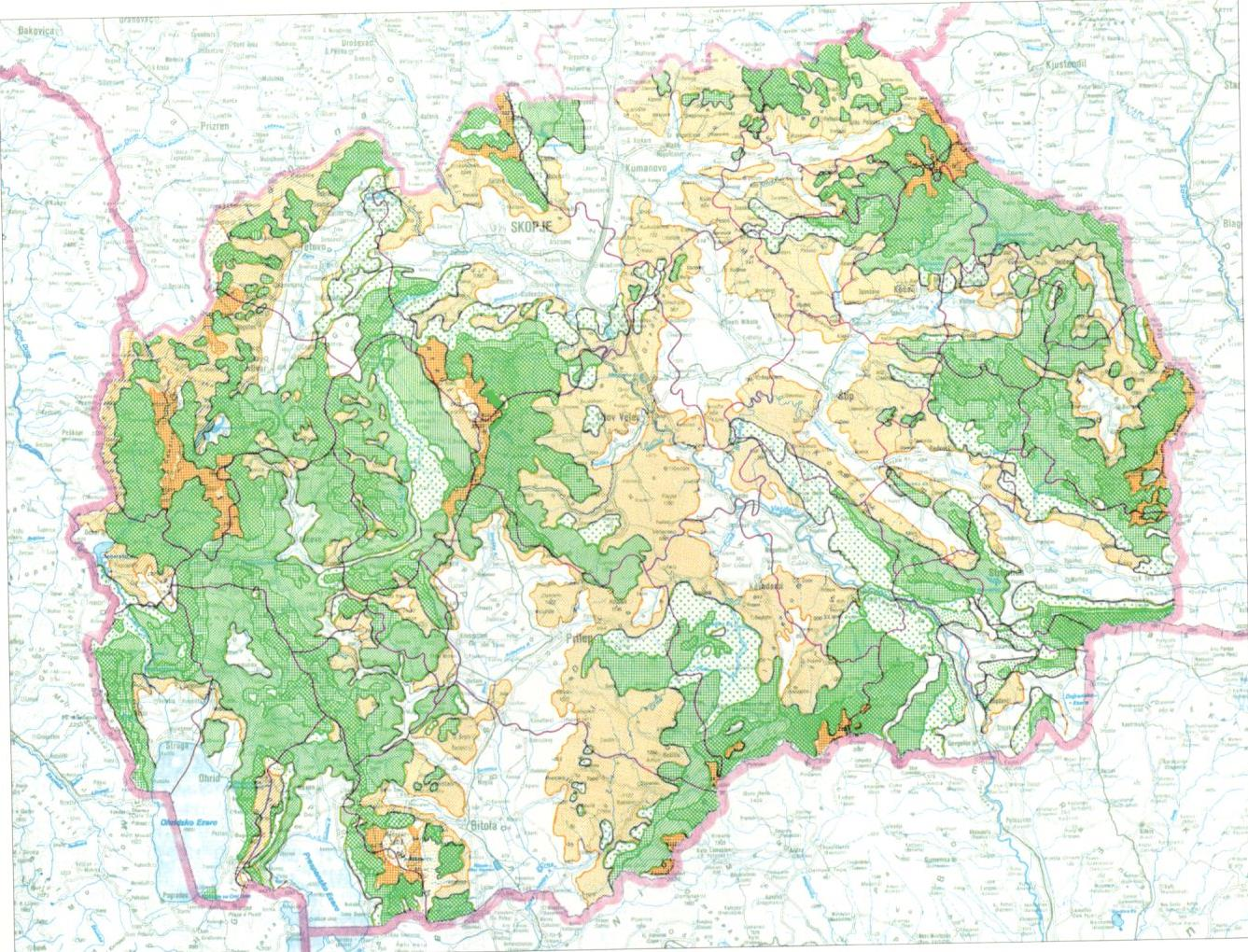
Forests cover much of the country

At least 3700 species of vascular plants have been identified in North Macedonia, of which 116 are endemic or near-endemic. 3200 of these are flowering plants. Additionally, there are 573 non-vascular plant species, none of which are endemic. Over 400 of these species are mosses, while 100 are liverworts.

The estimated wood mass in the country was 74,343,000 cubic metres (2.6254×10^{9} cu ft) in 2008. Forested land expanded by 3.5% in the decade leading up to 2013, reflecting a decrease in annual logging, deliberate efforts to expand forested area, and a reduction in livestock. This recovery is not shared by all forest types however, with coniferous and mixed forest coverage reducing in size. As of 2013, 58% of the forest was deciduous, 30% was mixed, 7% was coniferous, and 5% was considered degraded. Some deliberate forestation has been undertaken with the invasive Robinia pseudoacacia and Ailanthus altissima.

Broadleaf tree woodlands, dominated by alder, birch, poplar, and willow species, are some of the country's most endangered habitats. Swamp woodlands are dominated by Alnus glutinosa. Beech forests are dominated by oaks and beech species. Oaks, chestnuts, hophornbeams, and Carpinus orientalis dominate deciduous woodlands. Other habitats contain many conifer species.

314 species of flowering plants (11% of all flowering plants in the country) are protected. 14 species of vascular plants assessed by the United Nations Environment Programme are considered at a risk of extinction: four are critically endangered, five are endangered, and five are vulnerable. Eight moss species are protected. Only 11 Macedonian species appear in the Bern Convention, whereas five are listed in European Union Habitats Directive appendices.

Plant species that have become locally extinct in North Macedonia include Acorus calamus, Sagittaria sagittifolia, Lysimachia thyrsiflora, Aldrovanda vesiculosa, and Nymphaea alba. Others, such as Jacobaea paludosa, Ranunculus lingua, and Gentiana pneumonanthe, are near locally extinct if not extinct already. Carex elata is also on the brink of extinction.

== Fungi ==
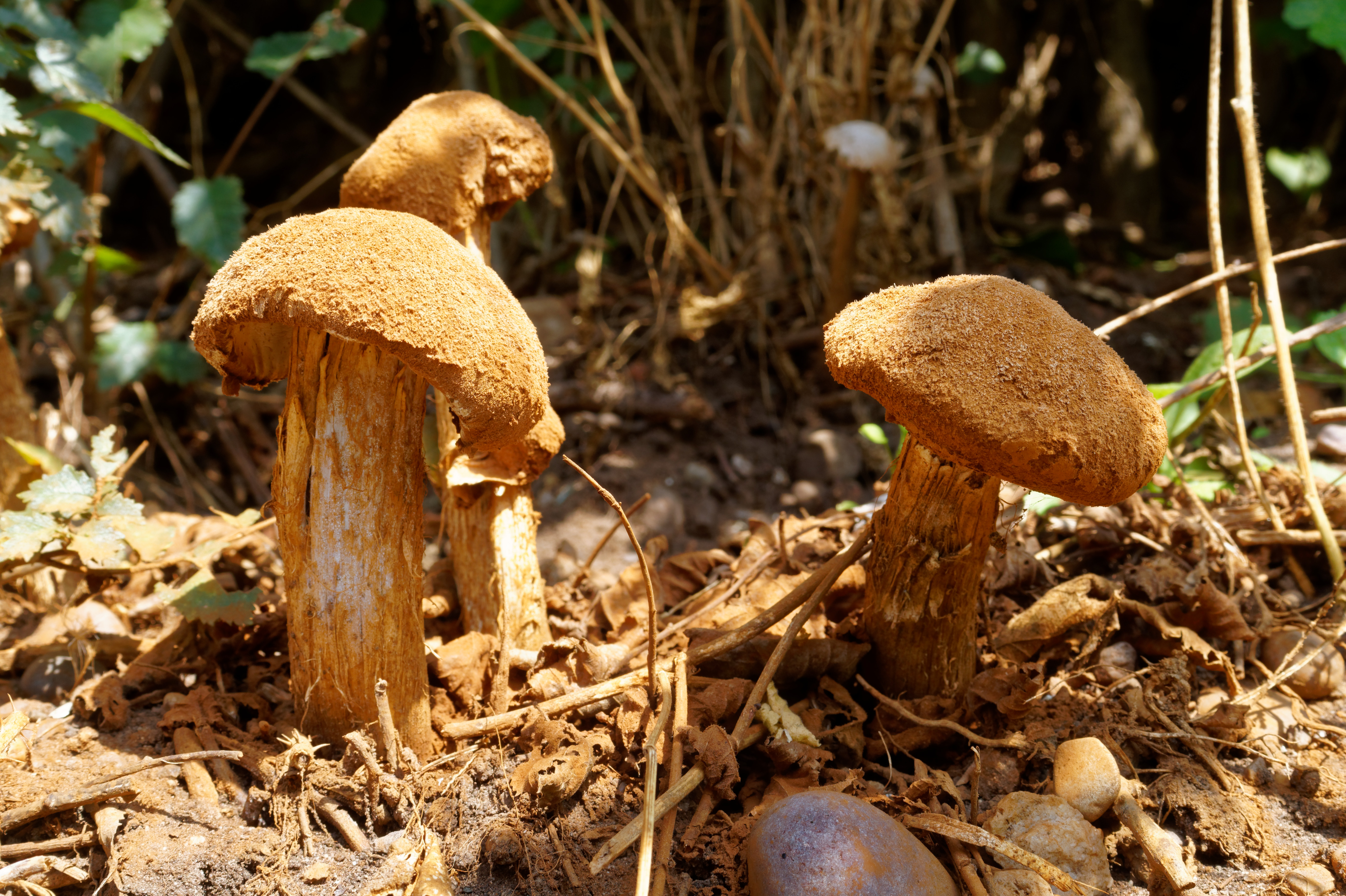
Battarrea phalloides, which is critically endangered in North Macedonia, has a significant population on the island of Golem Grad in Lake Prespa.

Of the 2000 identified fungi taxa in North Macedonia, none are endemic. Around 1800 belong to Basidiomycota (including 550 within Agaricales and 450 within Aphyllophorales), while 200 species are Ascomycota. In addition, at least 450 species of lichens have been identified. Entomophaga maimaiga, an entomopathogenic fungus, is found on gypsy moths, following its introduction in neighbouring Bulgaria as a way to control the moth.

So far, 122 species have been identified as threatened, and 213 species from the ascomycetes and basidiomycetes have been preliminarily assessed for IUCN Red List status. Of these, 21 were critically endangered, 30 endangered, 71 vulnerable, 40 near threatened, 9 least concern, and 42 data deficient. Ten of the critically endangered species have been found in just a single location.

== Animals ==
=== Invertebrates ===
Invertebrate species identified as of 2014
Phylum	Species
Acanthocephala	8
Annelida	175
Arthropoda	11849
Cnidaria	3
Mollusca	320
Nematoda	870
Nematomorpha	2
Nemertea	1
Platyhelminthes	229
Porifera	10
Rotifera	269

There are 13,493 recorded invertebrate species in North Macedonia. The vast majority of these (90%) are arthropods. 6 of the 10 sponges found in the three major lakes are endemic. Eunapius carteri dojranensis is endemic to Lake Doyran. Ochridaspongia rotunda, Ochridospongia interlithonis, Ochridospongilla stankovici, and Spongilla stankovici are endemic to Lake Ohrid. Spongilla prespensis is endemic to Lake Prespa. Of the three Cnidaria species, one is invasive. The 229 flatworms are made up of 158 Neodermata and 71 Turbellaria. The two known Nematomorpha species known are Gordius nonmaculatus and Gordius aquaticus. The only known Nemertea species is Prostoma graecense, which was found in Lake Ohrid. Annelids consist of 140 Oligochaeta, 30 leeches, and 5 Branchiobdellida. 53 of the 180 identified annelids species are endemic, all in Lake Ohrid. 38 of these endemic species are oligochaetes, and 11 are Hirudinea.

There are at least 870 nematode species, including 450 forest-dwelling species, 80 plant parasites, and many living in lakes. The Mollusca species represented are mostly Gastropoda, which have 301 species. At least 195 of these are land snails, and 107 are aquatic snails. The remaining 19 mollusc species are Bivalvia. Of 92 molluscs considered endemic, 88 of them are gastropods and four of them are bivalves. One gastropod species in Lake Prespa is invasive.

==== Arthropods ====
At least 11,800 arthropod species have been identified. Of the 1126 Chelicerata species present, at least 60 are considered endemic. The most numerous order within Chelicerata is that of spiders, of which there are 767 species (nine of which are endemic). The next largest taxa is the Acari, whose 250 species include 164 Hydrachnidia and four Halacaridae. Within Halacroidea, the monotypic Stygohalacarus genus, represented by Stygohalacarus scupiensis, is endemic to North Macedonia, as is Copidognathus profundus. The fen raft spider, living in marshes near Mount Belasica, is known to eat fish. The remaining identified Cherlicerata species are 54 pseudoscorpions, 50 opiliones, three scorpions, and two Solifugae (Galeodes elegans and Galeodes graceus). 19 Opiliones are endemic, along with 16 pseudoscorpions.

===== Insects =====
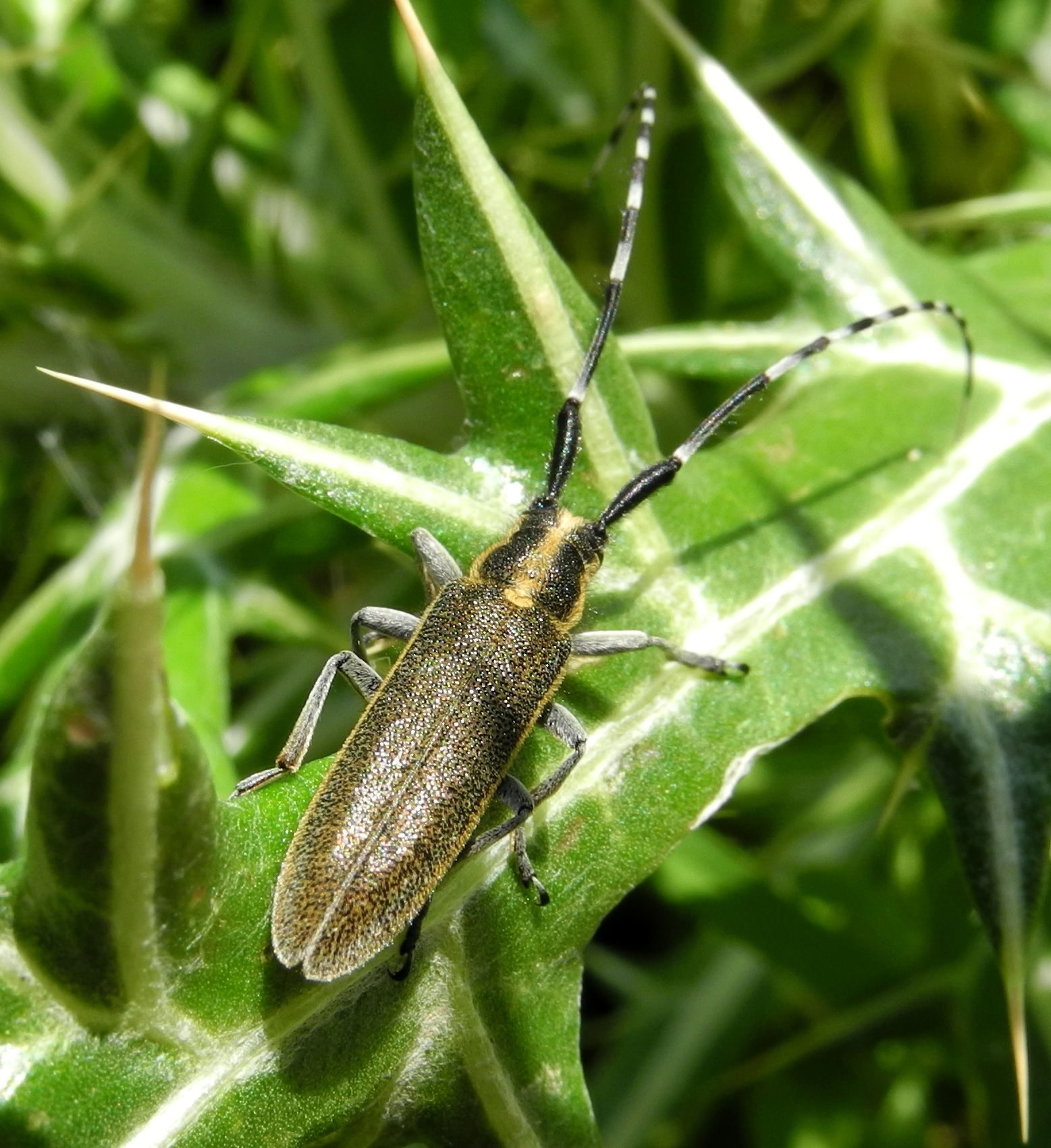
An Agapanthia cynarae longhorn beetle in Galičica National Park

The at least 10,081 species of insects make up around 85% of the country's arthropod species. At least 3,145 beetle species have been identified, split between 84 families. The ground beetles make up a large number of these, represented by 573 species. Within the Staphylinoidea superfamily there are 516 species, including representatives of the Staphylinidae (383 species), Cholevinae (57), Hydraenidae (42), Silphidae (14), Ptiliidae (4), and Agyrtidae (1) families. Water beetles have been identified from the Dytiscidae (62), Haliplidae (11), Gyrinidae (6), and Noteridae (2) families. Within Hydrophiloidea, there are 68 Histeridae species and 33 Hydrophilidae species. There are 14 families of Scarabaeoidea represented, which altogether contain 172 species. Within Cucujoidea, there are perhaps over 200 species, of which 116 are Nitidulidae and 33 are Coccinellidae. Within Chrysomeloidea, there are 340 leaf beetles and 176 longhorn beetles. The 88 species of Bostrichiformia are split between four families: Bostrichidae, Dermestidae, Ptinidae, and Nosodendridae. There are 100 species of Elateroidea. Most are click beetles (74), with the rest being soldier beetles (15), fireflies (7), and net-winged beetles (4). There are 44 identified Cleroidea species. 17 each are from Malachiinae and Dasytinae. One Dasytidae species is endemic to the Šar Mountains. The remaining 10 are from the Cleridae family. Other beetles include 290 Curculionidae and 45 darkling beetles.

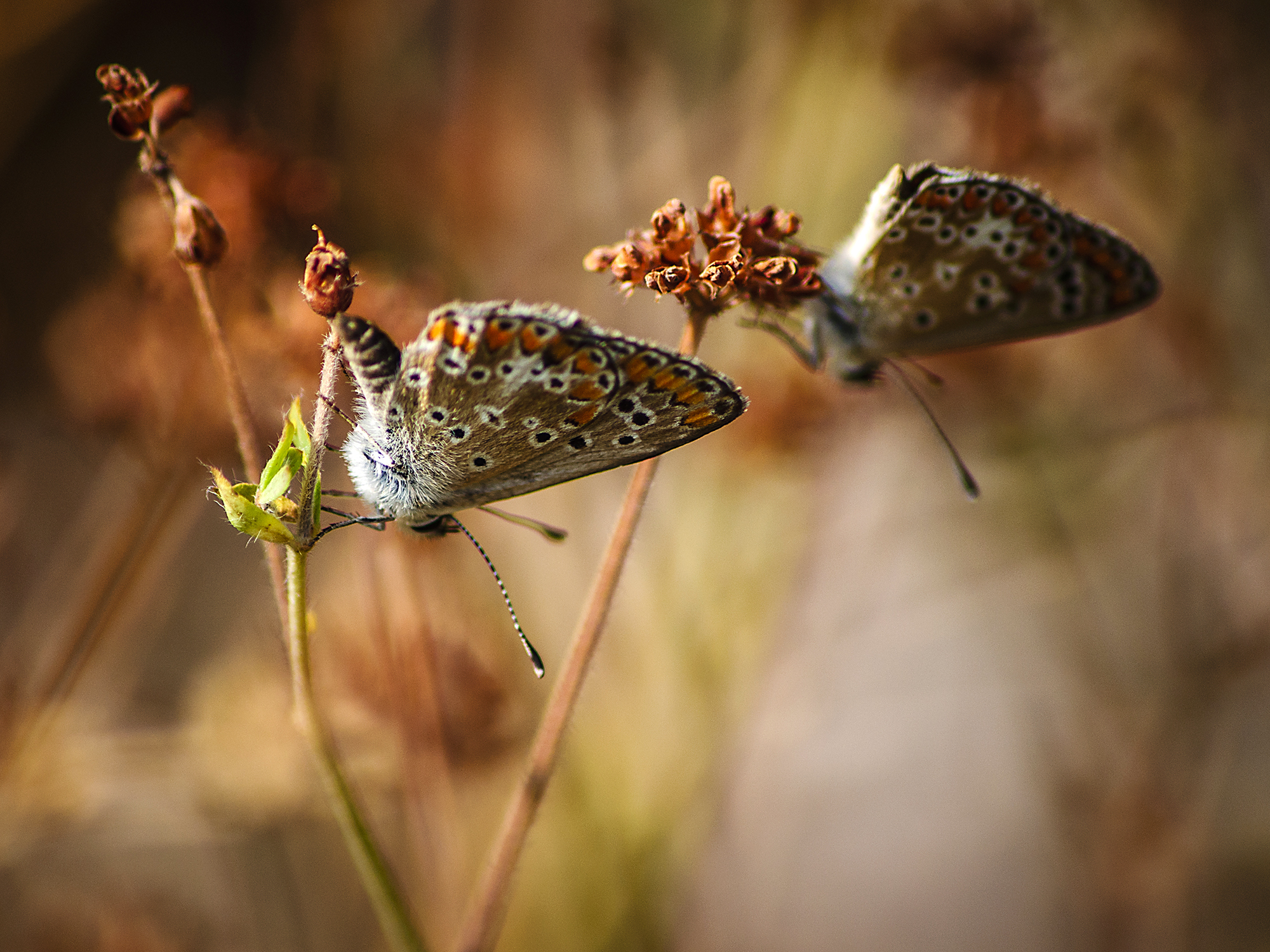
2,638 Lepidoptera species have been found in North Macedonia

A total of 2,638 species of Lepidoptera have been identified. These are split between 68 families, with family size ranging from a single species to 528 species (the Noctuidae). 67 species have been provisionally assessed for IUCN Red List status within North Macedonia. One has been identified as endangered, with 15 being vulnerable and 24 being near threatened.

There are over 1,500 species of flies, representing 54 families. The largest family is that of the hoverflies, represented by 262 species. Some flies are considered potential disease vectors, and one, Obolodiplosis robiniae, is invasive.

Hymenoptera is another diverse order, represented by about 1077 species. One relatively well-studied group are parasitoid wasps. 150 species of Braconidae have been found. The 129 Ichneumonidae species (21 of which fall within Cryptinae) present include three endemics: Hadrodactylus tiphae balcanicus, Mesochorus venerandus, and Gelis balcanicus. Eulophidae has 40 species. Non-parasitic wasps include 75 members of the family Vespidae and 37 members of the family Mutillidae. In addition to wasps, there are at least 113 Apidae bee species and 99 ant species.

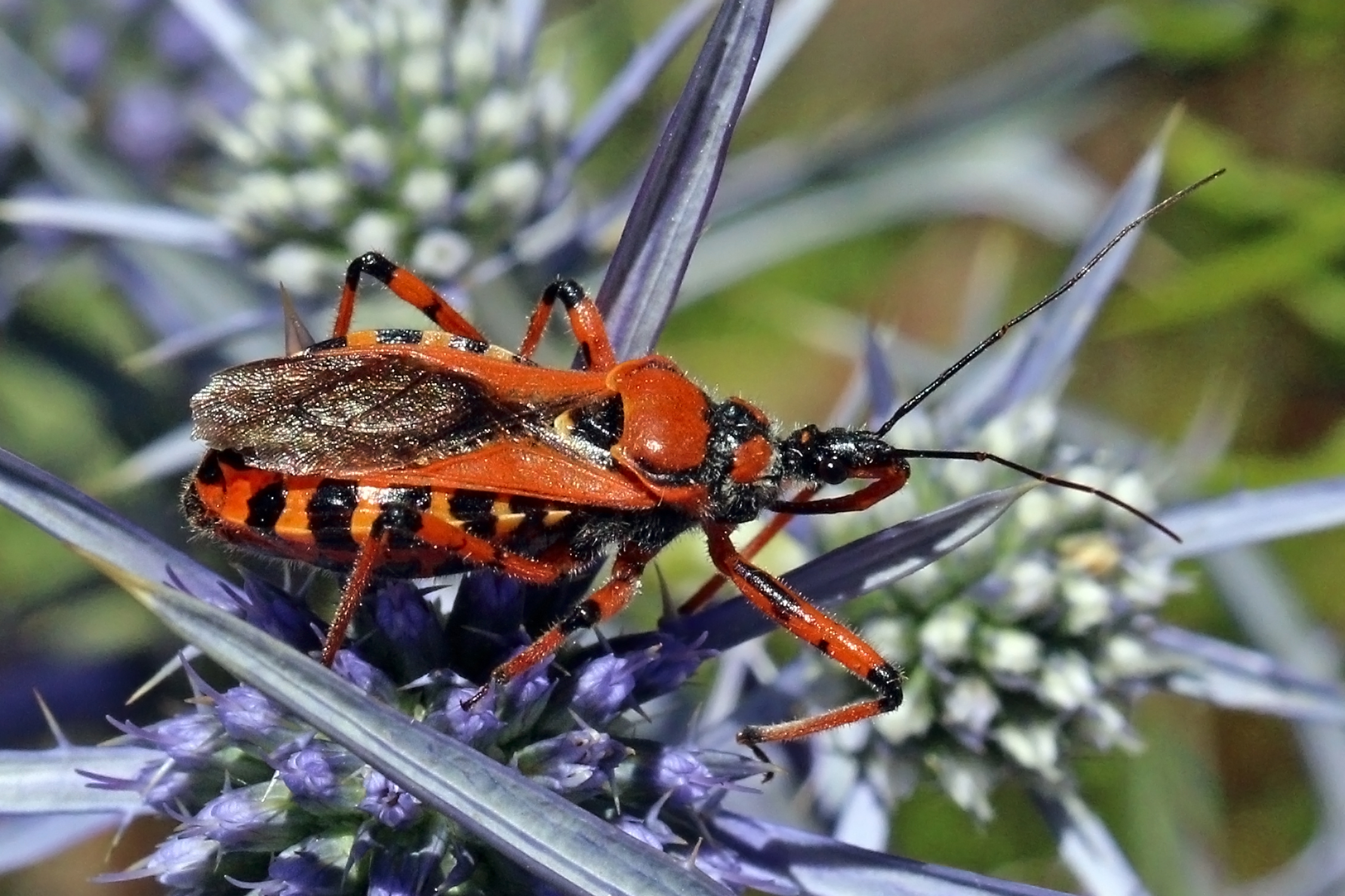
Rhynocoris iracundus, one of the Heteroptera species found in North Macedonia

Within Hemiptera, 776 species of Heteroptera (15 endemic) have been identified. However, local expertise in this taxon is lacking. It has been suggested that the discovered number makes up only 62% of the total species present, taking into account the rate of new discoveries, the diversity of habitats, and studies from neighbouring countries. Knowledge about Homoptera is also very limited, with most studies covering a small number of species from specific locations. The known Homoptera consist of 134 Sternorrhyncha, 15 Cicadomorpha, and 13 Fulgoromorpha.

There are 175 identified orthoptera species. One, Bradyporus macrogaster macrogaste, is critically endangered. Four are considered endangered, while another eight are considered vulnerable (another 10 are data deficient). Some species are known only from a single location, or even a single record. There are perhaps 106 caddisfly species, although estimates vary. The 68 species of identified Neuropterida consist of 59 Neuroptera and nine Raphidioptera. The 13 known flea species include parasites of the Balkan snow vole. The country has 68 identified mayflies, including seven Rhithrogena species, all found in the Pena river. Known Dictyoptera include 12 cockroaches, four mantis, and two termites. Of the 14 lice species known, two, Enderleinellus ferrisi and Schizophthirus gliris, are parasites (of European ground squirrels and edible dormice respectively). Haploembia solieri, which was found in Valandovo, is the only recorded Embioptera species. Other insect species include 97 Plecoptera (10 of which are endemic), 64 Odonata, 49 Psocoptera, 42 Thysanoptera, five Dermaptera, three Archaeognatha, two Mecoptera, one Strepsiptera (Hylecthrus rubi), and one Zygentoma. There is no data for Megaloptera within the country.

===== Crustaceans =====
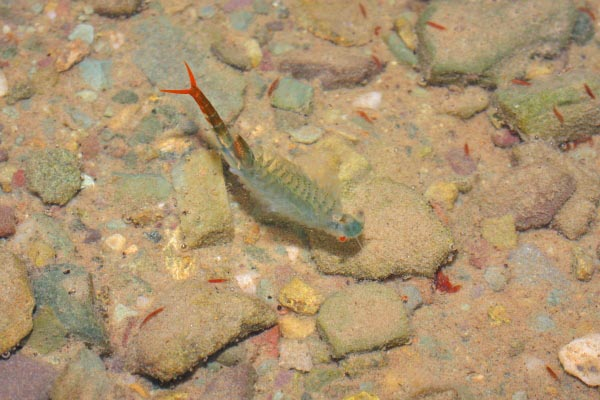
Chirocephalus diaphanus in a mountain lake

Of the 490 crustacean species found, 133 are considered endemic. Within the class Branchiopoda, the most numerous order is Diplostraca, which has 86 species. Alona smirnovi is endemic to Lake Ohrid. Of the other orders, there are six species of Anostraca, including Chirocephalus pelagonicus which is endemic to wetlands in the Pelagonia plain. The two species of order Notostraca (which contains only the Triopsidae family) present are Lepidurus apus and Triops cancriformis.

All 172 representatives of the ostracods are from the order Podocopida. Numerous genera within this order have high levels of endemism.

Of the class Maxillopoda, 146 species are copepods: 60 Cyclopoida, 54 Harpacticoida, 30 Calanoida, and two Poecilostomatoida. Both Cyclopoida and Harpacticoida contain several endemic genera. 12 of these copepods are known to be parasitic, found infecting fish in the major lakes. Other Maxillopoda include three Branchiura, all from the genus Argulus within the class Argulidae. One, Argulus foliaceus, is a parasite of at least three fish species. There is one representative of the Pentastomida known: Linguatula serrata, which is a human parasite.

There are representatives of four orders of Malacostraca. Isopoda is represented by 50 species, of which about a third are endemic. Amphipoda is represented by 47 species, with five genera (Bogidiella, Gammarus, Niphargus, Hadzia, and Ignolfiella) containing many endemic species. Decapoda is represented by five species: two Astacidae (Austropotamobius torrentium and Astacus astacus), two Potamidae (Potamon fluviatile and Potamon ibericum), and one Atyidae (Atyaephyra stankoi, which was found in Lake Dojran). Bathynellacea is represented by three species: Bathynella natans, Parabathynella stygia, and Bathynella chappuisi.

There are around 100 species of Myriapoda, including 18 endemic millipedes. There are 21 identified species of Entognatha, including 11 Collembola, eight Protura and two Diplura.

=== Fish ===
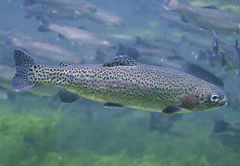
The rainbow trout is invasive in North Macedonia

The total number of fish species differs between sources, potentially due to different classifications regarding what counts as a species. One calculation identifies 85 Actinopterygii and two lampreys. Of these, 27 are endemic, and 19 are invasive. Some fish are endemic to certain lakes or rivers. Lake Ohrid has 21 native species, of which nine are endemic, and seven are introduced species. Lake Prespa has 11 native species, of which eight are endemic, and 12 introduced species. Lake Dojran has 12 native species, one of which is endemic, along with two introduced species.

Of the Actinopterygii, the European sea sturgeon, the European eel, and Alburnus macedonicus are considered critically endangered, and the Prespa minnow and Salmo peristericus are considered endangered. A further 10 species are vulnerable, one near threatened, and 10 data deficient. Salmonidae species in Orhid Lake are endangered, while the common carp is endangered in Lake Prespa. The two lamprey species are the Ukrainian brook lamprey and Eudontomyzon stankokaramani. The first lives in the Vardar's drainage basin, while the second lives in the Adriatic Sea basin. Both are protected by law.

=== Amphibians ===
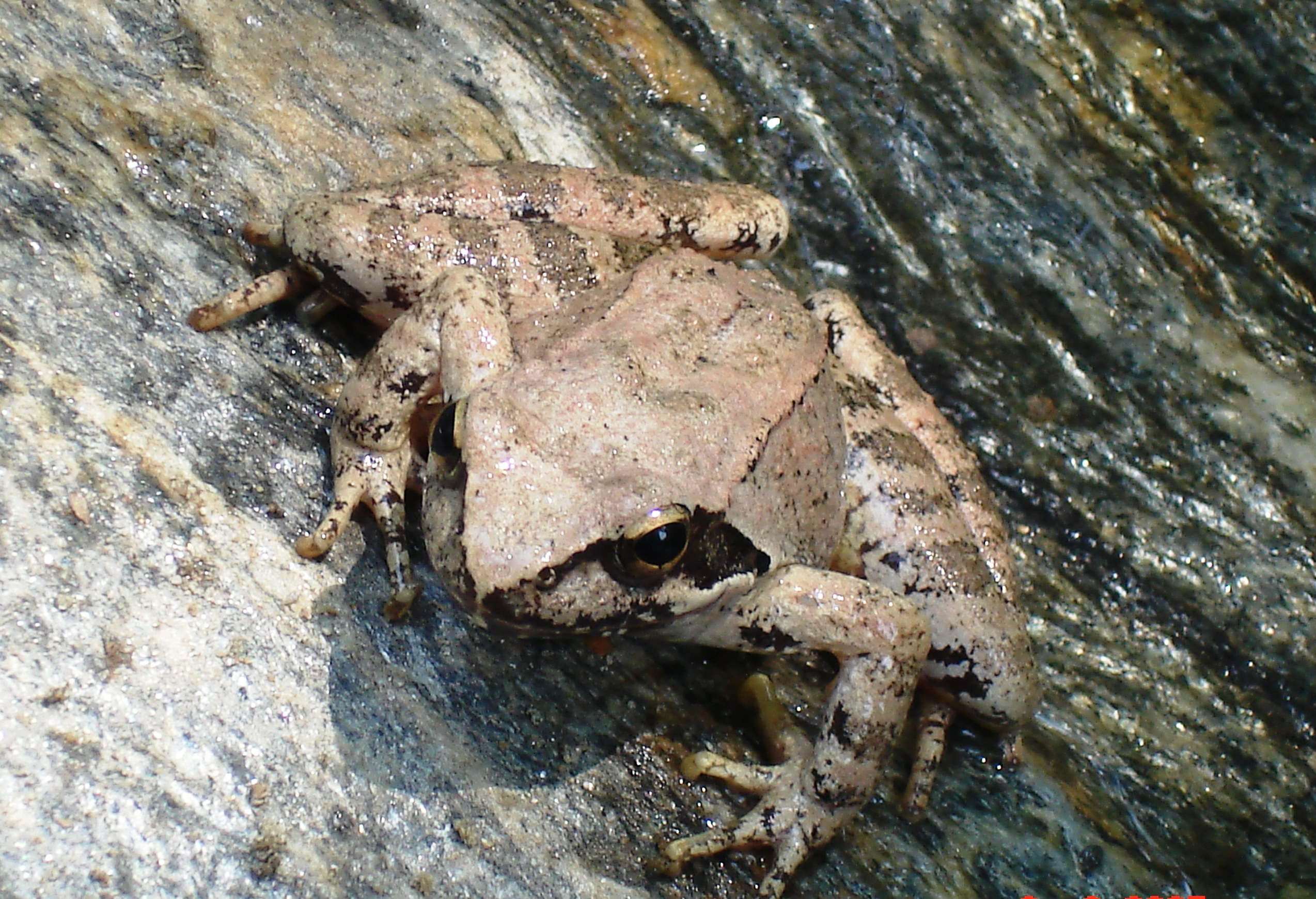
A frog in Marko's River

The amphibian species found comprise nine frogs, and five salamanders. Three of these have been categorized as endangered, three as vulnerable, three as near threatened, and five as least concern. Considering the effects of disease and habitat loss, that proportion of threatened amphibian species is roughly in line with the state of amphibians worldwide. None of these species are endemic to the country, although two are endemic to the Balkans.

=== Reptiles ===
The 32 species of reptiles present are made up of 16 snakes, 12 lizards, and four tortoises. Within North Macedonia, 11 of these species are widespread, 10 are restricted to certain habitats, and 11 have very limited range. While none of these are endemic to the country, two are endemic to the Balkans. One snake species present is the Caspian whipsnake, Europe's largest snake.

Of those with IUCN Red List assessments, seven of them are endangered, six are vulnerable, eight are near threatened, and ten are of least concern. The globally vulnerable Vipera ursinii, one of three Viperidae in North Macedonia, has strict protection, while another 22 species have some level of protection. Hermann's tortoise, found in forest and meadows, are expected to lost at least one third of their population over the next 75 years.

=== Birds ===
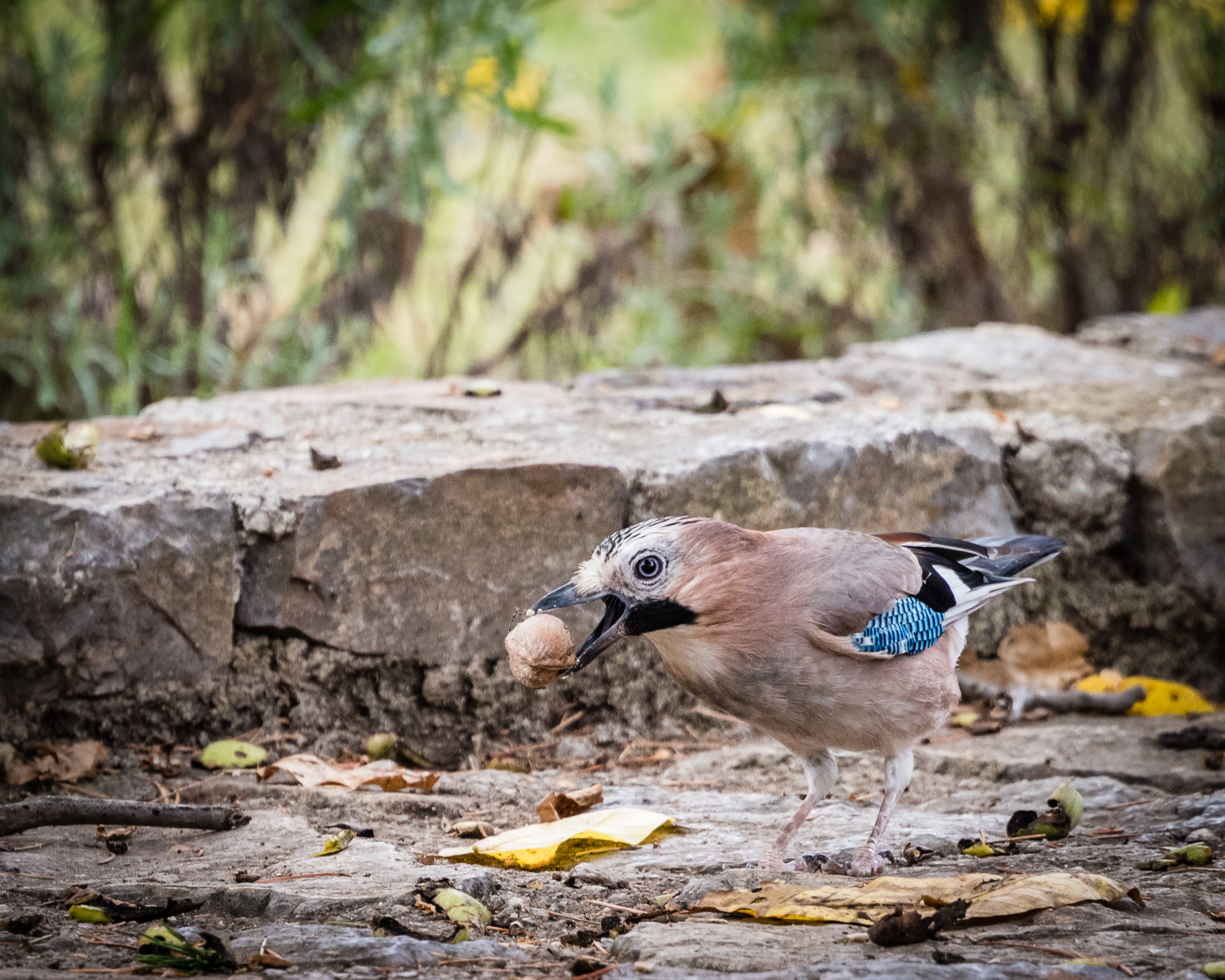
A Eurasian jay at the Monastery of Saint Naum

There are 318 bird species with confirmed sightings, and an additional 16 for which there are less reliable claims. None are endemic. 215 of these species nest in the country. 106 bird species have some level of protection under law. At least eight nesting species have become locally extinct, while another 7–15 no longer nest in the country. For many species, fewer than 100 nesting couples remain.

=== Mammals ===
At least 85 mammal species inhabit North Macedonia, of which four are endemic to the Balkans: the western broad-toothed field mouse, the Balkan snow vole, Felten's vole, and the Balkan mole. The chamois sub-species Rupicapra rupicapra balcanica and lynx sub-species the Balkan lynx are endemic to the Balkans, and have core populations within North Macedonia. It has been suggested that the country's European ground squirrel population be considered its own sub-species. Eight mammal species are considered invasive.

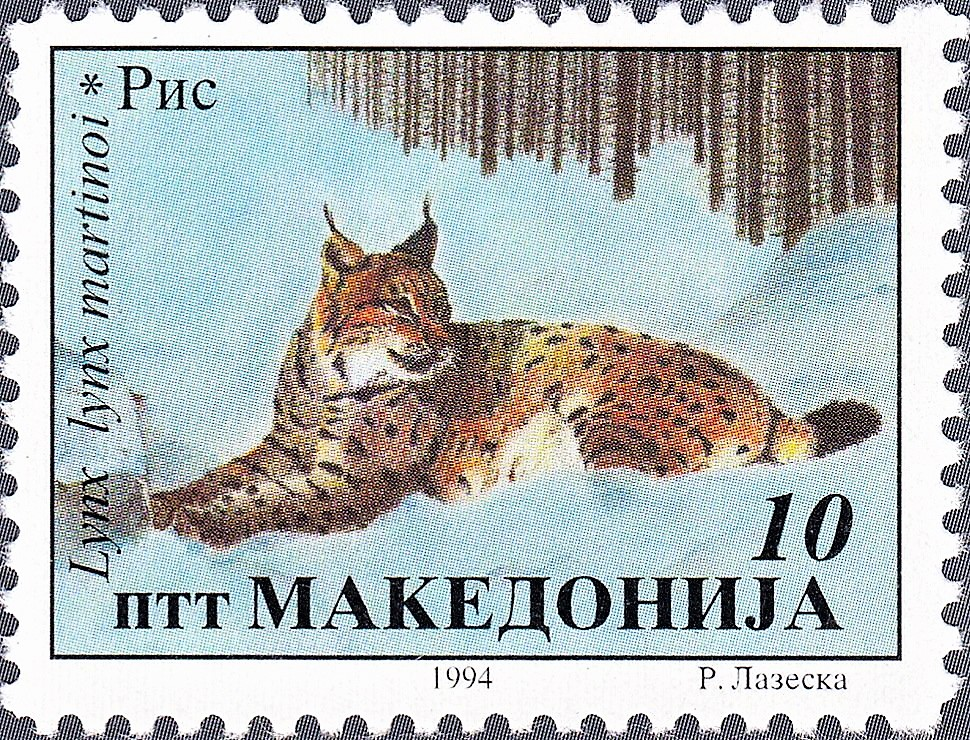
The Balkan lynx on a Macedonian stamp

The Balkan lynx persists around the Albanian-Macedonian border. Its low population leads it to being rarely seen, and it is the subject of recovery efforts. The lynx has a reputation for killing livestock, despite there being very few recorded incidents. There are perhaps fewer than 100 spread across North Macedonia and Albania. Brown bears live in mountainous forests in the west of the country. Around 160-200 individuals inhabit these forests, part of the larger Dinaric-Pindos population. About 70 are found in Mavrovo National Park. The population of wolves numbered around 800–1000 as of 2013.

Eurasian otters can be found throughout most waterways, although they are absent from a couple of areas with particularly high levels of pollution. Golden jackals were considered extinct in the area by the 1960s, but became re-established in forested mountainous areas, especially in the west, during the 21st century. An individual raccoon dog, a species which was introduced to European Russia in the 20th century, was found dead in the north of the country, indicating the species is spreading southwards. Herbivores include roe deer, chamois, wild boar, and European hares. European ground squirrels are found on Mount Mokra.

The European wildcat, Balkan lynx, Eurasian otter, brown bear, European ground squirrel, and Balkan snow vole have strict protection under national legislation, and another 10 mammal species have lesser levels of protection. Three bats, two rodents, and one mustelid are listed as threatened in the IUCN Red List.

== Algae ==
Knowledge of algal species in North Macedonia remains patchy, with inconsistent research and several taxa that remain not fully identified. There are 2095 identified forms of algae, with the vast majority being diatoms. It is thought at least 10% of these are endemic, with at least 194 having been so far identified as such. Most research on algae has taken place in Lakes Ohrid and Prespa. Lake Ohrid by itself holds 798 identified taxa, with 158 being endemic to just that lake.

== Diversity and endemism hotspots ==
Lake Ohrid and Lake Prespa are the two largest lakes in North Macedonia.

Within North Macedonia, there are multiple areas that are likely high in endemism. Lake Ohrid is an extensively studied area, and its diversity is reflected in a high number of endemic species. Lake Prespa lies quite close to Lake Ohrid, and the two lakes are connected hydrologically. While Lake Prespa has fewer species than Lake Ohrid and while the two lakes share similar species compositions, Lake Prespa has its own endemic species and species more closely related to more western water bodies than to Lake Ohrid.

Within Lake Ohrid alone there are over 100 insects, 75 flatworms (35 endemic to the lake and nearby waterbodies), 72 gastropods (56 endemic), 52 ostracods (33 endemic), 49 rotifers, 43 Acari, 36 oligochaetes (17 endemic), 36 copepods (six endemic), 31 Cladocera (one endemic), 30 endemic ciliates, 24 leeches (12 endemic), 24 nematodes (three endemic), 14 amoebas, 13 bivalves (two endemic), 10–11 Amphipoda (9 endemic), four isopods (3 endemic), four sponges, and two decapods. The Ancylus genus species in this lake are monophyletic, likely evolving within the lake itself. The same situation is true for leeches from the genus Dina.

Lake Prespa is less well studied, but is known to have at over 100 insects, 90 crustaceans, 60 rotifers, 50 flatworms, 36 molluscs (27 of which are snails), 35 annelids, and three sponges. Seven of these snails are endemic, as is the mollusc Pisidium maasseni. Radix snail species in both Ohrid and Lake Prespas are related, and there are endemic species within springs near the Monastery of Saint Naum that are unrelated to the species found in the lakes. Lake Dojran has 17 rotifers.

It is expected that mountainous areas will also contain a number of endemic species. North Macedonia contains many areas of ice age refugia, which retain significant plant diversity. Plant endemism and sub-endemism is high around mountainous areas. Mammal diversity is highest in the mountainous west of the country. Caves in the west, especially within the drainage basins of the Radika, Galichica, Jakupica, and Poreche rivers, are thought to have rates of invertebrate endemism of around 90%. 57 species of stygofauna are known, including 14 pseudoscorpions, 12 beetles, and 10 isopods.

== Human influence ==
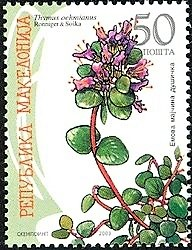
Thymus oehmianus on a Macedonian stamp.

There is significant interaction between the people of North Macedonia and wildlife, especially in rural areas. This continues despite rural areas decreasing in population by 2.2% from 2005 to 2010. Foraging for wild plants remains a common activity for those in rural areas. Around 700 plant species are considered medicinal or aromatic, with 220 frequently used. A quarter of known fungi species are edible, and some fungi and lichens are collected for use and export.

Carnivores, such as bears, wolves, and lynx, are viewed negatively in some areas. Bears and wolves are known to attack livestock such as sheep, cattle, and goats. In some instances wolves have been reported to hunt up to 38% of sheep flocks, and an even higher percentage of goats. Foxes and wild cats are reported to kill poultry. There are reports of bear, wolf, and even lynx and jackal attacks on humans, although none of these attacks resulted in deaths. Such conflict is expected to decrease given the number of sheep in the country halved following a 1996 foot-and-mouth disease outbreak and a resultant drop in the value of sheep products. Bears and wild boars are also known to damage agricultural produce.

Some species have cultural relevance. The lynx is depicted on a denar coin. Storks are considered to bring luck in local folklore, especially with regard to child-bearing.

=== Threats ===
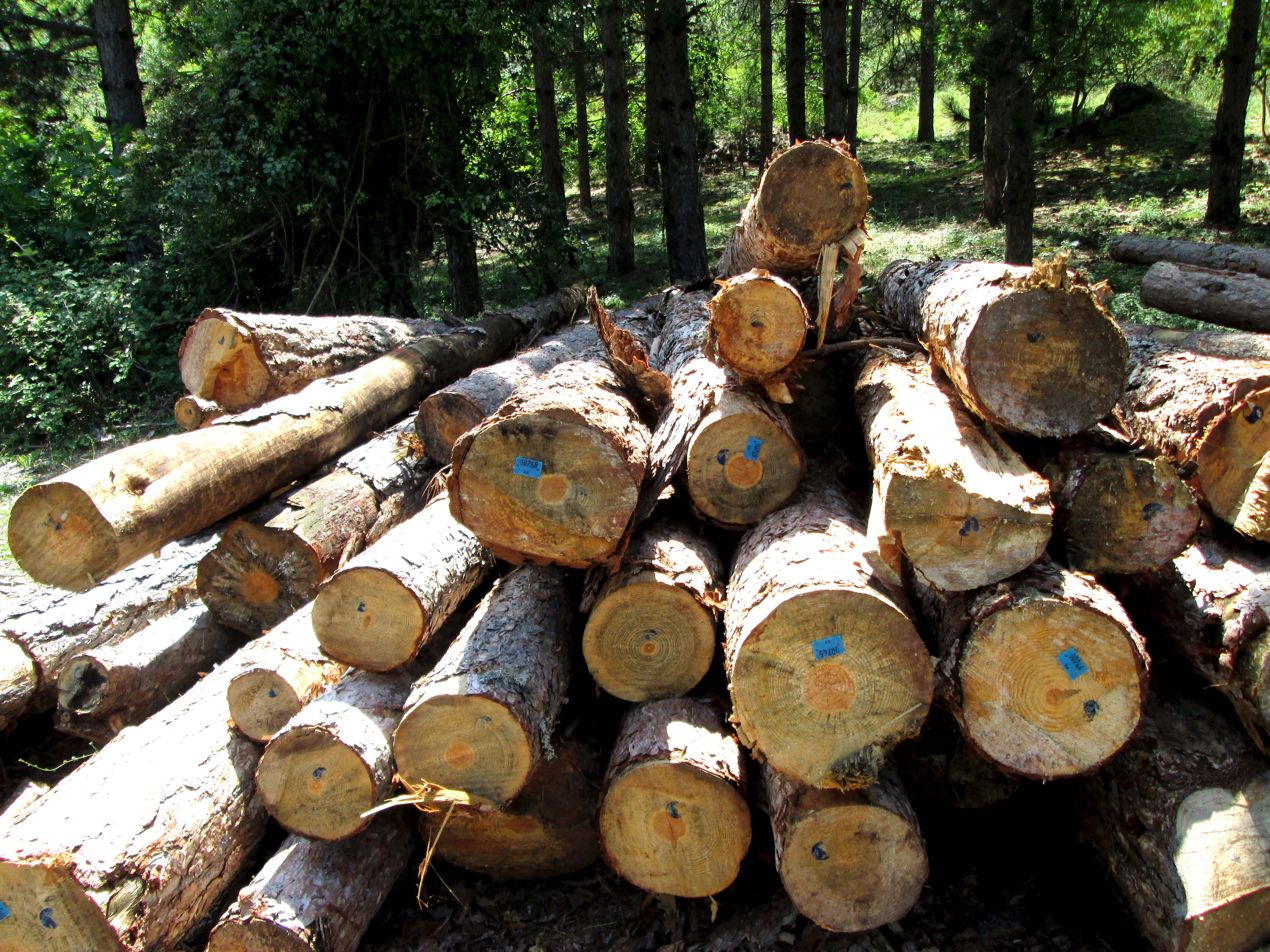
Logged trees near the Radika river

Data deficiency is a significant issue for assessing environmental threats. For example, knowledge about invasive species in lacking. The invasive species that are relatively well studied are generally those that directly affect commercial resources, such as the Colorado potato beetle affecting crops and the Prussian carp reducing native fish populations in Lake Dojran.

Marsh draining, agricultural land use change, and mining have significantly altered the landscape. Hydropower dams have been placed in gorges that host rare and endemic plants. Lysimachia thyrsiflora became locally extinct due to the creation of Mavrovo Lake. Dams in the Black Drim have blocked eel migration to the Sargasso Sea. Smaller watercourses are at risk of diversion and depletion due to demand for irrigation.

Water pollution remains an issue. The most polluted river, the Vardar, is polluted by around 120,000,000 cubic metres (4.2×10^{9} cu ft) of waste annually, including 75000 tons of solid particles, 5000 tons of nitrogen, and 1000 tons of phosphorus. Heavy industry contributes to such pollution in both surface and groundwater. Marshes are a habitat under considerable threat, not just from land use changes but from climate change, and lowland marshes may disappear completely from the country. This wetland conversion is threatening local plant species. In addition to water pollution and water flow modification, fish are threatened by illegal fishing and invasive species. On land, many plant species are threatened by over-harvesting. Gentiana lutea is rare due to over-collection for medical purposes. Illegal logging is also a threat, reducing the habitat of animals such as lynx.

Poaching can be an issue, with traps and poison used to catch animals such as wild boar. Poaching increased after independence, due to perceived high fees for hunting within one of the 249 hunting grounds and a lack of punishment, despite poaching a lynx theoretically being punishable by eight years in jail. Wolf hunting is legal. As they are considered pests, the government pays a bounty of 700 denar per wolf killed. Between 100 and 200 wolves are killed per year, mostly through chance encounters during the hunting of other animals. Brown bears are still sometimes poached, and while hunting them was banned in 1996, their population has not increased significantly since then. Poaching has also caused a decline in the chamois population.

=== Conservation ===
Balkan lynx are mostly found in the mountainous west.

Of the 22,500 species that occur in the country, over 800 are considered to be endemic. Some species listed as endemic nonetheless have ranges which may stretch slightly outside North Macedonia's borders. For example, species found only in the three major lakes are considered endemic, despite the lakes being shared with neighbouring countries.

North Macedonia contains 33 pan-European habitat types regarded as endangered under the Bern Convention's Emerald network. The network covers 35 areas encompassing 29% of the country. The same network includes 167 species that require specific conservation measures: 7 invertebrates, 13 fish, 3 amphibians, 7 reptiles, 115 birds, 17 mammals, and 5 plants.

The government of North Macedonia has classified threats to biological diversity into 249 items, 17 of which were considered to have a very high priority. The root causes behind these 17 priority threats include poor policymaking, inconsistent enforcement of laws and regulations, poverty, low public awareness, and climate change. 18 habitats are thought to be vulnerable to climate change, along with 58 plant species and 224 animal species.

65 bird species are listed under the European Union's Birds Directive Annex I, while 15 migratory bird species are listed under Annex I of the Convention on the Conservation of Migratory Species of Wild Animals. 24 reptiles are listed in the Bern Convention and 25 in the European Union Habitats directive appendices. Eight amphibian species are protected by law, while also falling under the Bern Convention and European Union Habitats directive. 34 fish species have protection under Macedonian law. BirdLife International has identified 24 Important Bird and Biodiversity Areas, while Plantlife International has identified 42 Important Plant Areas.

The Vulture Conservation Project has been operated by the Macedonian Ecological Society since 2003. The Balkan Lynx Recovery Programme (or Programme for Balkan Lynx Recovery) began in 2006.

From 2007 to 2014, the government allocated between 4 and 9 million denar each year for environmental protection. However, most funding comes from external bodies, such as the Global Environment Facility, the European Union (including pre-accession assistance), and bilateral contributions. Cross-border projects exist with Albania, Bulgaria, and Greece. Species that have increased in number from low bases of local extirpation include Gentiana pneumonanthe, Ranunculus lingua, Salvinia natans, Nuphar lutea, and Menyanthes trifoliata.

=== Legal framework ===
Environmental protection became part of national law for the first time in 1963, under Article 32 of the Constitution of the Socialist Republic of Macedonia. This was maintained in the 1991 Constitution of the Republic of Macedonia under Article 56. The constitution obliges citizens to promote and protect the environment.

Most environmental laws are set at a national level, with Assembly of North Macedonia having a commission for transport, communications, and environment. The Ministry of Environment and Physical Planning (MoEPP) handles government implementation of laws and regulations. In 2007, the Administration of Environment was established within the MoEPP. In 2014 the State Inspectorate of Environment and Nature became a separate legal entity within the MoEPP. The Ministry of Agriculture, Forestry, and Water Economy also plays a role in ensuring the environment is utilised sustainably.

The country is working to integrate European Union environmental legislation into its national laws, and to meet the Aichi targets. IUCN Red List classification and methodology is specifically referenced by the Law on Nature Protection of the Republic of North Macedonia ("Official Gazette" no. 67/04, as amended).

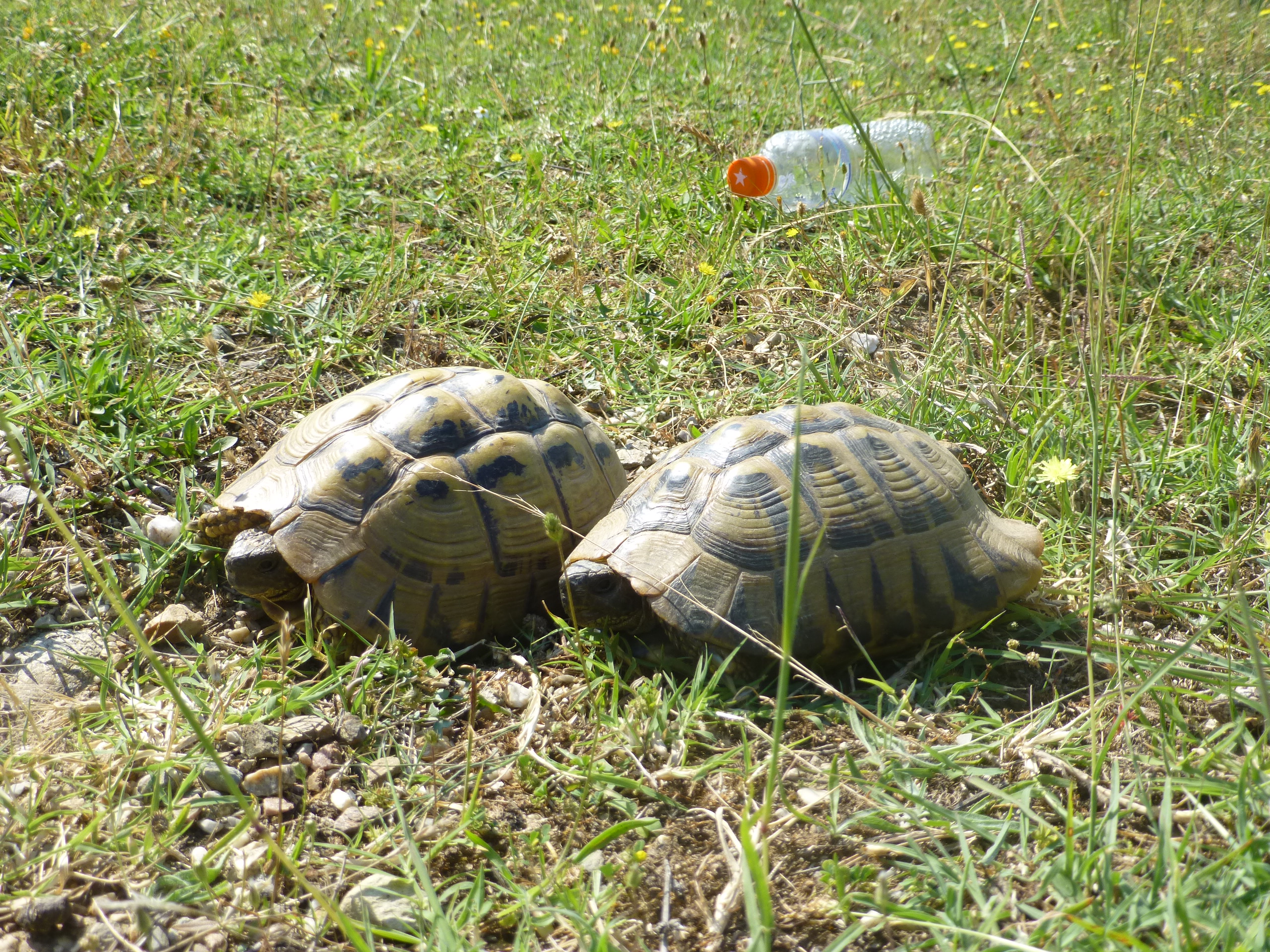
Tortoises and litter near the Krushevo River

While the MoEPP is responsible for nature protecting and monitoring, natural resources, such as forests, waters, and game animals remain under the jurisdiction of other ministries. This overlap in jurisdiction has complicated ecosystem management, and the implementation of the European Union Acquis communautaire into Macedonian law. Different aspects of environmental monitoring are carried out by a number of different ministries. However, the development of a biodiversity strategy was an early example of effective cooperation between ministries.

The Law on Protection of Ohrid, Prespa and Lake Dojrans provided specific protection for the three large lakes starting in 1977. The Law on Environment and Nature Protection and Promotion was instituted in 1996. The Law on Nature Protection was established in 2004 to consolidate previous laws, such as the Law on Natural Rarities (1973) and the Law on Protection of Ohrid, Prespa and Lake Dojrans (1977), and the Law on Protection of National Parks (1980). It also transposes parts of the Acquis communautaire, namely the Habitats Directive, the Birds Directive, and the Regulation on the Protection of Species of Wild Fauna and Flora by Regulating Trade Therein. The use of natural resources such as wild plants and animal parts is regulated under the Law on Nature Protection. National parks issue permits for the collection of wild resources from their forests. This law also legislates to protect the environment from invasive species.

Forests are regulated under the Spatial Plan of the Republic of Macedonia (2004), the Strategy for Sustainable Forestry Development in the Republic of Macedonia (2006), the Law on Reproductive Material of Forest Tree Species (2007), and the Law on Forests (2009). Species important for agriculture have their own protection under Article 78 of the Law on Agriculture and Rural Development. 2666 samples from 89 species were stored in a dedicated Gene Bank at the Institute of Agriculture as of 2013. This seed bank is regulated under the Law on Seeds and Seedlings. The government is considering establishing a gene bank for native flora, after a previous attempt at Botanical Garden of the Institute of Biology at the Faculty of Natural Sciences and Mathematics, Ss. Cyril and Methodius University of Skopje, ended after one year.

The Law on Waters transfers the European Union Water Framework Directive into national law, and directs the management of waters, shorelands, and wetlands. Other laws relevant to water management include the Law on Water Management Companies and the Law on Water Communities. The government has published a National Strategy for Waters to guide its actions, and is preparing specific action plans for various lakes and river systems. Commercial fishing is regulated under the Law on Fishery and Aquaculture. A transboundary plan for fisheries management in Lake Prespa is under development. A joint management plan is being put in place for Lake Ohrid.

The first National Biodiversity Strategy and Action Plan was adopted in 2004, alongside the Law on Nature Protection. Only 56% of its proposed actions were implemented. The 2018–2023 National Biodiversity Strategy and Action Plan was adopted on 13 March 2020 during the government's 58th session, and contains 19 specific targets. Another current plan is the National Strategy for Nature Protection for 2017–2027. The first National Environment Action Plan was put in place in 2006. It and the subsequent Second National Environmental Action Plans direct the government's anti-pollution efforts.

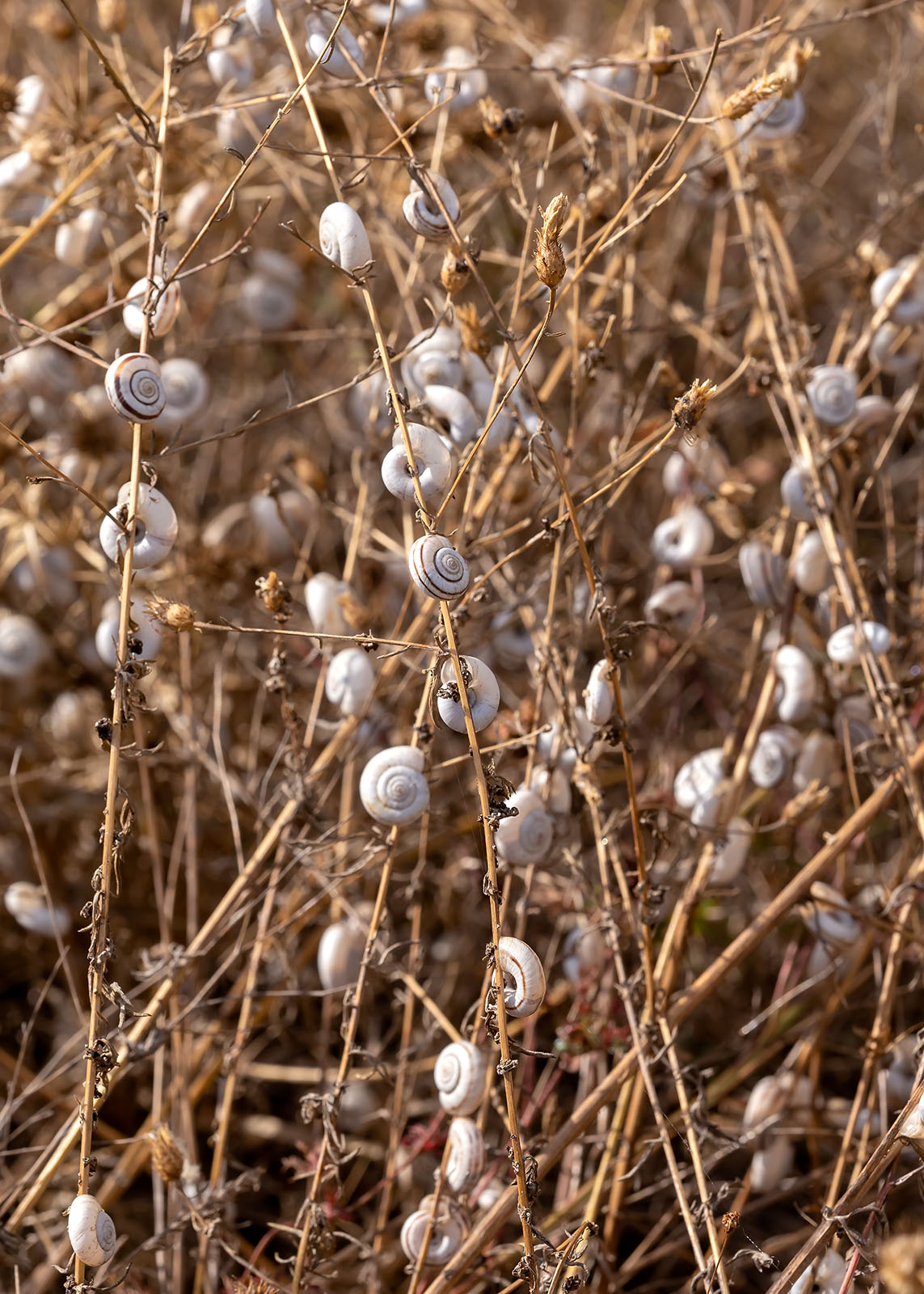
Snails in Galičica National Park

Pelister National Park, established in 1948, was the first national park in Yugoslavia. Mavrovo National Park followed in 1949, and Mount Galičica became the third national park in 1958. The Law on Protection of National Parks was implemented in 1980. Other protected areas include "National Monuments" (Smolare Falls, Markovi Kuli, Kuklica, Lovki-Golemo, Slatinski Izvor cave, Lake Prespa, Lake Dojran, and the Vevchani Springs), "Strict Nature Reserves" (only Ploche Litotelmi), "Nature Parks" (Ezerani at Lake Prespa), and "Natural Rarities" (Dona Duka Cave). Individual species can also be declared natural rarities, and this status has been granted to the sycamore tree. Protected areas have been established in an ad hoc manner, and for a variety of purposes, resulting in no coherent network or strategy. The Law on Nature Protection divided them into six categories. Altogether, the 86 protected sites cover 230,083 ha, or 8.9% of the country (4.5% national parks, 3.0% monuments, 1.4% other protected areas). While these national parks have established management systems, other protected areas lack specific plans and dedicated scientific studies. A fourth park, Shar Mountain National Park, was created in 2021.

There are two classes of protected species under Macedonian law, "Strictly Protected" and "Protected". National protection measures exist for "Strictly Protected" species, but not yet for species identified as "Protected". Legislation has been enacted to control the trade of wildlife and wildlife parts.

The Constitution treats game animals as common goods, which are given special protection. Current regulation is established under the 2012 Law on Hunting. 133 wild species are classified as game: 110 birds and 23 mammals. There are 112 hunting grounds for large game, and 144 for small game. These are all divided between 11 hunting management areas under the General Hunting Management Master Plan. The most hunted species include hares, partridges, pheasants, wild boar, and chamois. Previously unprotected, bears were classified as a game species in 1988, gaining hunting law protections in 1996. 762 wolves, 76 deer, 521 chamois, over 6000 wild boar, over 32,000 rabbits, 252 birds of prey, and 1500 waterfowl were recorded as having been shot between 2003 and 2012. A few hunted species have seen steep reductions in their population. Some deer populations have been reduced by up to 93%. The legal list of protected and strictly protected species has not kept up to date with taxonomy, for example by double-counting species which had previously been assigned multiple names.

==== International conventions ====
North Macedonia ratified the Convention on Biological Diversity in 1997, the United Nations Framework Convention on Climate Change in 1997, the United Nations Convention to Combat Desertification in 2002, and the Kyoto Protocol in 2004. North Macedonia is also a party to the Convention on the Conservation of Migratory Species of Wild Animals, along with the specific Agreement on the Conservation of Populations of European Bats and Agreement on the Conservation of African-Eurasian Migratory Waterbirds.

Two areas totalling 21,616 hectares (53,410 acres) have been designated wetlands of international importance under the Ramsar Convention: Lake Prespa in 1995 and Dorjan Lake in 2007. However, there is currently no national programme for wetlands conservation, despite obligations under the convention. Lake Ohrid was designated a UNESCO World Heritage Site under the criteria for nature in 1979. Slatinski Izvor cave and the Markovi Kuli landscape were tentatively enrolled in 2004.
