= Small Pelister Lake =

Lake in North Macedonia

Coordinates: 40°58′39″N 21°11′11″E

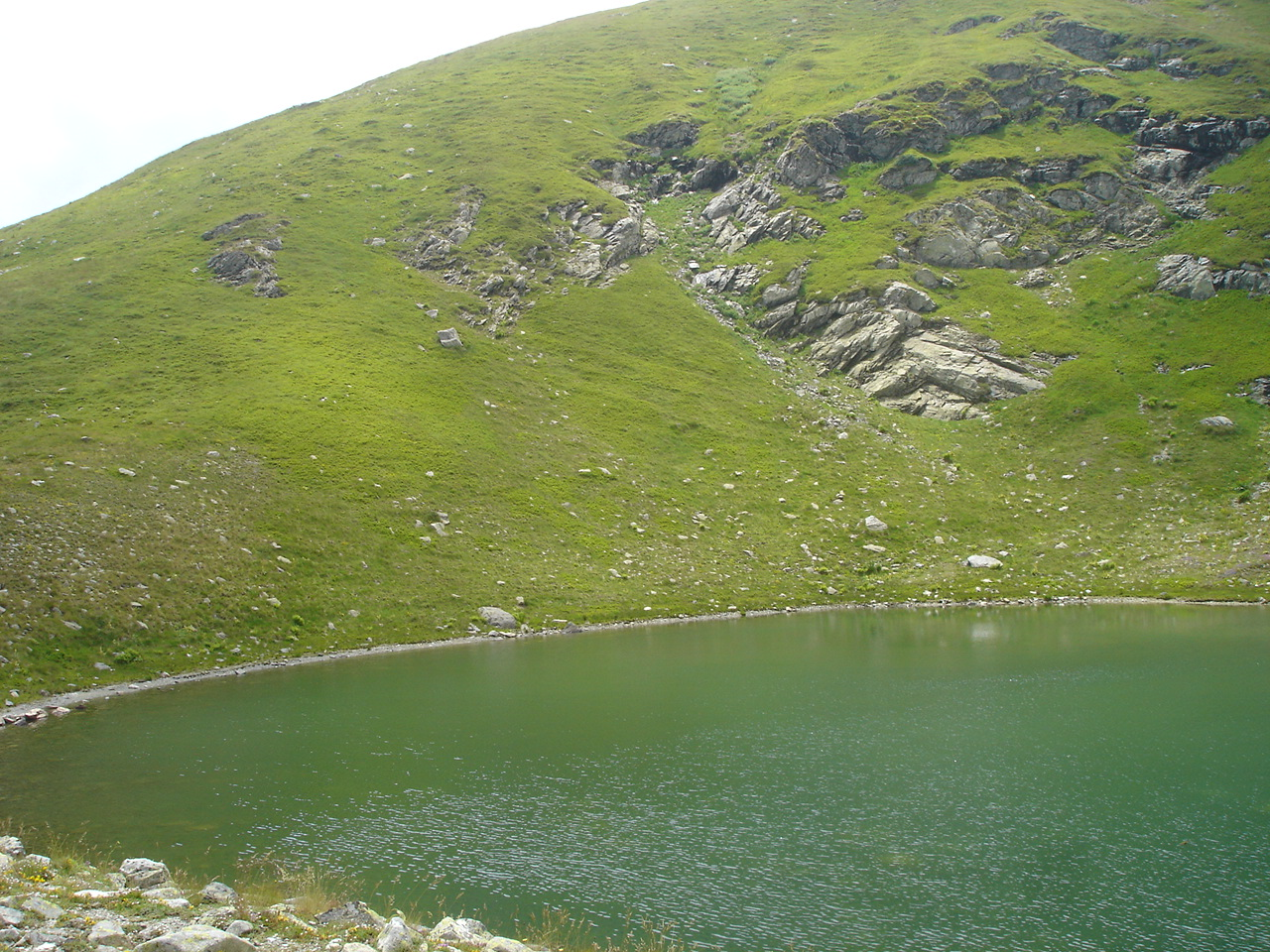
- Image of the lake in 2014
- Interactive map of Small Pelister Lake
- Location: Pelister, North Macedonia
- Max. length: 144 m (472 ft)
- Max. width: 73 m (240 ft)
- Max. depth: 3.35 m (11.0 ft)
- Water volume: 311 m (1,020 ft)
- Surface elevation: 2,190 m (7,190 ft)

Small Pelister Lake (known as Malo Ezero) is a post-glacial glacial lake located in North Macedonia on Mount Baba within the Pelister National Park. The lake is located in the source part of the Crven Reka, which is a left tributary of the Sapunčica river on the northeastern slope of the Baba mountain.

Small Pelister Lake is one of two lakes at Pelister National Park, which are called Pelister's Eyes.
