= Šar Planina National Park =

National park in North Macedonia

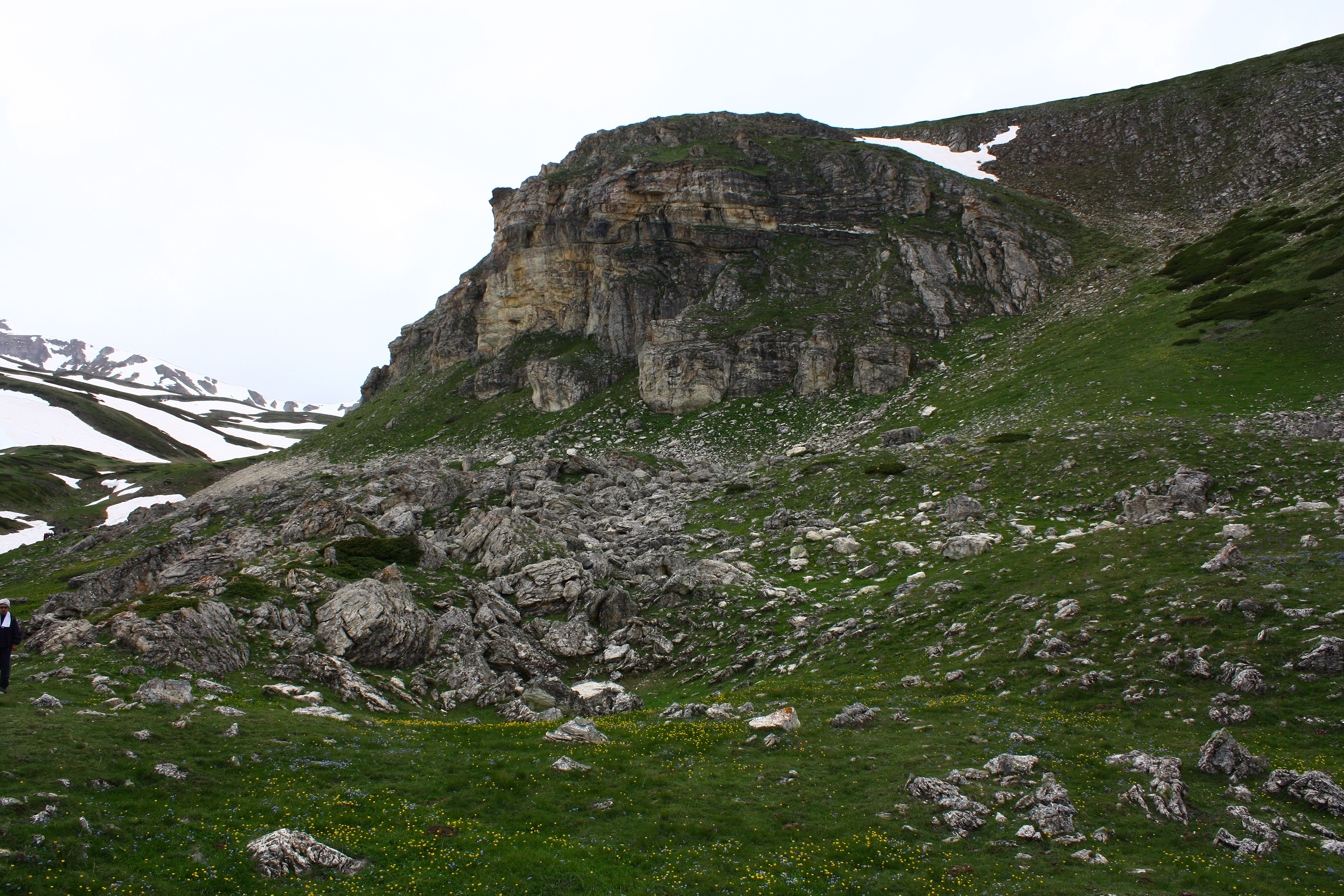
Šar Planina National Park

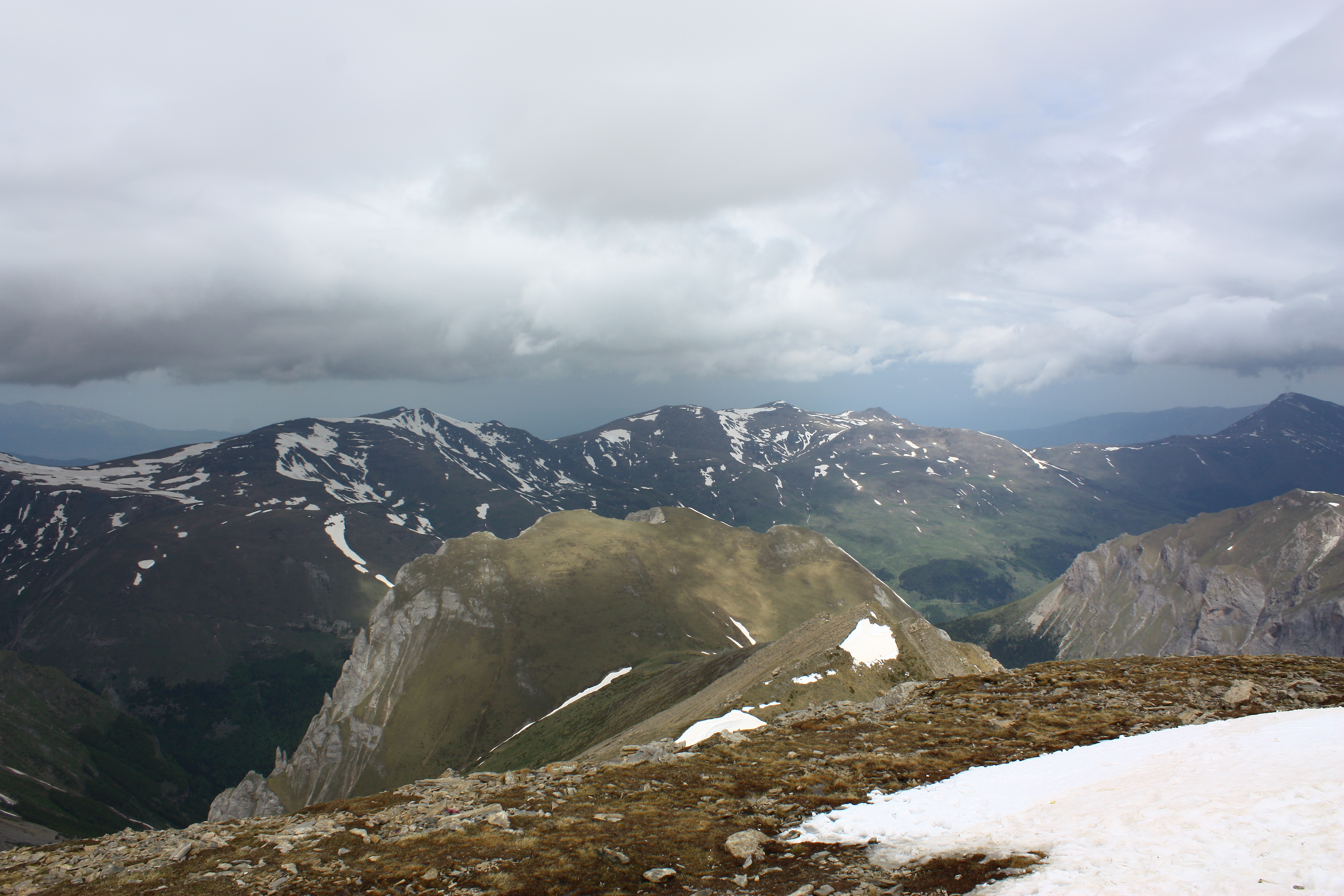
Alternate view

Šar Planina National Park is a national park in North Macedonia within the municipalities Jegunovce, Tearce, Tetovo, Bogovinje, Vrapčište, Gostivar, and Mavrovo i Rostuše. It is the fourth national park in North Macedonia and the first declared as such after its independence.

== Territory ==
The Šar Planina National Park's territory extends across seven municipalities: Jegunovce, Tearce, Tetovo, Bogovinje, Vrapčište, Gostivar, and Mavrovo i Rostuše. The park has the highest number of peaks over 2,000 m in North Macedonia, with around 220 peaks exceeding 2,000 m, including 41 over 2,500 m and 12 above 2,600 m. The range contains 29 permanent glacial lakes, the most in North Macedonia. Its total area consists of 627,05 square kilometers and the park encompasses 30 villages. Apart from bears, wolves and other species, it is home to the Balkan lynx, who is also the park's symbol.

== History ==
According to the International Union for Conservation of Nature, the first initiative for the protection of Šar Planina as a national park is from 1986. After the breakup of Yugoslavia, the first initiative for the protection of Šar Planina in the Republic of Macedonia after its independence was in 1997. It was rejected during the public hearings in 2000, even before entering in parliamentary procedure, probably due to the lack of involvement of the local municipal authorities in the early planning phase, and due to the absence of a public awareness campaign, resulting in the lack of support by local communities. In a survey in April 2021, 82 percent of the residents of Šar Planina favored the declaration of the area as a national park. The Assembly of North Macedonia approved the declaration of the national park on 30 June 2021 with a majority of 66 votes. It is the fourth national park in the country and the first declared as such after its independence. As it was established in 2021, it is also one of the youngest national parks in Europe. Тhe governments of North Macedonia and Kosovo have been advocating for a new road connection between the cities of Tetovo and Prizren through the park.

In April 2024, the administration of the park reported that over 400 hectares of forest were burned in the national park in one month.
