= Pelister National Park =

National park in North Macedonia

- IUCN category II (national park)
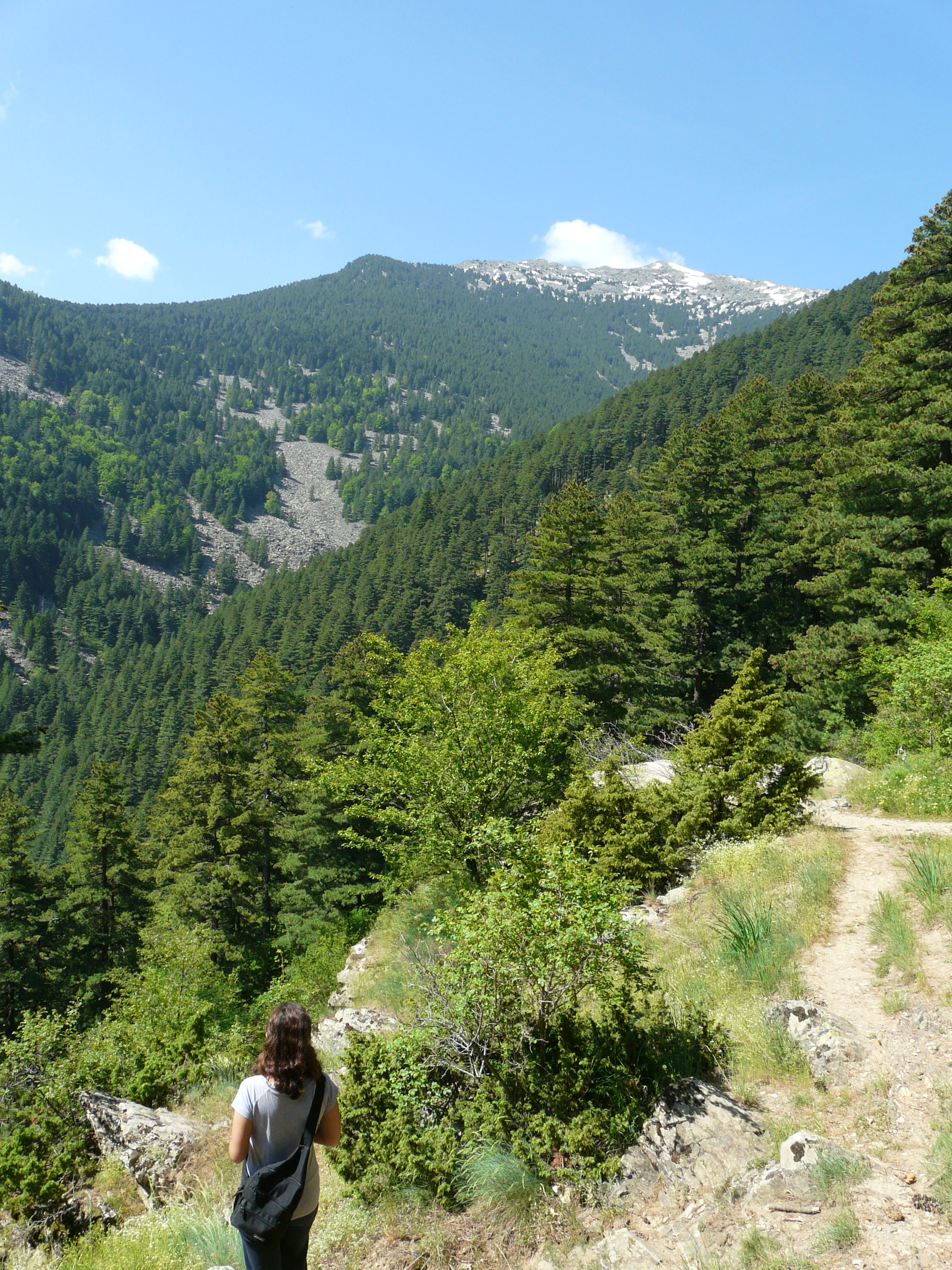

- Location within North Macedonia
- Interactive map of Pelister National Park
- Location: Municipality of Bitola, North Macedonia
- Nearest city: Bitola
- Coordinates: 40°58′52″N 21°11′28″E
- Area: 171.5 km^{2} (66.2 sq mi)
- Established: 1948

Pelister National Park is a national park in the Municipality of Bitola, North Macedonia. The park is located in the Baba Mountain massif and covers an area of 171.5 square kilometres (66.2 sq mi). Established in 1948 as Yugoslavia's first national park and North Macedonia's oldest protected area, Pelister was expanded in 2007 from its original size to 14,300 hectares to enhance protection across a larger portion of the massif. The park spans elevations from 891 to 2,601 metres above sea level and features distinctive geological formations, including Pleistocene-era granite "stone rivers" or moraines, glacial cirques, and two glacial lakes situated at around 2,200 metres.

Known for its rich biodiversity with more than 1,050 plant species, Pelister has extensive forests of the endemic Macedonian pine (Pinus peuce), alongside diverse ecosystems supporting protected wildlife including the grey wolf, European otter, and bearded vulture.

== History and establishment ==
Pelister is Macedonia's first national park and among the oldest in the Balkans, established in 1948. Initially covering a smaller area, the park was expanded to 14,300 hectares in 2007, enhancing protection across a larger area of the Baba mountain massif.

The earliest recorded mountain climbing activity on Pelister dates back to 1836 by Ami Bue, followed by climbs by the Austrian botanist August Grisebach in 1839, and others including Edmund Spenser (1850) and Henrih Bart (1862). Organized mountaineering activities began with the establishment of the mountaineering society "Pelagonija" in 1926, later renamed "Pelister". By 1938, two mountain lodges, Begova Česma (1420 m) and Kopanki (1610 m), had been established. Additional infrastructure built after World War II included mountain lodges at Golemo Ezero and Golema Livada, and several recreational facilities and villas at various locations within the park.

== Description ==
Pelister was the first national park in Yugoslavia, declared on November 30, 1948. It is the oldest and second largest national park in North Macedonia after Mavrovo. It is one of the leading tourist areas in the country, since it is a well-known ski resort, along with Ohrid, Prespa, Dojran, Popova Šapka, and Kruševo.

== Geography and geology ==
Pelister National Park encompasses the northern sections of the Baba mountain massif, at altitudes ranging from 891 to 2601 metres above sea level. It covers 17,150 hectares, constituting about 43.4% of the entire mountain massif. The park features distinct geological formations from multiple geological eras, dominated by Pelister granite and green shales from the Ordovician and Palaeozoic periods. Glacial and periglacial geomorphological formations, unusual for this latitude, include cirques, moraines, granite block streams, and nivation hollows, making it a unique site for geological and geomorphological studies. Baba Mountain is the third-highest mountain range in North Macedonia and covers approximately 436 km². Geologically, the massif belongs to the western Macedonian geotectonic zone and represents the southernmost part of the Rhodope mountain system. Baba Mountain separates two major drainage basins, with rivers flowing towards the Adriatic Sea on one side and towards the Aegean Sea on the other.

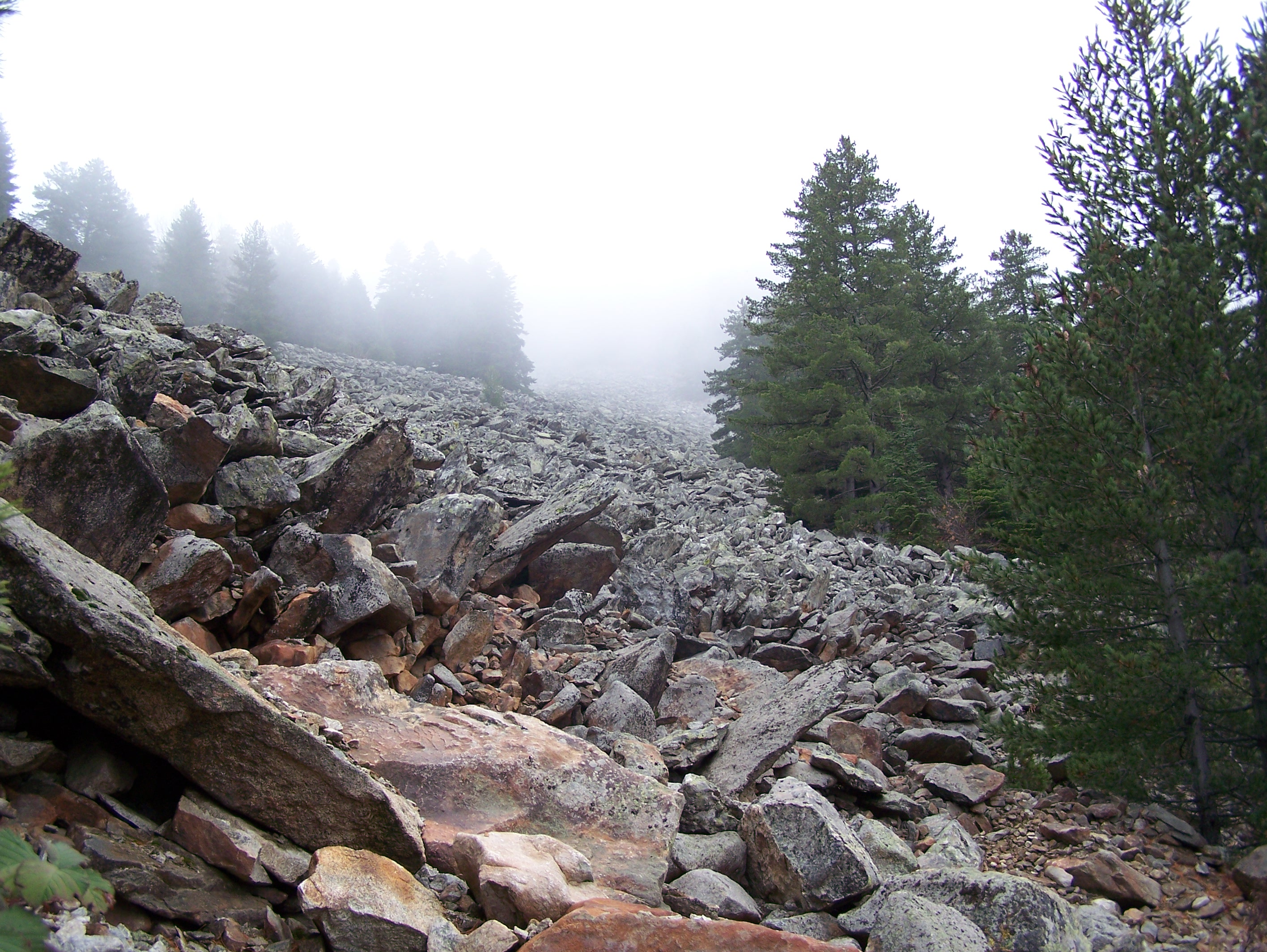
Stone rivers

The park is characterized by distinctive geological and glacial features formed during the Pleistocene epoch (about 1.8 million to 11,550 years ago). Characteristic formations are the "stone rivers" or moraines—accumulations of granite blocks and pieces of eruptive rocks like dolerite and gabbro, randomly piled due to repeated freezing and thawing cycles. Some of these stone rivers reach lengths up to 3 km. The park has a well-developed hydrographic network, including numerous springs, streams, mountain rivers, and two glacial lakes situated at elevations around 2,200 km.

== Biodiversity ==
Pelister National Park supports diverse ecosystems, including forests, alpine grasslands, and freshwater habitats, hosting many species protected under international conventions. Prominent species include mammals such as the grey wolf (Canis lupus) and European otter (Lutra lutra), birds like the bearded vulture (Gypaetus barbatus), and endemic flora like the Macedonian pine (Pinus peuce). Particularly notable are the extensive Macedonian pine forests—one of the best-developed habitats of this rare tree in the Balkans, forming distinctive mountainous and sub-alpine woodland communities. The park hosts more than 1,050 plant species, including about 900 angiosperms, 37 tree species, and 38 shrub species. Its most celebrated plant is the Macedonian pine (Pinus peuce), locally known as "molika", which the German botanist August Grisebach first described scientifically in 1843 after discovering it on Pelister. The Macedonian pine can grow to 30–50 m in height and typically forms extensive, compact forests between elevations of 1,200 to 1,600 m, though it can also be found up to 2,500 m. It usually grows on silicate substrates, rarely on limestone, and requires fresh, moist, and deep soils. The park contains some trees over 200 years old. As a Tertiary relic and endemic to the central Balkan region, the Macedonian pine's ecological and scientific significance was one of the primary reasons Pelister was declared a national park.

== Management and governance ==
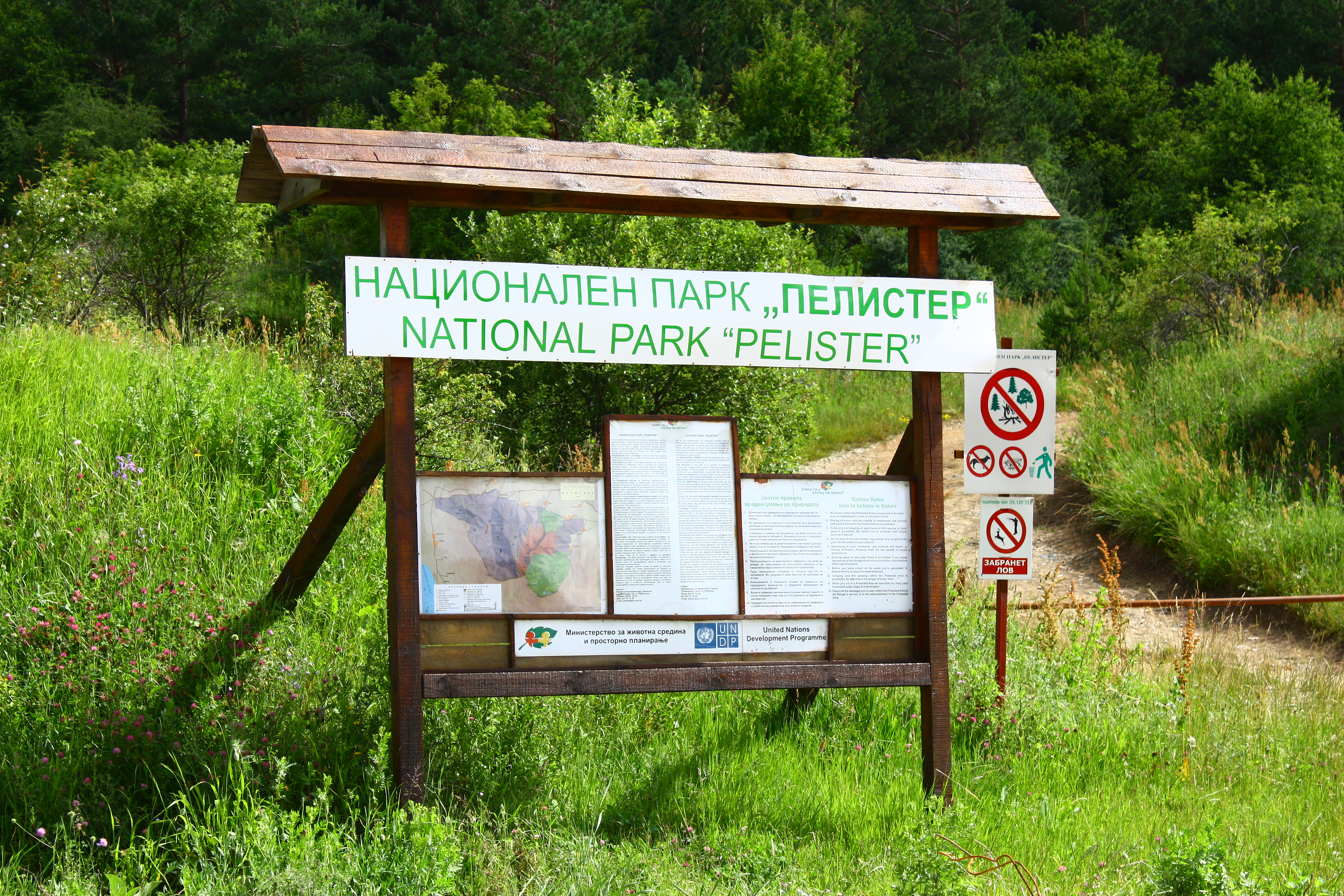
Sign at entrance

The management framework of Pelister National Park includes a top-down hierarchical system defined by national legislation, involving the Macedonian Ministry of Environment and Physical Planning, a management board, ranger service, and other advisory bodies. Despite legislative inflexibilities, the park authority employs innovative governance approaches by actively involving local communities, promoting local employment, and managing natural resource use sustainably, including the regulated harvesting of non-timber forest products such as blackberries and pine seeds.

Research conducted in 2006 identified successful community co-management practices in Pelister, balancing strict national rules with flexible local governance. The park authority provides essential community services such as waste management, free heating fuelwood, and infrastructure improvements. Employment opportunities have been created for locals as park rangers and foresters. Bottom-up community participation has also emerged through local NGOs that enhance community involvement in decision-making, promote nature-aware tourism, and conduct environmental education programs.

== Tourism ==
Pelister's management has placed significant emphasis on nature-aware tourism as a sustainable development strategy. Initiatives supported by international agencies such as the Swiss Agency for Development and Cooperation have helped establish local tourism infrastructure, training programs, and rural tourism opportunities. Villages around the park have adapted to tourism, transforming homes into tourist accommodations and setting up small enterprises, directly linking their economic well-being to environmental conservation.

Pelister National Park offers extensive infrastructure for outdoor recreation and sports tourism. This includes marked trails for hiking, climbing, cycling, horse riding, Nordic running, and skiing. The park has more than 40 trails, covering around 100 kilometres. Seasonal activities include the "Pelister’s Giant Slalom" skiing event in winter, the annual Dimitar Ilievski memorial mountain march in May, and mountain biking events in October. Facilities include lodges, ski lifts, picnic areas with benches, fountains, and viewpoints.

Annually, Pelister attracts around 30,000 visitors, predominantly domestic tourists from Bitola and surrounding regions, with about 15% international visitors. International tourists commonly arrive from the Netherlands, Israel, Germany, Italy, Poland, Czech Republic, Finland, Greece, and Albania, with some visitors from Australia, North America, and neighbouring Balkan countries.
