= Ministry of Environment and Physical Planning =

Government ministry of North Macedonia

The Ministry of Environment and Physical Planning (Macedonian: Министерство за животна средина и просторно планирање, romanized: Ministerstvo za životna sredina i prostorno planiranje; Albanian: Ministria për mjedisin jetësor dhe hapësirën e planifikimit) of the Republic of North Macedonia (MoEPP) is a governmental executive authority with its head office on the 10th, 11th, and 12th floors of the MRTV building in Skopje. It was created for the purpose of protecting human health and the environment by writing and enforcing regulations based on laws passed by the Macedonian Parliament and European Parliament
