= Baba (North Macedonia) =

Mountain in North Macedonia

- Pelister
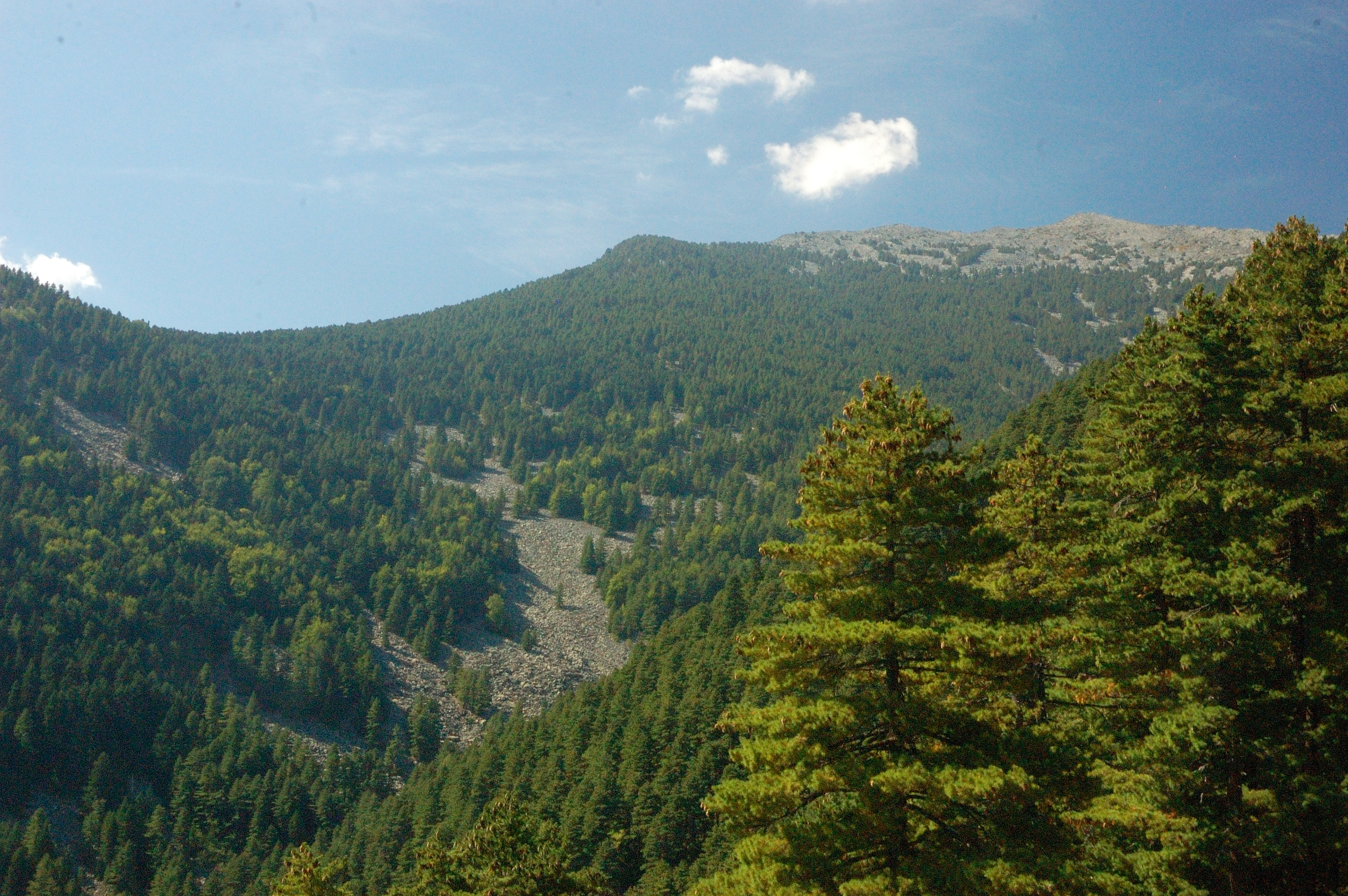
- Part of Baba mountain with its peak Pelister in the backdrop, Baba meaning Grandmother in Macedonian.

Highest point
- Elevation: 2,601 m (8,533 ft)
- Prominence: 1,516 m (4,974 ft)
- Listing: Ultra, Ribu
- Coordinates: 41°00′13″N 21°11′12″E

Geography
- Location within North Macedonia
- Location: Bitola Municipality, Pelagonia, North Macedonia

Baba (Macedonian: Баба; or Baba Mountain, Macedonian: Баба Планина, romanized: Baba Planina), also known by the name of its highest peak, Pelister (Macedonian: Пелистер), is a mountain in North Macedonia. The Pelister peak (2601 metres, or 8533 feet) overlooks the city of Bitola. Baba is the third highest mountain in North Macedonia. Other peaks besides Pelister are Dva Groba (2514 metres), Veternica (2420 metres), Musa (2350 metres), Ržana (2334 meters), Široka (2218 metres), Kozji Kamen (2199 metres), Griva (2198 metres) and Golema Čuka (2188 metres) in North Macedonia, and Belavoda (2.179 meters), Kirko. The Baba massif is the local watershed between rivers flowing towards the Adriatic in the west or the Aegean Sea in the east.

Pelister National Park's flora include the five-needle pine molika (Pinus peuce) - a unique species of tertiary age being present on only a few mountains in the Balkan Peninsula. Fauna in the area include: bears, roe deer, wolves, chamois, deer, wild boars, rabbits, several species of eagles, partridges, redbilled jackdaws, and the endemic Macedonian Pelagonia trout. In a comprehensive article published in 2002, Melovski and Godes reported that there are three large carnivores in North Macedonia which can be found in Baba and surrounds, the brown bear, the wolf and the lynx. Actual numbers at that time were difficult to estimate given that most reports came from non-scientific sources (surveys, hunters and anecdotal reports), however in 2002, it was estimated there were approximately 30 bears in N.P. Pelister and Galičica N.P hosting only 3-4. A larger number could apparently be found in the N.P Mavrovo. The numbers however may be significantly larger in today's climate given the protected status of bears in North Macedonia. In terms of wolves, there was an estimated total of 1200 wolves in the entire country of North Macedonia, with an estimated 54 lynx when the article was written.

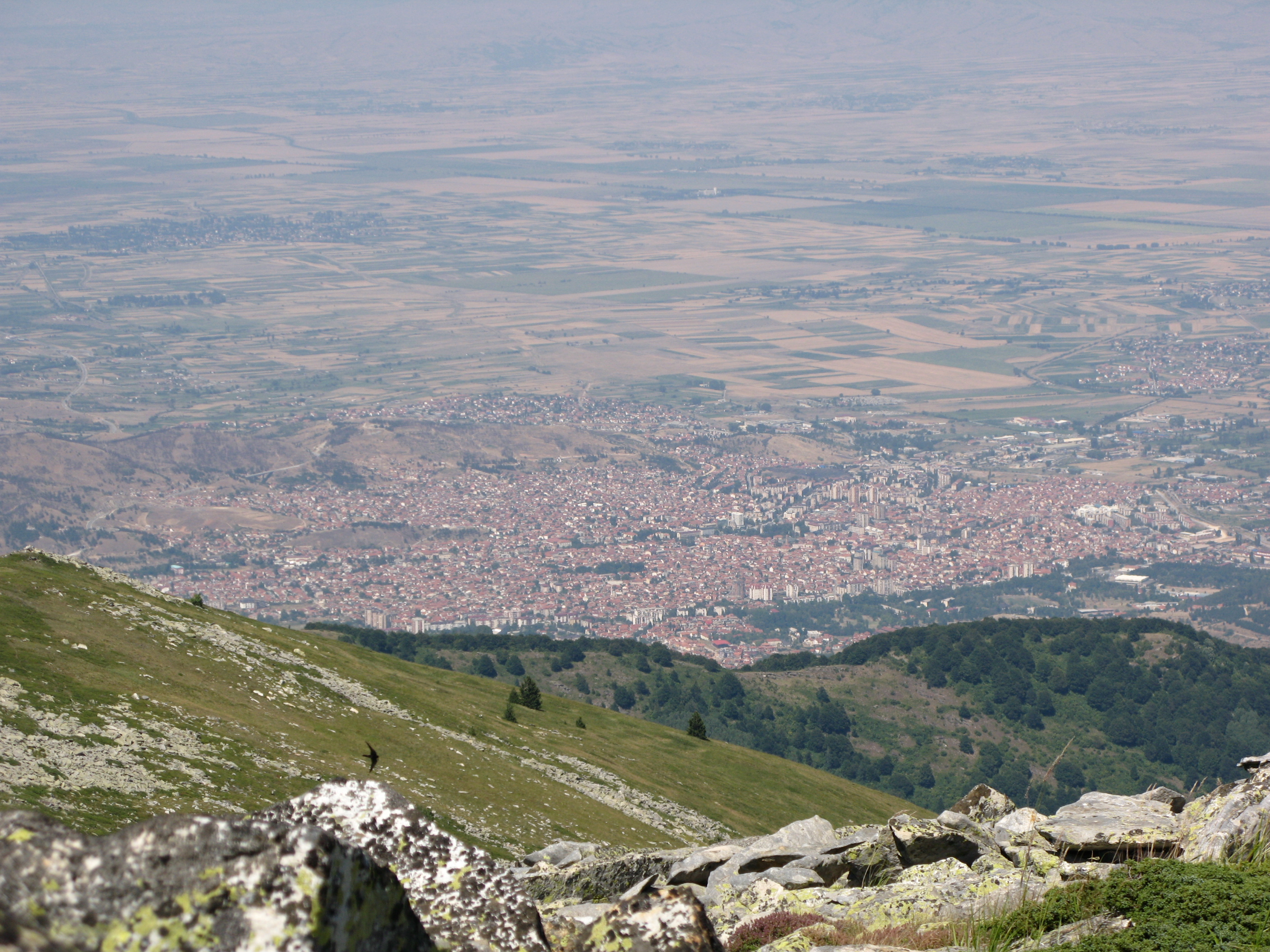
Bitola from Pelister

Pelister is the oldest and second largest national park in North Macedonia after Mavrovo. It is one of the leading tourist areas in the country, since it is a well-known ski resort, along with Ohrid, Prespa, Dojran, Popova Šapka, and Kruševo.

Pelister provides views of the Pelagonia valley, Lake Prespa, Nidže, Galičica, Jakupica, and the city of Bitola. Pelister is also one of the most southern mountains in the Balkans that has an alpine character.

Pelister is also known for its two mountain lakes, which are called Pelister's Eyes. The Big lake is 2,218 metres above the sea level while the Small lake is 2,180 metres high. Here are the sources of many rivers. The climate in Pelister National Park is diverse.

On the peaks, there is snow even in July, and in some places the new snow meets the old from previous years.

On Pelister mountain, there is a TV transmitter using an additionally guyed lattice steel mast as antenna tower.

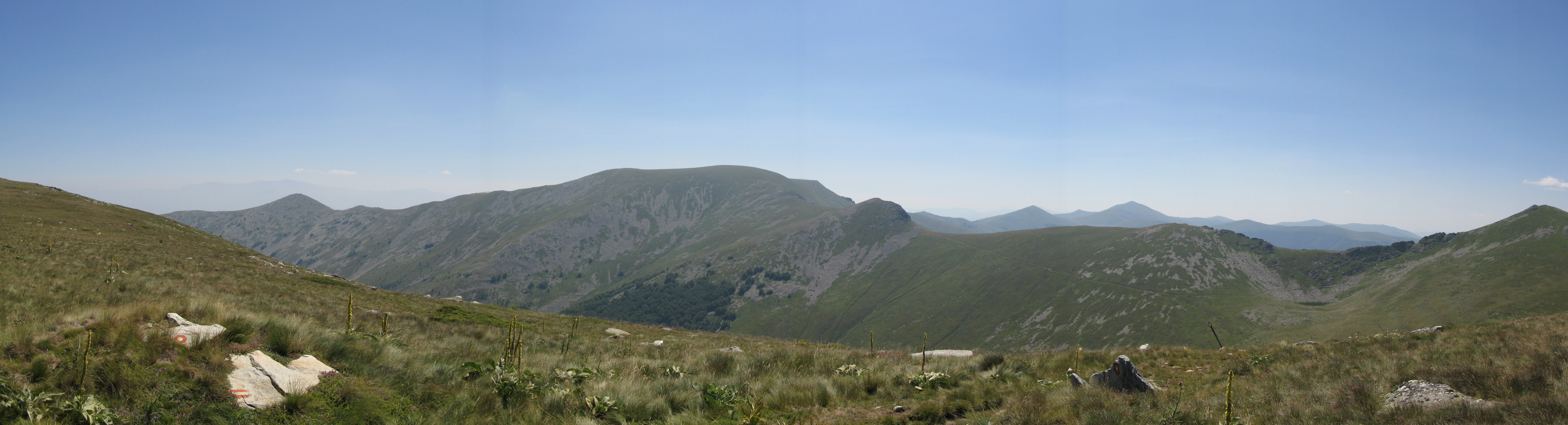
Pelister

== See also ==
- List of European ultra prominent peaks
- Pelister National Park
