= Galičica National Park =

National park in North Macedonia

- IUCN category II (national park)
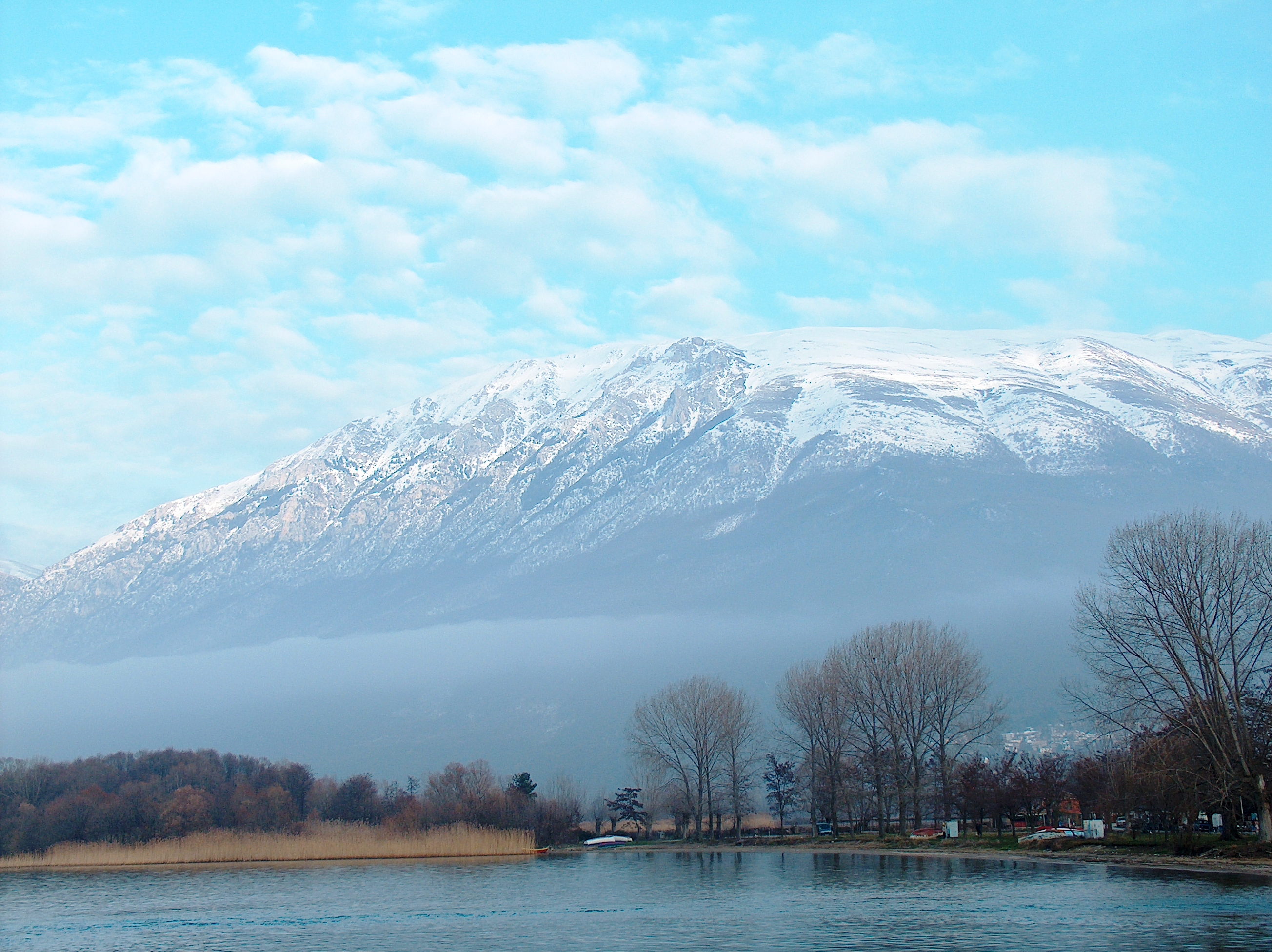
- Galičica Mountain from St. Naum Monastery

- Location within North Macedonia
- Interactive map of Galičica National Park
- Coordinates: 40°56′30″N 20°48′23″E
- Area: 22,750 hectares (227.5 km^{2})
- Established: 1958 November
- Website: www.galicica.org.mk

Galičica National Park (Macedonian: Национален парк Галичица) is a national park in North Macedonia.

== Geography ==
Galičica National Park encompasses the Galičica mountain range, parts of the eastern shore of Lake Ohrid and the western shore of Lake Prespa, and Golem Grad. To the south, it borders Albania's Prespa National Park.

Approximately two-thirds of the park's territory is included in the Natural and Cultural Heritage of the Ohrid Region, which was recognized as a UNESCO World Heritage Site in 1979.

The park contains various monuments and historical sites, including the Monastery of Saint Naum and the remains of stilt houses on the shores of Lake Ohrid.

== Gallery ==
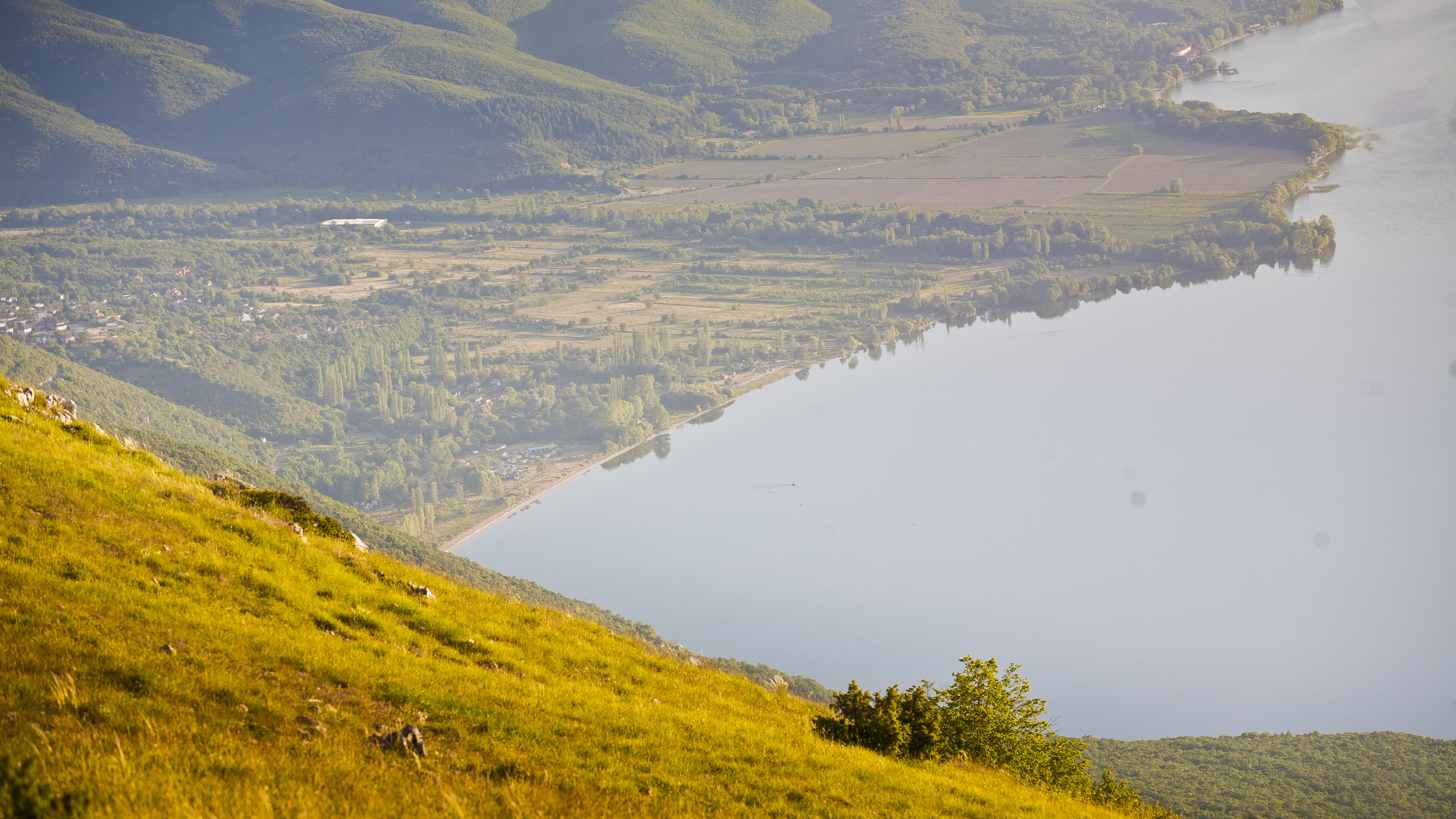
A view of Ljubaništa from Galičica

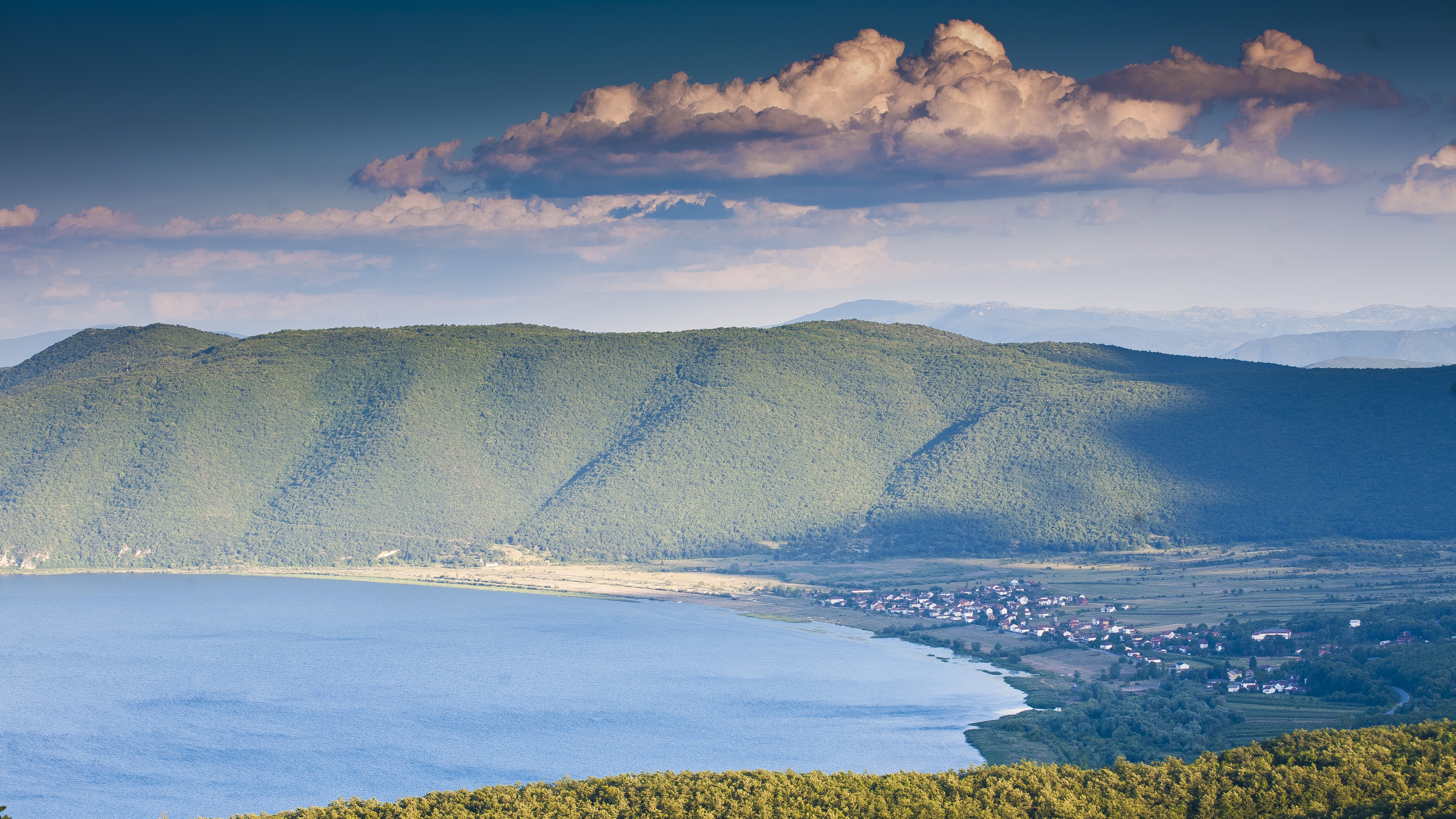
A view of Stenje from Galičica

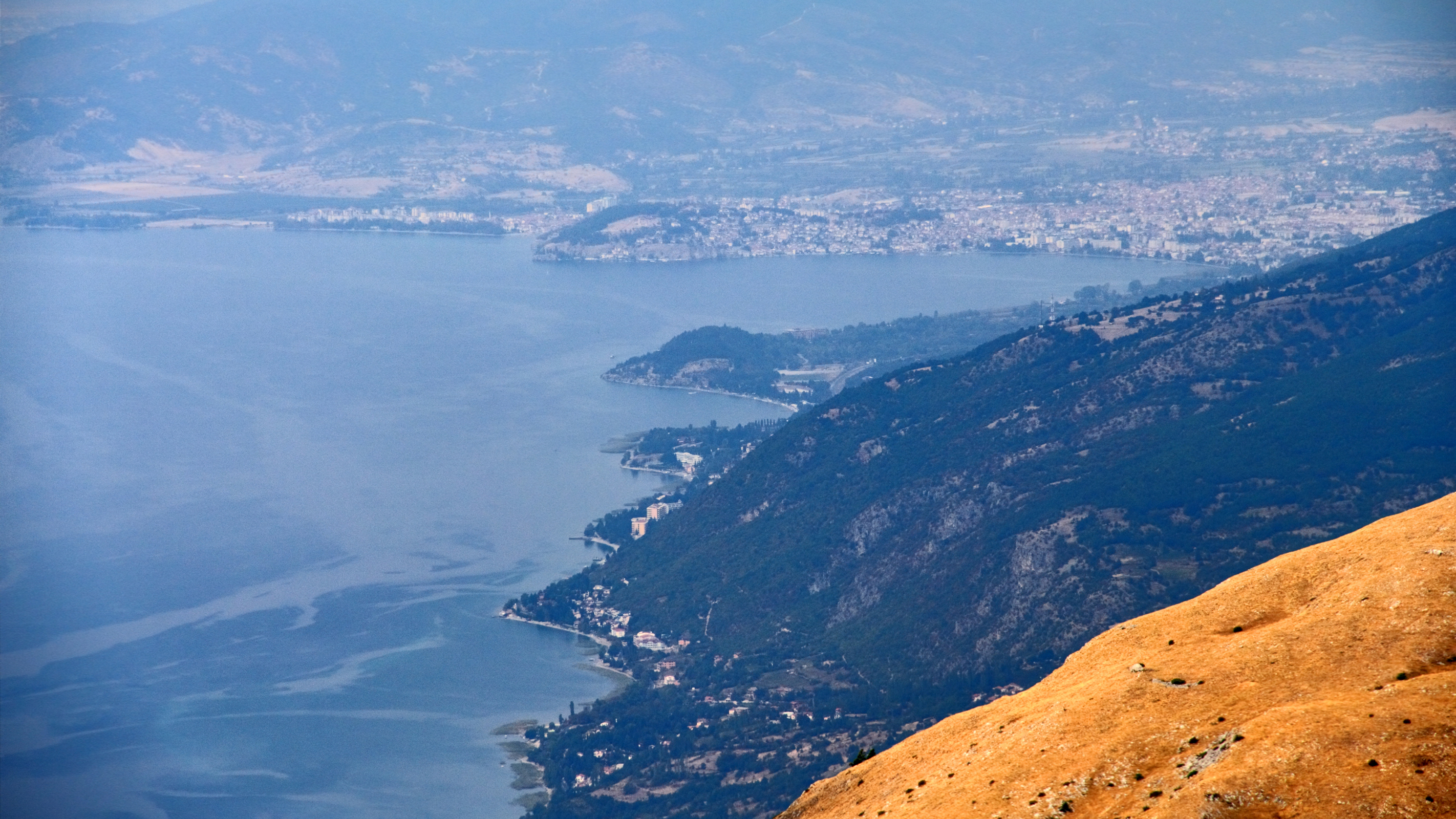
Lake Ohrid

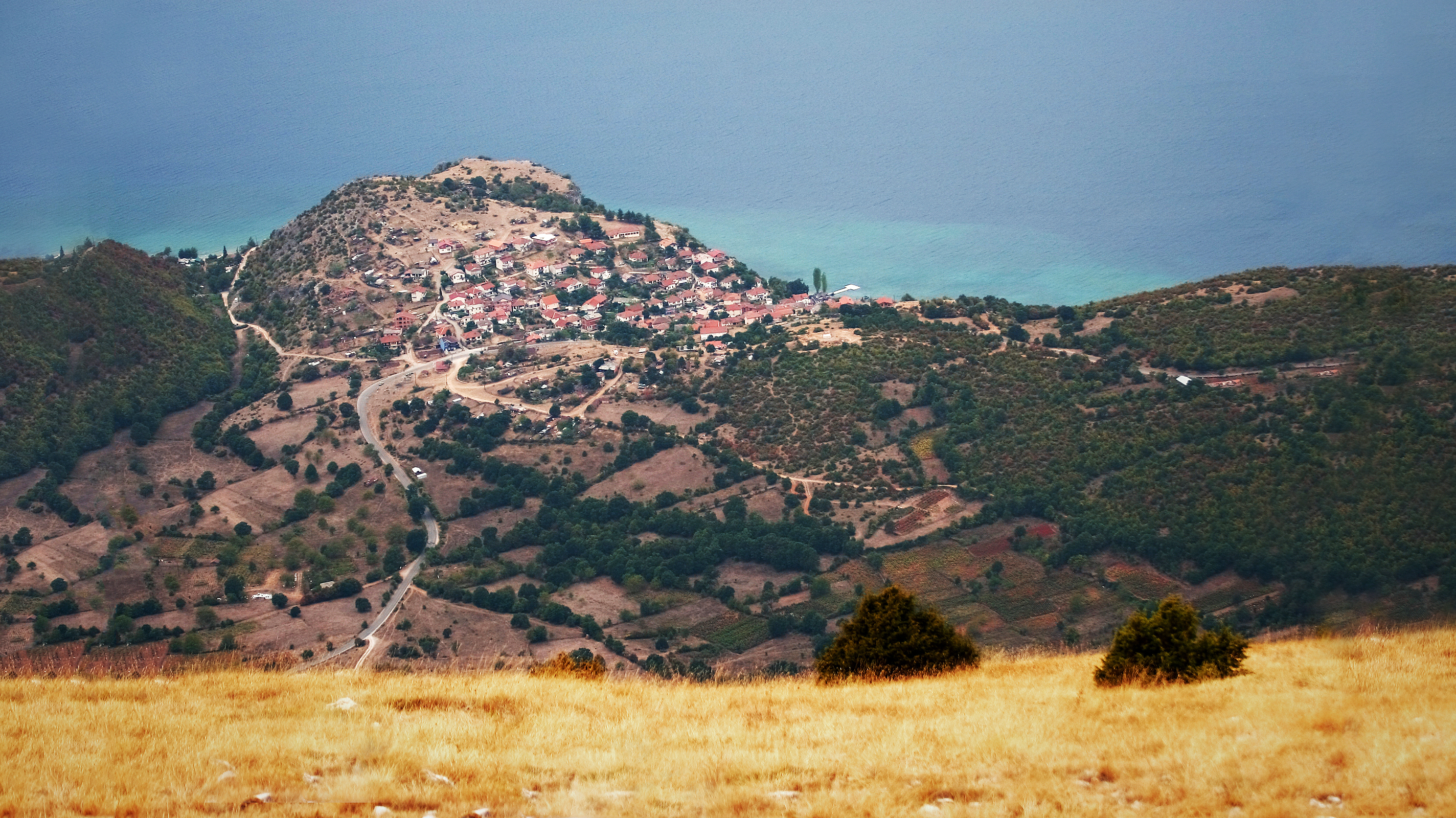
Trpejca

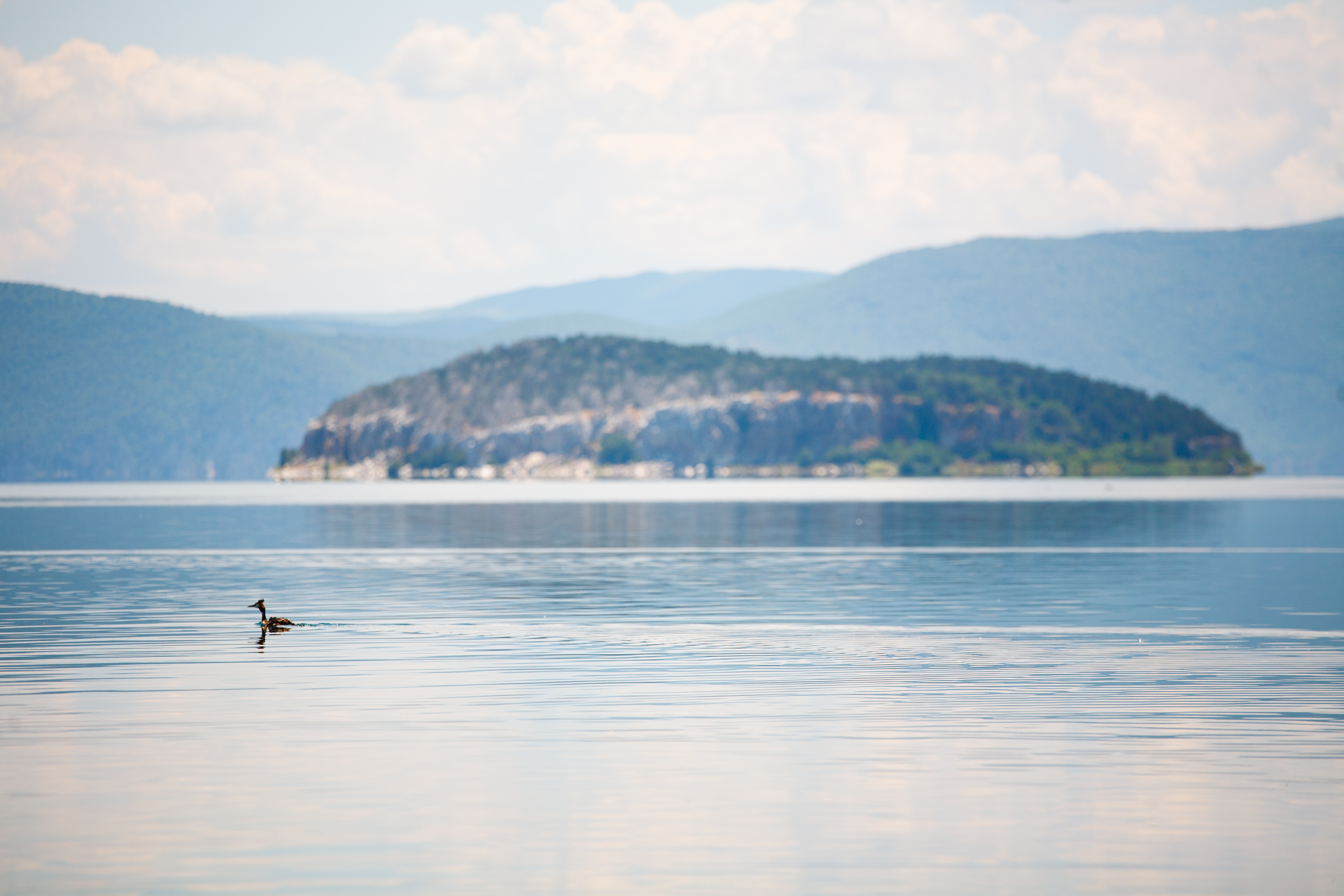
Golem Grad
