= Biosphere reserves of Albania =

The United Nations Educational, Scientific and Cultural Organization (UNESCO) Biosphere Reserves are significant institutions of international status as described in the established order of the World Network of Biosphere Reserves within the framework of the Man and the Biosphere Programme. The biosphere reserves specifically promote and support sustainable development for conservation of biological and cultural diversity.

The Ohrid-Prespa Transboundary Biosphere Reserve shared with North Macedonia is the only biosphere reserve in Albania. Designated in 2014, the reserve covers a territory of 446,244.52 ha (4,462.4452 km^{2}) with diverse landscapes ranging from high mountains to the coasts of the lakes of Ohrid and Prespa.

== Biosphere Reserves ==
The UNESCO Biosphere Reserves are environment-protected scientific-research institutions of international status recognised under the Man and the Biosphere (MAB) programme to promote sustainable development for conservation of biological and cultural diversity.

=== List of Biosphere Reserves ===
Biosphere Reserve	Designated	Area	Description	Image	Ref
Ohrid-Prespa; Transboundary; Biosphere Reserve	11 June 2014	446,244.52 ha (4,462.4452 km^{2})	The transboundary reserve is located on the Balkan Peninsula in southeastern Albania and southwestern North Macedonia.		

== See also ==
- World Heritage Sites in Albania
- Protected areas of Albania
