= Sateska =

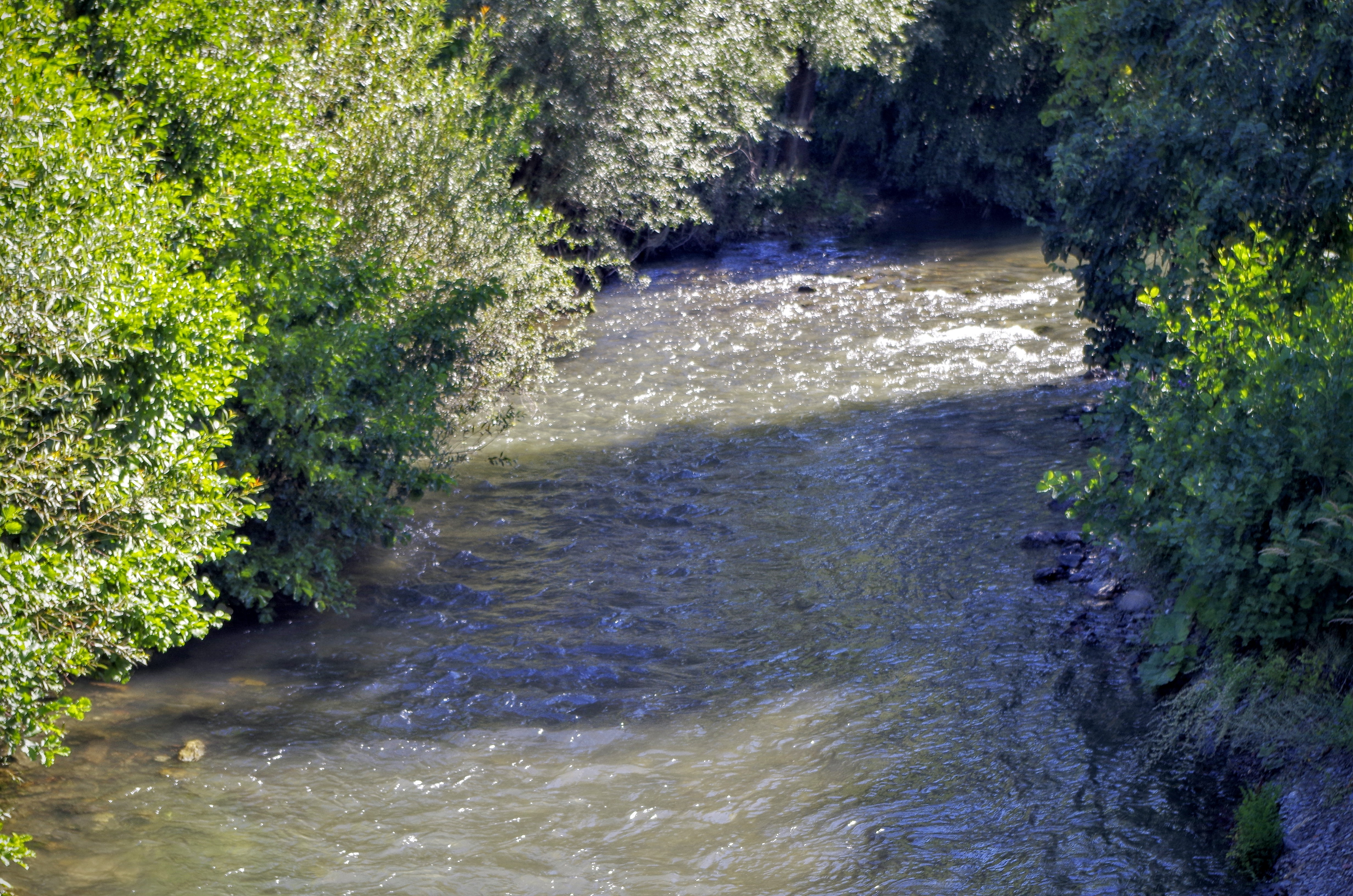

- Mouth location within North Macedonia

Location
- Country: Republic of North Macedonia

Physical characteristics
- Mouth
  - location: Lake Ohrid
  - coordinates: 41.1677°N 20.7269°E
- Length: 38 km (24 mi)

Basin features
- Progression: Black Drin→ Drin→ Adriatic Sea

The River Sateska is located in the south-west of North Macedonia. Currently a tributary of Lake Ohrid, it originally flowed directly into the River Black Drim but was re-routed in 1961–1962. It now accounts for 39.36% of the Lake Ohrid watershed and is consequently one of its most important tributaries.

== Artificial rerouting ==
In 1961/2, the River Sateska was diverted from its natural path into the River Black Drim and instead routed into Lake Ohrid, which it enters on the northern shore between the cities of Ohrid and Struga. The Lake Ohrid catchment was expanded by 460 square kilometers in the process. The diversion was motivated by three main considerations:

- to reduce the sediment load upon Globočica Reservoir;
- to secure the hydroelectric potential of dams on the River Black Drim; and
- to drain Struga Marsh wetland areas.

== Environmental impact ==
Since the 1960s, the River Sateska has been a major source of pollution and other negative anthropogenic impact upon Lake Ohrid, which is one of the most biodiverse inland waters on the planet. At peak times, the river can bring up to 129 tonnes of suspended material into the lake per day, which interferes with reed belts and spawning grounds for fish, a situation that has deteriorated after the abandonment of measures to reduce erosion.

The River Sateska is also the largest source of phosphorus inputs to Lake Ohrid and the second highest contributor of nitrogen (29%), both of which can instigate eutrophication processes. Indeed, the mouth of the Sateska holds some of the lowest quality water in all Lake Ohrid and displays evidence of eutrophication. Water oxygen levels have been influenced and a shift in species composition has been observed.

Due to environmental concerns, the World Heritage Committee has requested the Republic of Macedonia to explore options to re-divert the Sateska back to the River Black Drim.

== See also ==
- List of rivers of North Macedonia
