= List of rivers of North Macedonia =

Map of North Macedonia with main rivers.

Drainage basins in North Macedonia. Aegean sea: Vardar Struma Adriatic sea: Ohrid Lake & Drin Prespa Lake Black sea: Danube

This is a list of rivers of North Macedonia.

== By drainage basin ==
This list is arranged by drainage basin, with respective tributaries indented under each larger stream's name.

=== Aegean Sea ===
- Vardar
  - Treska
    - Golema Reka
  - Lepenac
    - Nerodime
  - Kadina River
  - Pčinja
    - Kriva Reka
    - Kumanovska Reka
  - Topolka
  - Babuna
    - Crnička Reka
  - Bregalnica
    - Zrnovska Reka
    - Lakavica
    - Otinja
  - Crna Reka
    - Šemnica
    - Dragor
    - Raec
  - Bošava
    - Dosznica
  - Stragarnica
  - Anska Reka
  - Konska Reka
  - Pena
- Struma (in Bulgaria)
  - Lebnica
  - Strumica
    - Stara Reka

=== Adriatic Sea ===
- Drim (in Albania)
  - Black Drin
    - Sateska
      - Golema Reka
    - Radika
      - Derven
      - Ribnička
        - Dlaboka

=== Black Sea ===
- Danube (in Serbia)
  - Južna Morava (in Serbia)
    - Binačka Morava

== Drainage basins in North Macedonia ==
| Drainage basin | Area in km^{2} | Area in % | Main river |
|---|---|---|---|
| Aegean Sea | 22 319 | 86,80 | Vardar |
| includes: | 20 535 | 79,86 | Vardar |
| | 1535 | 5,97 | Strumica |
| | 129 | 0,50 | Lebnica |
| | 120 | 0,47 | Lake Doiran |
| Adriatic Sea | 3350 | 13,03 | Black Drin |
| Black Sea | 44 | 0,17 | Binačka Morava |
