= Dragor (disambiguation) =

Dragor may refer to:

- Dragør, a town of Region Hovedstaden, Denmark
- Dragør Municipality, a municipality of Region Hovedstaden, Denmark
- Dragor River, in North Macedonia
- Dragor Hill, in Antarctica
- Dragor, Bulgaria, a village in Pazardzhik Municipality, Bulgaria
