= Natural and Cultural Heritage of the Ohrid Region =

The Natural and Cultural Heritage of the Ohrid Region refers to two different sites:

- Natural and Cultural Heritage of the Ohrid Region (Albania), located at Pogradec on the Albanian side of Lake Ohrid
- Natural and Cultural Heritage of the Ohrid Region (Macedonia), located at Ohrid on the Macedonian side of Lake Ohrid
