= Drim River (disambiguation) =

Drim River may refer to:

- Drim River, the longest river in Albania or either of its two headwaters:
  - Black Drim River
  - White Drim River
