= Ohrid-Prespa Transboundary Biosphere Reserve =

Biosphere reserve in Albania and North Macedonia

- Прекуграничен биосферен резерват „Охрид-Преспа“ Oher – Prespe, Rezerve Ndërkufitare Biosfere
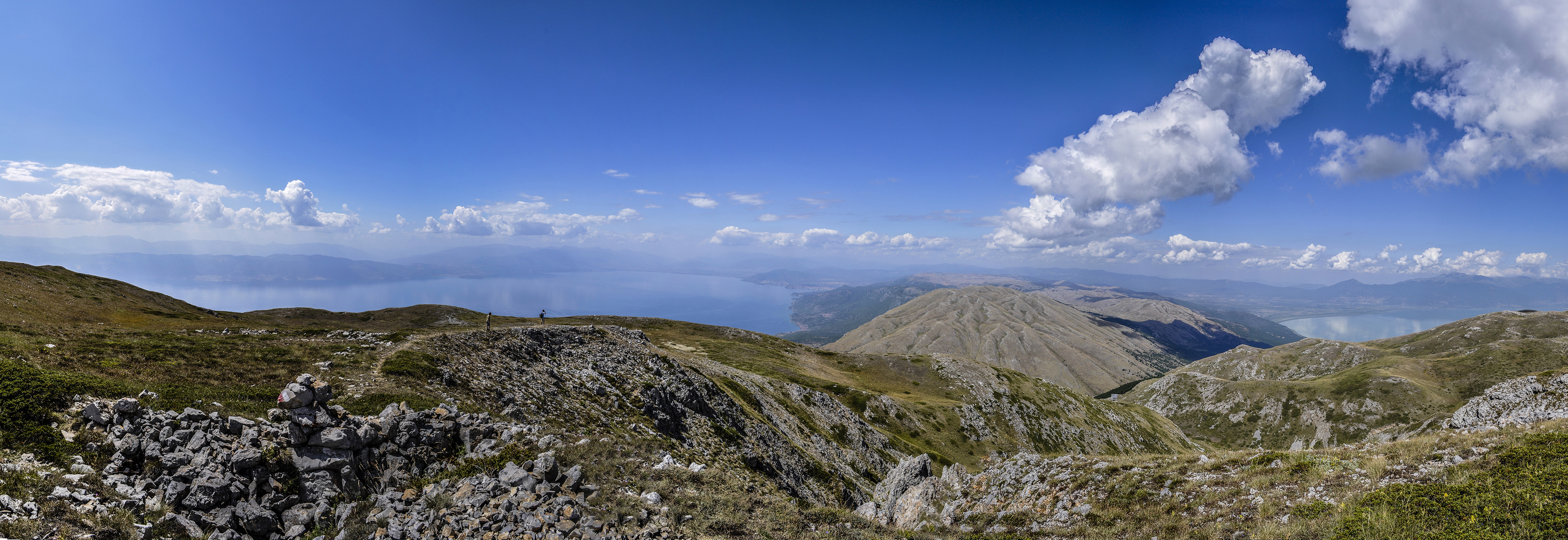
- View of mount Galičica and Lake Ohrid and Lake Prespa, the core area of the reserve
- Interactive map of Ohrid-Prespa; Transboundary Biosphere Reserve
- Coordinates: 40°59′36″N 20°51′43″E
- Created: 2014
- Established: 2014

Ohrid-Prespa Transboundary Biosphere Reserve (Macedonian: Прекуграничен биосферен резерват „Охрид-Преспа“, romanized: Prekugraničen biosferen rezervat „Ohrid-Prespa“; Albanian: Oher – Prespe, Rezerve Ndërkufitare Biosfere) is a biosphere reserve encompassing the area of Lake Ohrid and Lake Prespa, on North Macedonia and Albania.

The reserve was declared in June 2014 and comprises a combination of water bodies and surrounding mountain reliefs, covering an area of 446,244.52 hectares (1,722.96 sq mi).

== Declaration ==
The Ohrid-Prespa area was declared a biosphere reserve on 11 June 2014 at the UNESCO international commission session held in Jönköping, Sweden. The proposal was made by the Lake Ohrid Bilateral Secretariat, together with the UNESCO national commissions of Macedonia and Albania, as well as their respective environment ministries.

== Ecology ==
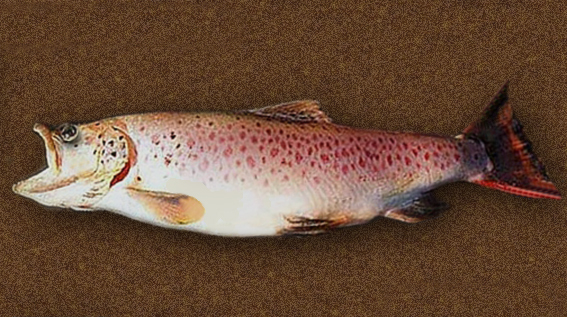
Ohrid trout, endemic species of Lake Ohrid

The Ohrid-Prespa Transboundary Reserve includes various ecosystems, ranging from the mountainous areas around the lakes, to the temperate sub-tropical forests found at lower altitudes around the water basins. The Ohrid-Prespa lake system is one of the largest in Europe of its kind. Both lakes possess exceptional value on a national and international level because of their geological and biological uniqueness. Lake Ohrid is renowned for its endemic species (over 200), five of which are limited to microecosystems within the lake itself. Ten of the seventeen fish species are endemic, including the Ohrid trout (Salmo letnica).

There are also endemic and unique forest areas such as that covered by the Macedonian pine (Pinus peuce).

Mammals represent the second most important group of species in the Ohrid-Prespa Transboundary Reserve, whose protection is crucial to the reserve. They include the Balkan mole (Talpa stankovici), Balkan lynx (Lynx lynx martinoi), gray wolf (Canis lupus), the brown bear (Ursus arctos) and others. The Balkan lynx is an exceptionally rare species, holding especially high symbolic value. One bird species in the area of particular note is the Dalmatian pelican (Pelecanus crispus). The Prespa region is the home to about 260 bird species, representing more than half the bird species in Europe. About 140 species nest in this area.

== Socioeconomic characteristics ==
The Ohrid-Prespa Transboundary Reserve has an estimated population of 455,000, representing an area of cultural, ethnic and religious diversity. The settlements are situated only in the transitional areas and include demographically relatively stable settlements, whereas other populated areas (especially the cities of Ohrid and Struga on the shore of Lake Ohrid and Pogradec in Albania), receive many thousands of visitors during the tourist season.

In Albania, the main economic activity of the local populations is agriculture, still present in the transitional area and some parts of the buffer zone. More recently, the food processing industry has seen significant development (especially in Korçë), in parallel with traditional agriculture, giving rise to new settlements.

The most important sector of development in the area of the reserve is the primary sector. In many areas, individual smallholding family farms are replaced with a more intense type of production (such as the large orchards in the area of Resen). In some mountainous parts, forestry is also a significant economic activity. Stockbreeding is also important throughout the transboundary region.

Tourism is the key area of development of the entire transboundary biosphere reserve. The city of Ohrid alone receives a large number of visitors during the high season, six times that of its native population (42,000).

Fishing is another key activity with ecological and economic impacts on the lakes.

== Major populated places in the area ==
North Macedonia

- Cities: Ohrid, Struga, Resen, Bitola
- Municipalities: Debarca, Vevčani

Albania

- Korçë, Pogradec, Bilisht, Maliq
