= Studenčište Marsh =

Marsh in North Macedonia

- IUCN category IV (habitat/species management area)
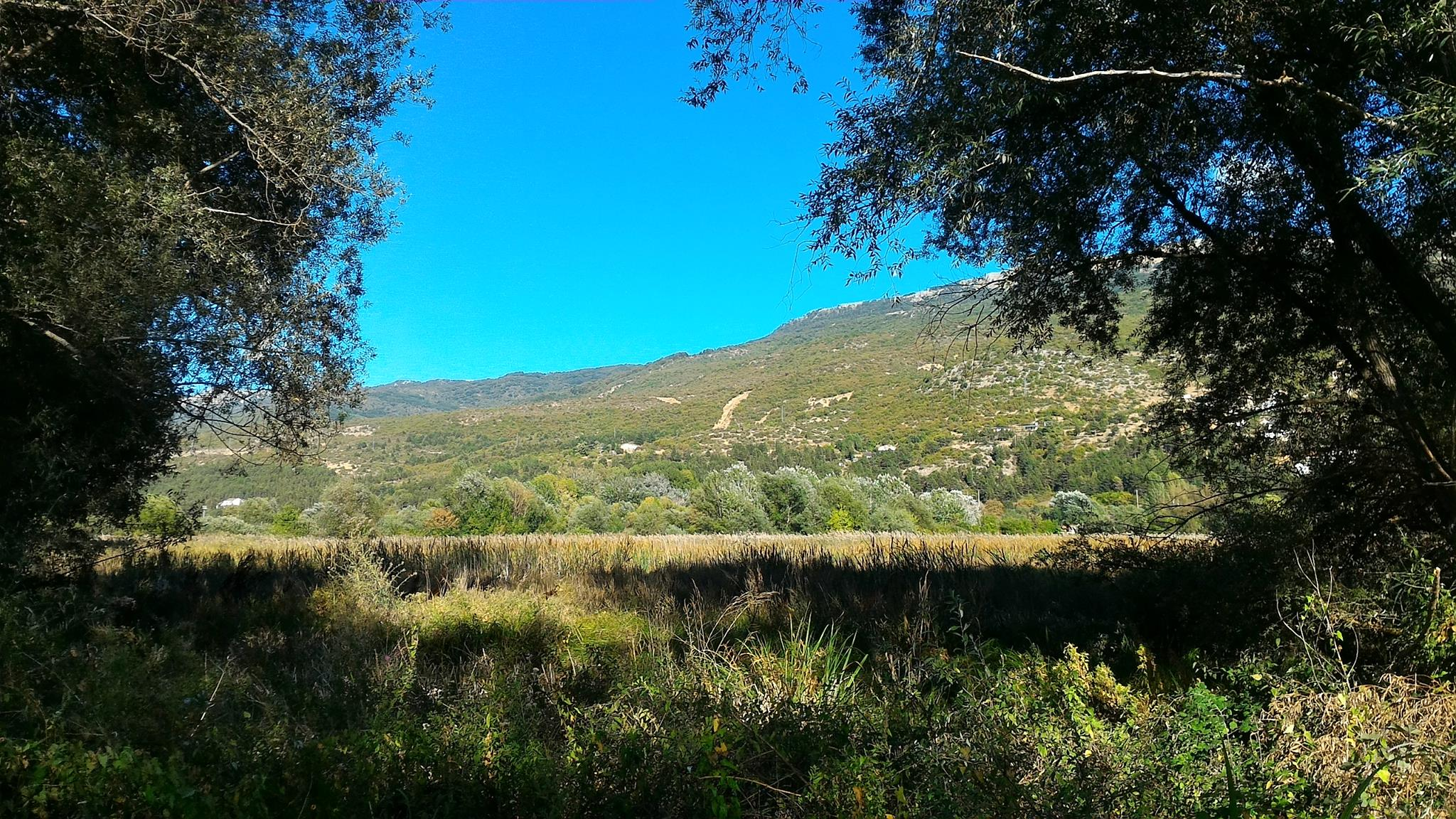

- Location within North Macedonia
- Location: North Macedonia, Lake Ohrid
- Nearest city: Ohrid
- Coordinates: 41°06′01″N 20°48′37″E
- Established: 15 February 2021

Studenchishte Marsh (Macedonian: Студенчишко Блато) is the last remains of a previously extensive wetland habitat on the eastern shore of ancient Lake Ohrid in North Macedonia. It is also the final major coastline wetland at Lake Ohrid and one of only seven marshes with relict communities that still exist in North Macedonia. With several millennia of natural history, it is a site of key conservation interest and part of the Lake Ohrid Wetland of International Importance under the Ramsar Convention.

== Flora and Fauna ==
Furnishing habitat for a wide variety of species, Studenchishte Marsh harbors flora and fauna that differ substantially to those of Lake Ohrid, which is one of the most biodiverse inland waters on Earth. Consequently, the marsh contributes significantly to the biological, ecosystemic and habitat diversity of the Ohrid region, which is a UNESCO World Heritage Site in part due to the Outstanding Universal Value of its nature.

Historically, Studenchishte Marsh was one of Lake Ohrid's most important nesting sites for birds and spawning locations for cyprinid fish, although much of this significance has been lost in recent years due to a range of anthropogenic pressures. Nonetheless, while far fewer birds nest at Studenchishte than in previous times, its avifauna still boasts 79 species, and Studenchishte Canal, which marks the northern border of the wetland area, remains inhabited by 17 kinds of fish, including several that are endemic to the Ohrid region.

Among the minimum nine varieties of amphibian to be found in the area, the Macedonian Crested Newt (Triturus macedonicus) and Yellow-Bellied Toad (Bombina variegata) are noteworthy. Reptile and mammal fauna is insubstantially researched, although the European pond turtle and three species of snake are confirmed in the former category, and otter, fox, beech marten and European polecat in the latter. Studenchishte is likely home to several rodent and bat species, yet precise data is lacking.

Among invertebrates, Studenchishte Marsh and its surrounding coastal waters display 16% of the Gastropoda, 20% of the Tricladida, 35% of the Oligochaeta and 22.5% of the Chironomidae found at Lake Ohrid, while the 9 planarian taxa of the wetland include several that are endemic to Lake Ohrid's coastal springs. Beetles, one of the few insects to have been studied in detail, appear in 39 different varieties, some of which have not been recorded anywhere else in North Macedonia, and biological diversity is further boosted by 34 kinds of dragon and damselflies, 19% of which are specific to Southern Europe.

In terms of plants, Studenchishte supports a wide variety of habitats including alkaline marshes and fens, and semi-natural wet meadows. The alkaline fens have higher nutrient levels, which encourages greater plant and animal diversity. The result is a flora that displays 50% of the total diversity of plant associations recorded for marshes in North Macedonia. In addition, ten rare and relict species have been recorded in the location, indicating that it has refugial qualities for wetland flora. Half of these are now believed to have been extirpated from the location, but others such as Carex elata may offer a source from which to rehabilitate other degraded wetlands in North Macedonia. Nationally vulnerable and endangered species according to IUCN criteria, such as Water Caltrop (Trapa natans) and Floating Fern (Salvinia natans), are also important components of the flora.

Recently, significant populations of endemic diatom species have been found at Studenchishte, including species that are believed to be new to science.

== Ecosystem Services ==
Studenchishte Marsh instigates benefits to the local region beyond habitat provision for biodiversity. Its 5-meter deep peatlands, which have accumulated over 5,000 years, provide carbon storage and its function as a natural filter prevents nutrients from entering Lake Ohrid and thereby buffers against eutrophication. This is significant due to the research opportunities presented by Lake Ohrid's unique ecosystem, which depends on its highly specific water conditions. In previous years, as a location for spawning fish, Studenchishte Marsh was additionally a contributor to Lake Ohrid fisheries, although this function has been severely depleted. The wetland acts as natural mitigation against flooding.

== Threats ==
Much of Studenchishte Marsh's previous surface area has been converted into farmland, roads or buildings. It has been further degraded by large-scale construction of tourism facilities. Several of the channels that once connected it with Lake Ohrid have been disrupted. The urbanization of beaches has caused the depletion of reed belts. Additionally, high volumes of construction waste have been deposited in the wetland, covering six hectares. As a result, its ability to shelter and raise fish populations has been almost totally lost alongside much of its importance for birds.

Modification of the General Urban Plan for the City of Ohrid 2014-2024 envisaged draining the area almost completely and replacing it with tourism accommodation, recreation facilities, a marina and a sports center. These intentions sparked international attention and the 2015 establishment of a citizen initiative, Ohrid SOS, which was created in opposition to the plans. Global scientific organizations such as the Society of Wetland Scientists (SWS) and International Society of Limnology (SIL) also spoke out on the issue.

In 2017, proposals to drain and develop Studenchishte were reversed although local government plans for a marina continue to lack clarification.

== Protected Status ==
Designation for Studenchishte Marsh as a protected natural area has been suggested for decades, although it has never been completed at a national level. An expert study on the wetland proposed a 63.97-hectare area to receive Monument of Nature (Category III) status in 2012.

However, a 2020 valorisation conducted as part of the legally required process for establishment of a protected area at Studenchishte has reduced the envisaged protection category to Nature Park (IUCN Category IV), which, unlike a Monument of Nature, would not require a buffer zone under Macedonian law. Compared with the 2012 proposal, it also foresees contracting the overall boundaries to 60.23 hectares and decreasing internal Zones of Strict Protection and Zones of Active Management to just 34% of the area.

An Ohrid SOS proposal endorsed by the Society of Wetlands Scientists for Studenchishte Marsh and Lake Ohrid to apply for proclamation as a Wetland of International Importance under the Ramsar Convention was submitted to the Macedonian government in 2017. At its 60th session on March 20, 2018, the government took the decision to proceed with nomination of Studenchishte as both a Monument of Nature (IUCN Category III) and Ramsar Site (alongside Lake Ohrid). Ramsar status was confirmed in February 2021, but the wetland has still not been proclaimed a protected area at the national level.

== Declaration on the Protection of the Lake Ohrid Ecosystem ==
The Declaration on the Protection of the Lake Ohrid Ecosystem, passed unanimously by 45 attending members of the Society of Wetland Scientists Europe Chapter at its 13th annual meeting from 30 April to 4 May 2018, makes specific reference to the critical importance of Studenchishte Marsh for its species composition and rarity, undisturbed peat layers, and ecosystem services. It calls for an urgent action plan to protect and revitalize the wetland with the long-term aim of rewetting agricultural areas.
