= Society of Wetland Scientists =

Scientific professional organization

- Founded: March 1980
- Founder: Richard Macomber
- Type: Scientific society
- Purpose: Wetlands, science, education and management
- Location: Washington DC, United States
- Members: 3,000+
- Key people: Becky Pierce (President); Andy Baldwin (President Elect); Eric Stein (Past President); Yvonne Vallette (Treasurer); Kai Rains (Secretary General)
- Website: www.sws.org

The Society of Wetland Scientists (SWS) is an international, professional non-profit organization whose mission is to promote best practices in wetland research, education, conservation, preservation, restoration, and management. The SWS vision is to ensure that wetlands are understood, their importance recognized, and sound wetland science is used as a guide for wetland professionals and the general public to collaborate on research, conservation, preservation, restoration, and management of wetlands in our changing environment. Based in Washington, DC, United States, SWS has 3000+ members worldwide, and the membership is open to anyone with an interest in wetlands.

SWS has fifteen regional chapters around the world: Asia, Canada, Central, China, Europe, International, Mid-Atlantic, New England, North Central, Oceania, Pacific Northwest, Rocky Mountain, South Atlantic, South Central, and Western. SWS has ten sections that organize symposia and workshops for the SWS Annual Meeting: Biogeochemistry, Education, Global Change Ecology, Peatlands, Public Policy and Regulation, Ramsar, Student, Wetland Restoration, Wildlife, and Women in Wetlands.

SWS has been managed by an association management company, MCI-Group, since 2021. SWS is associated with the SWS Professional Certification Program, which works "to identify qualified individuals to assess and manage the Nation’s resources." The certification program is run by a separate office and collects separate membership dues. Certification signifies that the academic and work experience of a Professional Wetland Scientist (PWS) meets the standards expected by their peers as a practicing wetland professional and provides acknowledgment to their peers of adherence to standards of professional ethics with regard to the conduct and practice of wetland science. PWS certification is awarded for those meeting both educational and experience requirements. Wetland Professional in Training (WPIT) is considered a preliminary step for persons who meet the basic educational requirements but not the experience requirements.

SWS was founded in March 1980 by Richard Macomber, a biologist with the United States Army Corps of Engineers Board of Rivers and Harbors. That same year, the first SWS annual meeting was held in Tampa, Florida, United States. The first president of SWS was James F. Parnell from the University of North Carolina Wilmington. The first issue of Wetlands, the society's premier international journal, was published in 1981 as proceedings for the annual meeting. Since that time, Wetlands has evolved into a quarterly journal, communicating research to an expanding community of international and interdisciplinary wetland professionals. It is currently published by Springer on behalf of the SWS.

== Lake Ohrid and Studenchishte Marsh ==
Since 2015, the SWS Europe Chapter has been encouraging more robust protection for the Republic of North Macedonia's Lake Ohrid, one of the most biodiverse inland waters on Earth, and the last remains of a previously extensive wetland along its shore, Studenchishte Marsh. Alongside supporting an initiative by local organizations EDEN and Ohrid SOS to establish both areas jointly as a Wetland of International Importance under the Ramsar Convention. An Ohrid SOS proposal endorsed by the Society of Wetlands Scientists for Studenchishte Marsh and Lake Ohrid to apply for proclamation as a Wetland of International Importance under the Ramsar Convention was submitted to the Macedonian government in 2017. At its 60th session on March 20, 2018, the government took the decision to proceed with nomination of Studenchishte as both a Monument of Nature (IUCN Category III) and Ramsar Site (alongside Lake Ohrid). Ramsar status was confirmed in February 2021. SWS Europe Chapter has also released a Declaration on the Protection of the Lake Ohrid Ecosystem, which outlines the importance of the location and proposes various measures for its protection, revitalization and sustainable development.
