= Mimoza Nestorova-Tomić =

Macedonian architect (1929–2024)

- Born: June 21, 1929; Struga, Kingdom of Yugoslavia
- Died: May 22, 2024 (aged 94); Skopje, North Macedonia
- Education: University of Belgrade
- Occupations: Architect, urban planner, designer
- Known for: Reconstruction of Skopje after the 1963 earthquake Design of the Museum of Macedonia
- Notable work: Stara Charshija restoration Museum of Macedonia; Albert Einstein Street housing block
- Spouse: Lyubomir Tomić
- Awards: Andreja Damjanov Award (2011)

Mimoza Nestorova-Tomić (21 June 1929, Struga, Kingdom of Yugoslavia, – 22 May 2024, Skopje, North Macedonia) was a Macedonian architect, planner, and urban designer, who played a significant role in the masterplan and reconstruction of Skopje after the 1963 earthquake. Initially she worked specifically in the team for social planning with Polservice, the Polish consultants, alongside Kenzo Tange, the winner of a United Nations international competition for the reconstruction of Skopje. She got the job as an independent designer and manager of City Office of Urbanism in Skopje in 1965. In the period 1986–1989 Nestorova-Tomić was the director of City Office of Urbanism in Skopje.

As a female architect working within socialist Yugoslavia, Nestorova-Tomić presented a different trajectory to her counterparts in the West.

== Early life and education ==
Nestorova-Tomić was born on 21 June 1929 in Struga, a small town in then Kingdom of Yugoslavia, where her family provided a privileged support for her childhood and education. She attended the Ohrid High School (rather than her local school in her hometown Struga). Her family financed the first three years of her studies in Belgrade, the post second World War capital of the Federation of Yugoslavia, until she received a scholarship. She completed her architectural studies with the major project on ‘Urban resolution for the touristic district Trsija in Ohrid,’ under the supervision of Professor Branko Maksimovic in Belgrade. This sense of a world open for her education and learning became a pattern in Nestorova-Tomić career and she travelled widely.

After graduating from the Faculty of Architecture at the Technical College in Belgrade, she returned to her family in Macedonia.

== Early work ==
The architectural career of Mimoza Nestorova-Tomić is summarized in the first volume of the 2004 encyclopedic publication Градителите во Македонија (City Builders in Macedonia), which covers the pioneering period of architectural production in the Republic of Macedonia. The author and editor of the publication, well known architect Georgi Konstantinovski, has structured the book such that each individual architect is represented on a double page spread, no matter their hierarchy or status, illustrating a socialist form of equality in representation.

In the period between 1954 and 1962, after a brief period in the office of Drago Galić in Zagreb, Nestorova-Tomić pursued a series of study-related practical training in France (1957) and Britain (1960 funded by British Council), and in 1964 with her husband, Lyubomir Tomić, to the USA (New York, Berkeley, and Chicago).

During this time Nestorova-Tomić worked with her husband on the design of the apartment block in Albert Einstein Street, in Skopje.

== Collaboration ==
In 1964 Nestorova-Tomić joined the Institute of Urbanism and Architecture in Skopje where in a team with architectural conservationists, consultants, and engineers, she worked on the project for the reconstruction and restoration of the Stara Charshija (Old Bazaar), a large area of Ottoman urban morphology, including significant Ottoman architectural edifices, mosques and hamams, on the north side of the Vardar river at the foothills of the Kale Fortress, in Skopje. This was a key component of the reconstruction of Skopje. It was followed by the project on the restoration of the historical Ottoman structure of Sulei Inn. With the team of the architect, Arsovski, Nestorova-Tomić worked on the department store, ‘Skopjanka’ in Skopje.

One highlight of her career is the design for the Museum of Macedonia (1972, Skopje) for which she collaborated with the architect, Muratovski. Due to its innovative setting on the site within the context of the Stara Charishija, the museum project has been noted in a few publications including, Tokarev’s book, 100 Years of Modern Architecture, Volume 3: Contributions of Macedonia and Yugoslavia (1918-1990) and Kulić’s 2011 book on Yugoslavian architecture, Modernism In-Between.

== Family ==
Nestorova-Tomić's daughter is the artist Diana Tomić.

== Death ==
Nestorova-Tomić died on 22 May 2024, aged 94.

== Awards ==
In 2011, Nestorova-Tomić was the recipient of the Andreja Damjanov award, which is given to individuals who have made significant contribution over a sustained period.

Nestorova-Tomić was a model architectural figure in North Macedonia. In the first volume of Konstantinovski’s encyclopaedic publication, one of the very few publications on Macedonian architects, Mimoza Nestorova-Tomić is one of 39 female architects out of 276 architects represented. Along with a few other women, Nestorova-Tomić played a significant role in the production of Macedonian architectural modernity.
