= Lake Ohrid =

International lake in North Macedonia and Albania

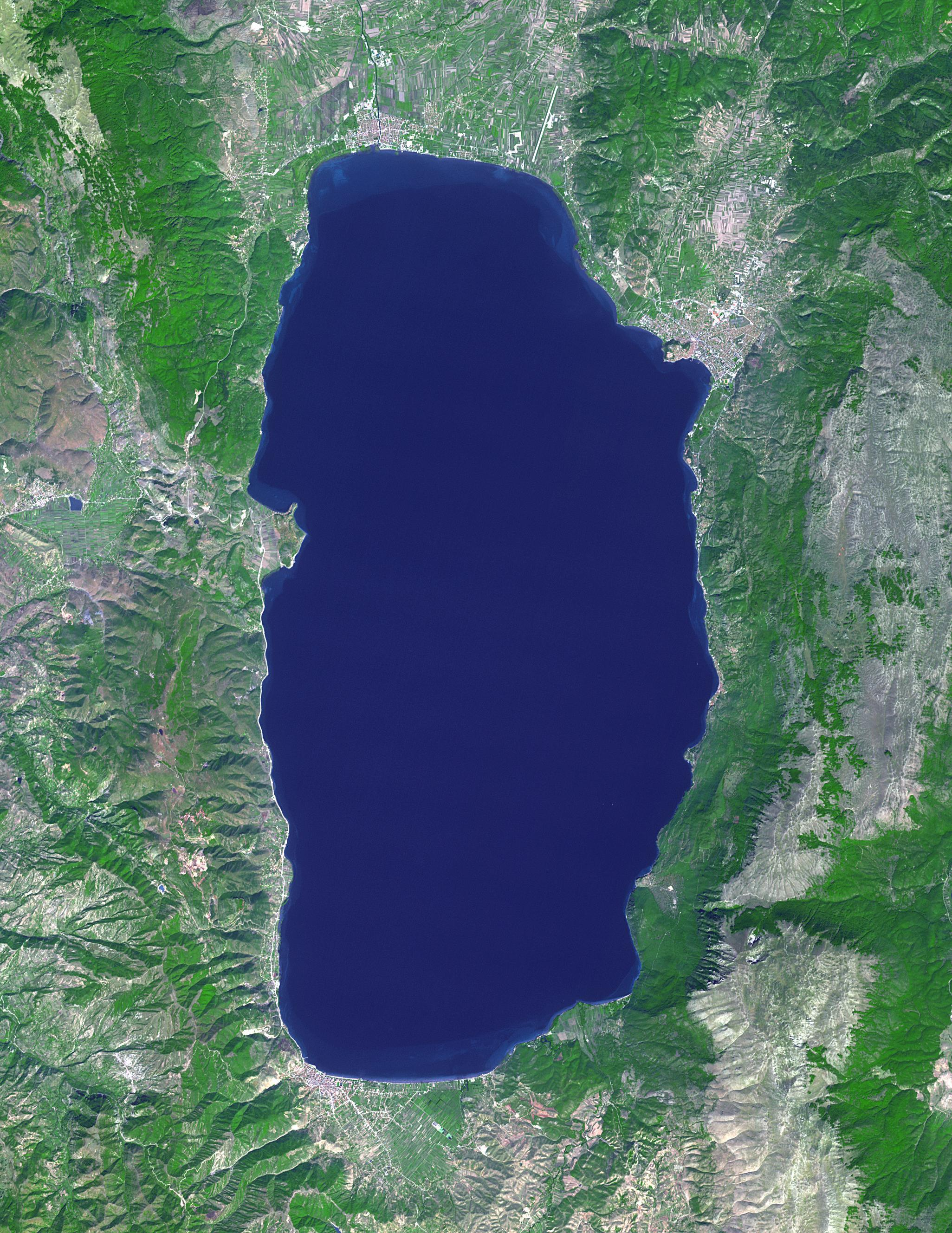
- Lake Ohrid viewed from a NASA satellite

- Location within North Macedonia Location within Albania Location within Balkans Location within Europe

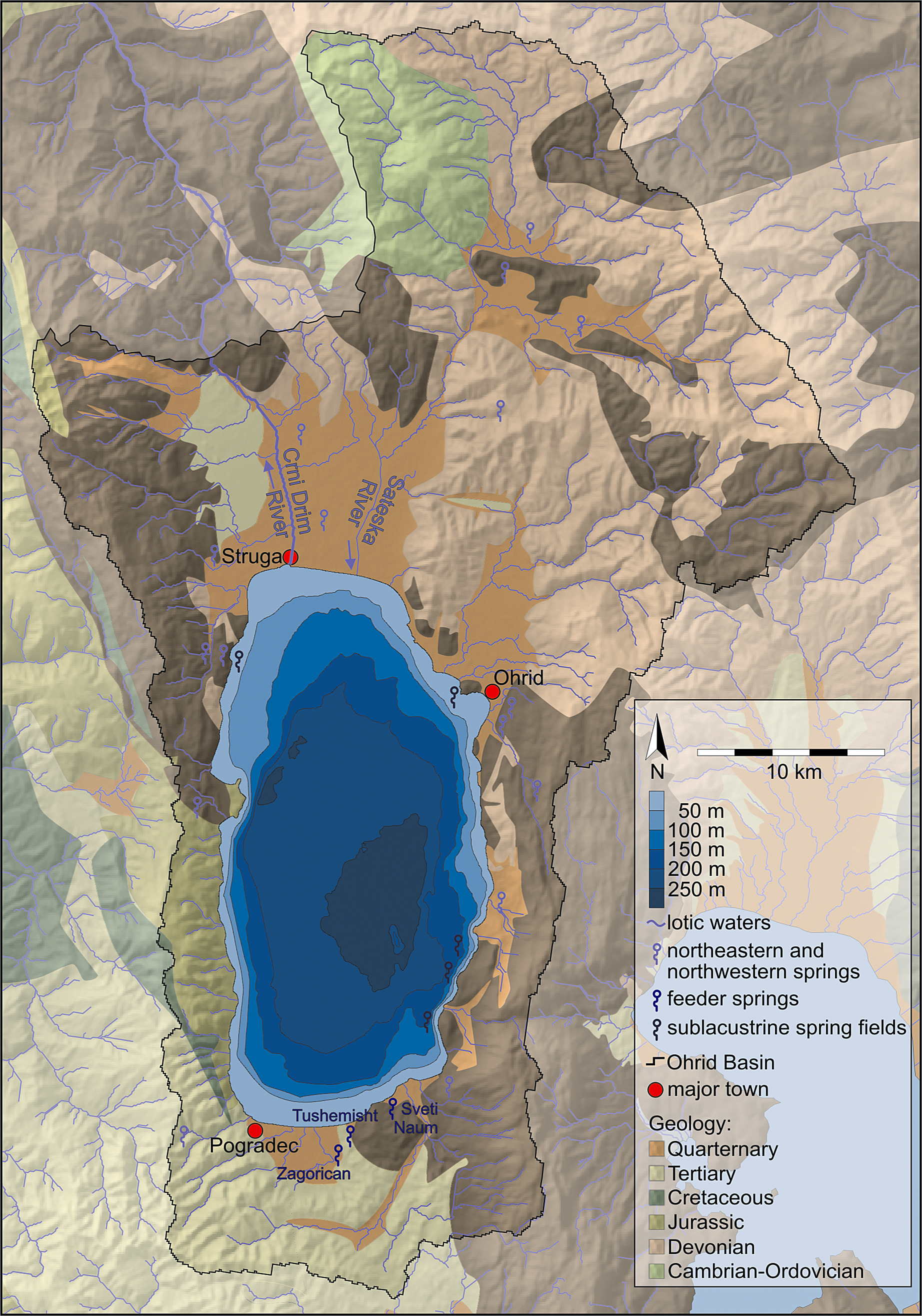
- Map of the Ohrid Basin showing major hydrological and geological features
- Location: North Macedonia–Albania border
- Coordinates: 41°02′N 20°43′E
- Lake type: ancient lake, tectonic lake
- Primary inflows: Sateska River, Biljana's springs, underground link with Lake Prespa
- Primary outflows: Black Drin River
- Catchment area: 2,600 km^{2} (1,000 sq mi)
- Basin countries: North Macedonia, Albania
- Max. length: 36.4 km (22.6 mi)
- Max. width: 16.8 km (10.4 mi)
- Surface area: 358 km^{2} (138 sq mi)
- Average depth: 155 m (509 ft)
- Max. depth: 288 m (945 ft)
- Water volume: 55.49 km^{3} (13.31 cu mi)
- Residence time: 70 years
- Shore length^{1}: 87.53 km (54.39 mi); North Macedonia: 56.02 km (34.81 mi); Albania: 31.51 km (19.58 mi)
- Surface elevation: 693 m (2,274 ft)
- Islands: none
- Settlements: Ohrid, Struga (North Macedonia); Pogradec (Albania)

UNESCO World Heritage Site
- Official name: Natural and Cultural Heritage of the Ohrid region
- Type: Natural, Cultural
- Criteria: i, iii, iv, vii
- Designated: 1979 (3rd session)
- Reference no.: 99
- Region: Europe and North America
- Extensions: 1980, 2019

Ramsar Wetland
- Designated: 15 February 2021
- Reference no.: 2449
- ^{1} Shore length is not a well-defined measure.

Lake Ohrid (Note: Macedonian: Охридско Езеро, romanized: Ohridsko Ezero; Macedonian pronunciation: [ˈɔxritskɔ ˈɛzɛrɔ]; Albanian: Liqeni i Ohrit; Albanian pronunciation: [liˈcɛni i ˈɔhrit]) is a lake which straddles the mountainous border between the southwestern part of North Macedonia and eastern Albania. It is one of Europe's deepest and oldest lakes, with a unique aquatic ecosystem of worldwide importance, with more than 200 endemic species.

North Macedonia's side of Lake Ohrid was declared a World Heritage Site by UNESCO in 1979, with the site being extended to also include the cultural and historic area of Ohrid in 1980. In 2010, NASA named one of Titan's lakes after it. In 2014, the Ohrid-Prespa Transboundary Reserve between Albania and North Macedonia was added to UNESCO's World Network of Biosphere Reserves. Albania's side of Lake Ohrid was also designated UNESCO world heritage status in 2019. North Macedonia's portion was designated as a protected Ramsar site in 2021, passing all nine criteria for proclamation.

In Albania, the coastal portion of the lake holds Managed Nature Reserve status. In North Macedonia, a portion of the lakeside is part of the Galičica National Park.

The towns situated at the lakeside are Ohrid and Struga in North Macedonia along with Pogradec in Albania. The lake is otherwise surrounded by settlements in the form of villages and resorts in both basin countries.

== Geography ==
Topographic map with Lake Ohrid on the left

Lake Ohrid is one of the oldest lakes in the world, and with a maximum depth of 288 metres (945 ft) and mean depth of 155 m (509 ft), it is the deepest lake in the Balkans. It covers an area of 358 square kilometres (138 sq mi) and contains an estimated 55.49 cubic kilometres (45 million acre-feet) of water. The lake is 30.4 km (18.9 mi) long and 14.8 km (9.2 mi) wide at its maximum extent, with a shoreline of 87.53 km (54.39 mi).

64% of Lake Ohrid's shoreline and 69% of its surface area are within North Macedonia, whereas 36% of the shoreline and 31% of the surface area fall within Albania.

== Origin ==
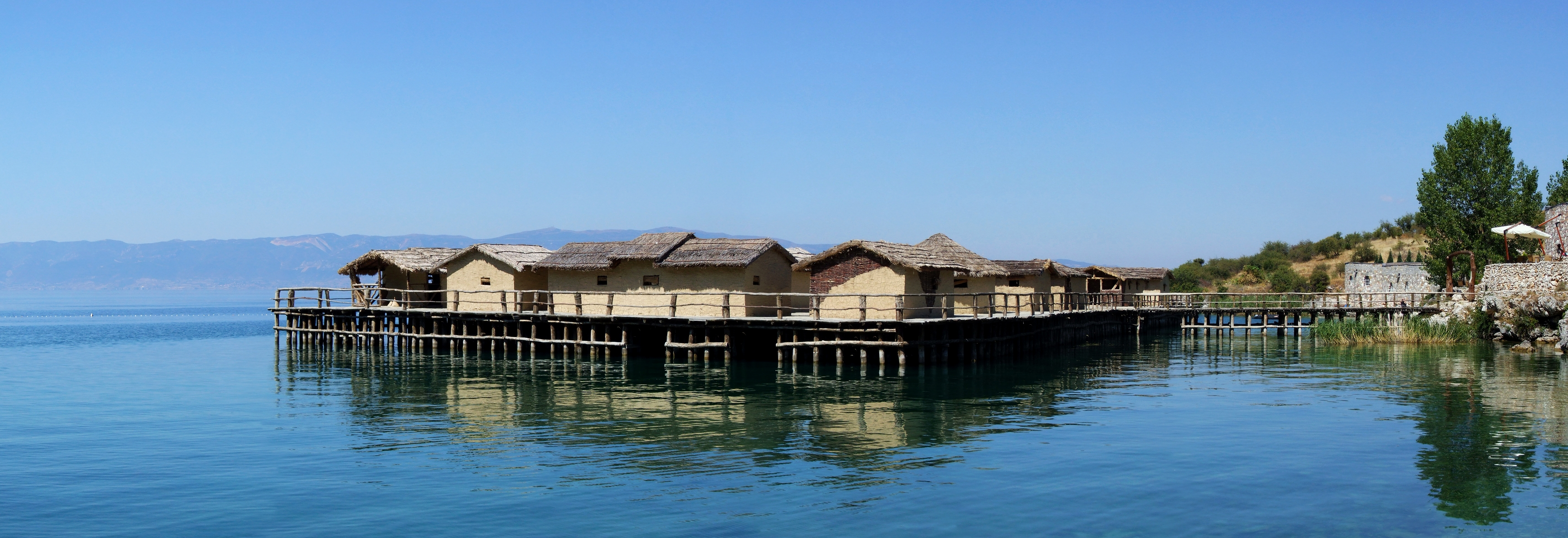
Reconstruction of Bronze Age stilt houses on Lake Ohrid, near Peštani, North Macedonia

The Ohrid and Prespa Lakes are the two largest in a north–south chain of tectonic basins (grabens) including the Korçë basin, and Lake Ioannina in northwestern Greece, known as the Dessaret group. The transition from compressional to extensional tectonics in the central Balkan Mts occurred around 6 million years ago, with the oldest lake sediments being Pliocene, possibly 3-5 million years old. The Dessaret chain is a poorly developed rift valley. Worldwide, rift valley lakes with similarly ancient origins include Lake Baikal, Lake Titicaca, Lake Tanganyika and the Dead Sea. Most lakes have much shorter life spans as they rapidly fill with sediments. Lake Ohrid is being infilled at its north end by its modest main tributaries, but is preserved by its great depth, by continuing tectonic subsidence, and by the main inflows being from underground karstic channels from Lake Prespa carrying minimal sediment. The graben system is still tectonically active and Lake Ohrid sits in a seismogenic landscape, with many visible traces including fresh fault scarps, displaced sediment and soil sequences, stepped hillsides, and a hydrothermal field near Kosel. Moderate earthquakes are frequent, with the strongest yet measured here on 18 February 1911, with a magnitude 6.6 at a focal depth of 15 km, destroying houses but with no loss of life.

== Hydrology ==
The lake drains an area of around 2,600 km² and is fed primarily by underground springs on the eastern shore (about 50% of total inflow), with roughly 25% shares from rivers and direct precipitation. Over 20% of the lake's water comes from nearby Lake Prespa, about 10 km (6.2 mi) to the southeast and at 150 m higher altitude than Lake Ohrid. The water leaves Lake Prespa trickling through underground watercourses in the karstic landscape, where it is joined by mountain range precipitation and eventually emerges in numerous springs along the eastern shore and below the water surface of Lake Ohrid. The water leaves Lake Ohrid by evaporation (~40%) and through its only outlet, the Black Drin River, which flows in a northerly direction into Albania and thus to the Adriatic Sea. The relatively dry, Mediterranean climate and the small drainage basin of 2,600 km² (catchment/lake surface ratio of ~7) of Lake Ohrid results in a long hydraulic residence time scale of ~70 yr.

== Physical and geochemical properties ==
The water at the surface of Lake Ohrid moves predominantly in a counter-clockwise direction along the shore, as a result of wind forcing and the Earth rotation, similar to the Ekman-phenomenon known from oceans. In terms of vertical water exchange, convective mixing during winter cooling is the dominant process. However, in an average winter only the top 150–200 meters of the lake are mixed, whereas the water below is stably stratified by salinity. The stability due to this salinity gradient allows complete convective mixing events only roughly once every 7 years.

Both in terms of nutrient concentration (4.5 μg L^{−1} of phosphorus), as well as biological parameters Lake Ohrid qualifies as oligotrophic. Thanks to this oligotrophy and the filtered spring inflows, the water is exceptionally clear with transparencies to a depth of as much as 22 meters (66 feet). Lake Ohrid lacks an annual deep water exchange which in other lakes can bring complete overturn; plunging rivers are also absent. Despite this, dissolved oxygen never drops below ~6 mg L^{−1}.

== Wetland habitats ==
Previously extensive wetland habitats in the vicinity of Lake Ohrid have been lost due to conversion into agricultural or urban land. These include Struga Marsh, large portions of which were drained for agriculture in the 1940s and again in the 1960s when the River Sateska was rerouted.

Nowadays, the last remaining significant coastline wetland at Lake Ohrid is Studenchishte Marsh, which is located on the eastern shore near the city of Ohrid. Despite degradation from a variety of sources such as large-scale disposal of construction waste, major land conversion, disruption of water connections to Lake Ohrid, beach urbanization and loss of reed belts, Studenchishte Marsh is still an important buffer to prevent lake eutrophication and a key habitat for biodiversity, including relict plants and endemic species. These values, and the comparative rareness of similar habitats in Macedonia (now North Macedonia), prompted an expert team in 2012 to recommend designation of a 63.97-hectare area at Studenchishte Marsh to be protected as a Natural Monument under Macedonian law.

Changes to the General Urban Plan for Ohrid 2014–2020, however, made provisions for Studenchishte Marsh to be drained and replaced with infrastructure for tourism and water-sports, a proposal which, together with other regional developments, was opposed by numerous local and international experts, including the Society of Wetland Scientists. A Strategic Environmental Assessment also concluded that no measure except non-implementation could reduce the direct negative impact on Studenchishte and the indirect negative impact on Lake Ohrid if the proposed construction was to take place at the wetland. Plans to drain the area have subsequently been reversed and the Macedonian government announced in 2018 that it would move forward with proclamation of Studenchishte Marsh as a protected area and its designation together with Lake Ohrid as a Wetland of International Importance under the Ramsar Convention. Ramsar status was formalized in 2021 although protection of Studenchishte Marsh at the national level has not yet been completed.

The IUCN identifies wetland rehabilitation as one of five potential site needs for the UNESCO Natural and Cultural Heritage of the Ohrid Region. However, the potential to restore Struga Marsh, which was not included in the boundaries of the Ramsar Site, is likely to be reduced by construction of the European Corridor VIII railway, while Studenchishte's future is yet to be fully resolved.

== Fauna ==
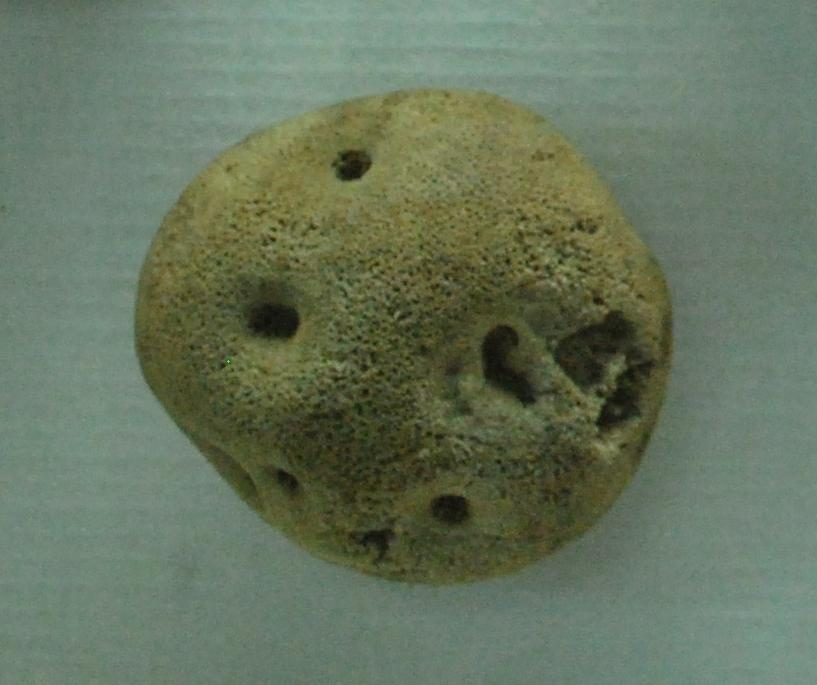
Ohrid sponge (Ochridaspongia rotunda) is endemic to Lake Ohrid

Measured by its surface area of 358 km², Ohrid is probably among the most biodiverse lakes on Earth. While it is special as such, by far the most spectacular quality is its impressive endemism. Similar to Lake Baikal or Lake Tanganyika, Lake Ohrid harbors endemic species covering the whole food-chain, from phytoplankton and sessile algae (20 species; e.g., Cyclotella fottii), over plant species (2 species; e.g., Chara ohridana), zooplankton (5 species; e.g., Cyclops ochridanus), cyprinid fish (8 species; e.g., Pachychilon pictum), to predatory fish (two trout species; the Ohrid trout complex Salmo letnica, and "Belvica" Salmo ohridanus) and finally its diverse endemic bottom fauna (176 species; e.g. Ochridagammarus solidus), with particularly large endemism among crustaceans, molluscs, sponges and planarians. There were recorded 68 species of freshwater snails from the Lake Ohrid basin. 73.5% (50 species) of the total freshwater gastropod fauna appear to be endemic to the Lake Ohrid basin. Whereas the endemic species list cited above is based on morphological and ecological characteristics, some recent applications of molecular genetic techniques underline the difference of the fauna from common European taxa, as well as the old age of the lake.

Quite remarkably, exotic species do not seem to be a major issue in Lake Ohrid, although they have been recorded in small populations for several decades or exist in nearby rivers or lakes. The reason lies very probably in the ideal adaptation of the endemic species to the specific conditions in the lake, such as low nutrient availability, good living conditions in greater depth thanks to high water transparency and oxygen content, as well as subaquatic spring inflows supplying cool and oxygen-rich water. In total, seven introduced fish species are known from the lake.

Despite the exceptionally high level of endemism in Lake Ohrid (for example, a third of the 21 native fish species and almost 80% of its 72 mollusc species are endemic), a significant number of non-endemic species are found in Lake Ohrid. This includes species, which are mobile (e.g., via water birds) or migratory, such as the European eel.

=== Birds ===
The lakeshore reed beds and wetlands provide critical habitat for hundreds of thousands of wintering water birds, including rare and threatened species such as the Dalmatian pelican, ferruginous duck, swan, spotted eagle, and eastern imperial eagle. The Macedonian part of the lake has been designated an Important Bird Area (IBA) by BirdLife International because it supports populations of common coots and pygmy cormorants (Microcarbo pygmaeus). The Albanian part of the lake has been designated a separate but corresponding IBA for the same reason, with additional bird species being common goldeneyes, red-crested pochards (Netta rufina) and black-necked grebes. Wetland of International Importance status under the Ramsar Convention is underpinned in part by the biogeographically significant populations of red-crested pochard and pygmy cormorants too, but also goosander (Mergus merganser).

== Socio-economy ==
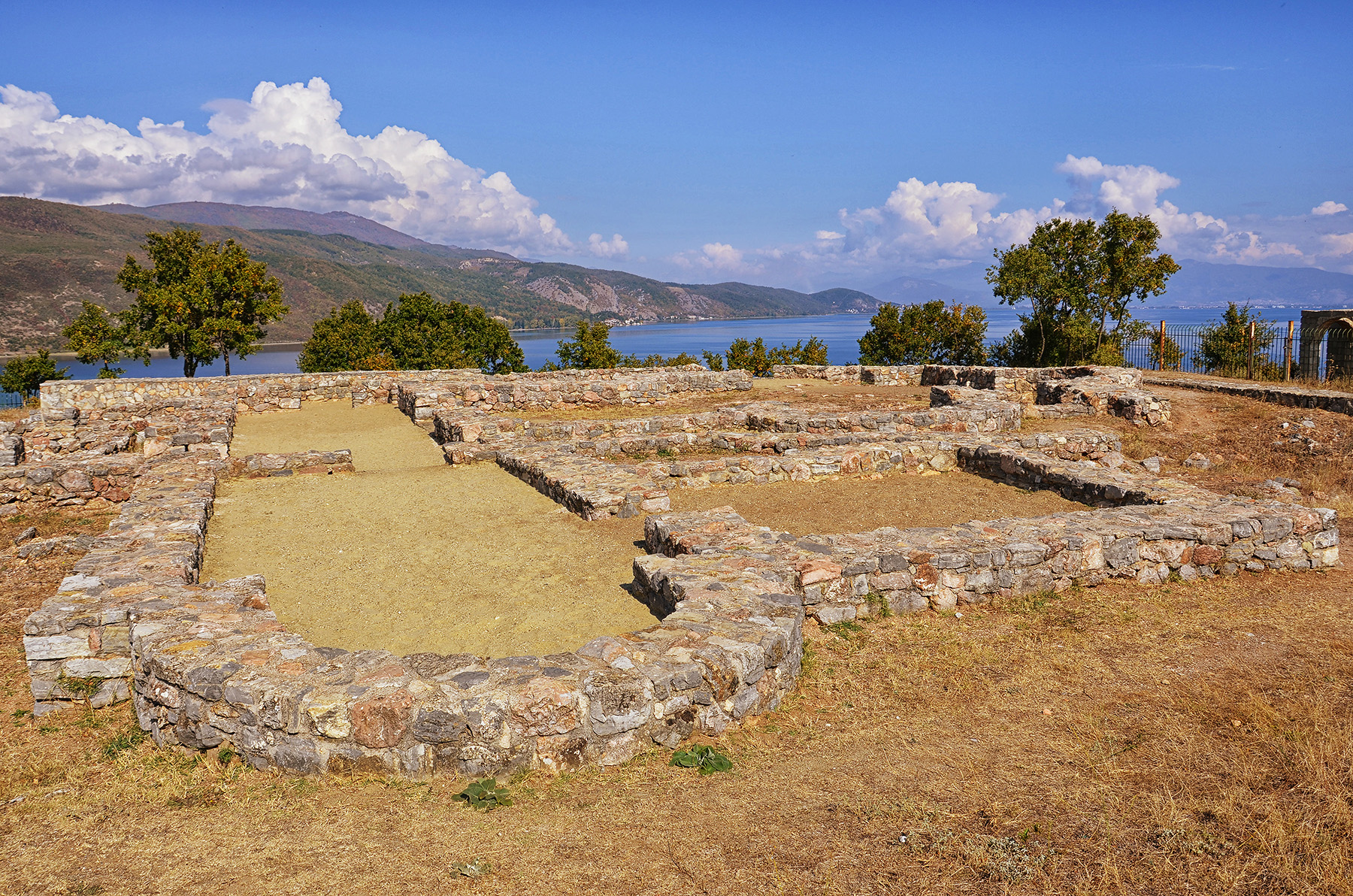
The 6th-century paleochristian basilica overlooking the Ohrid Lake in Lin, Albania.

The prehistoric pile-dwelling near Lin in Pogradec, Albania, is Europe's oldest of its kind, as confirmed by University of Bern specialists. Archaeologists from Albania and Switzerland have been excavating remains on the Ohrid Lake shore and underwater. This settlement, over 8,500 years old, developed agriculture 8,000–9,000 years ago, playing a key role in spreading farming practices across Europe. The Lin site predates similar Swiss sites by over 2,000 years.

There are three cities on the lake's shores: Ohrid and Struga on the Macedonian side; and Pogradec in Albania. There are also several fishing villages, although tourism is now a more significant part of their income. The catchment area of the lake has a population of around 170,000 people, with 131,000 people living directly at the lake shore (43,000 in Albania and 88,000 in North Macedonia). The population in the catchment has increased by 100,000 people in the last half century, putting the lake's fragile ecosystem under pressure.

The historic monuments, as well as the pristine lake environment, make the area around Lake Ohrid a prime site for tourism. In the 1980s, more than 200,000 national and international tourists went on a pilgrimage to the Macedonian lake side every year. During the Yugoslav crisis and particularly after the interethnic conflicts within North Macedonia in 2001, international tourism collapsed but has been slowly recovering. Even though many visitors are staying for a weekend only, tourism makes an important contribution to the local economy (~1 visitor/inhabitant).

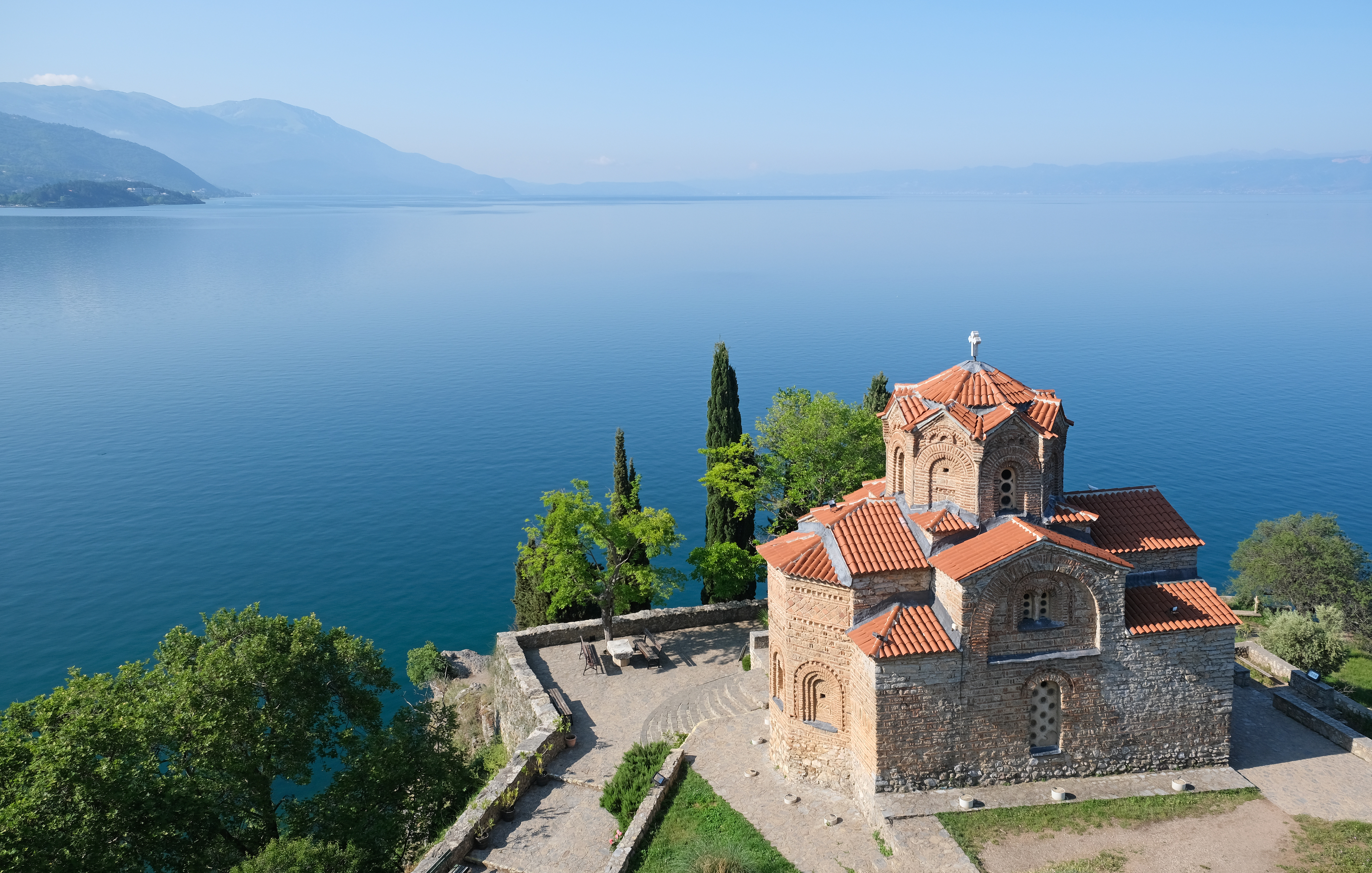
Church of St. John Kaneo and the Ohrid Lake

Historically, Lake Ohrid was close to a main highway of the Roman Empire, the Via Egnatia, from Durrës on the coast of Albania to Thessalonika and Constantinople (Istanbul), but now is a communications backwater. There is a minor road around the lake, with border crossings between Albania and North Macedonia. Religious monuments such as the Black Madonna south west of Struga and St Naum monastery are counterposed with ravages of war, such as the fortifications of the Macedonian Front across Galicica Mountain.

== World Heritage Site ==
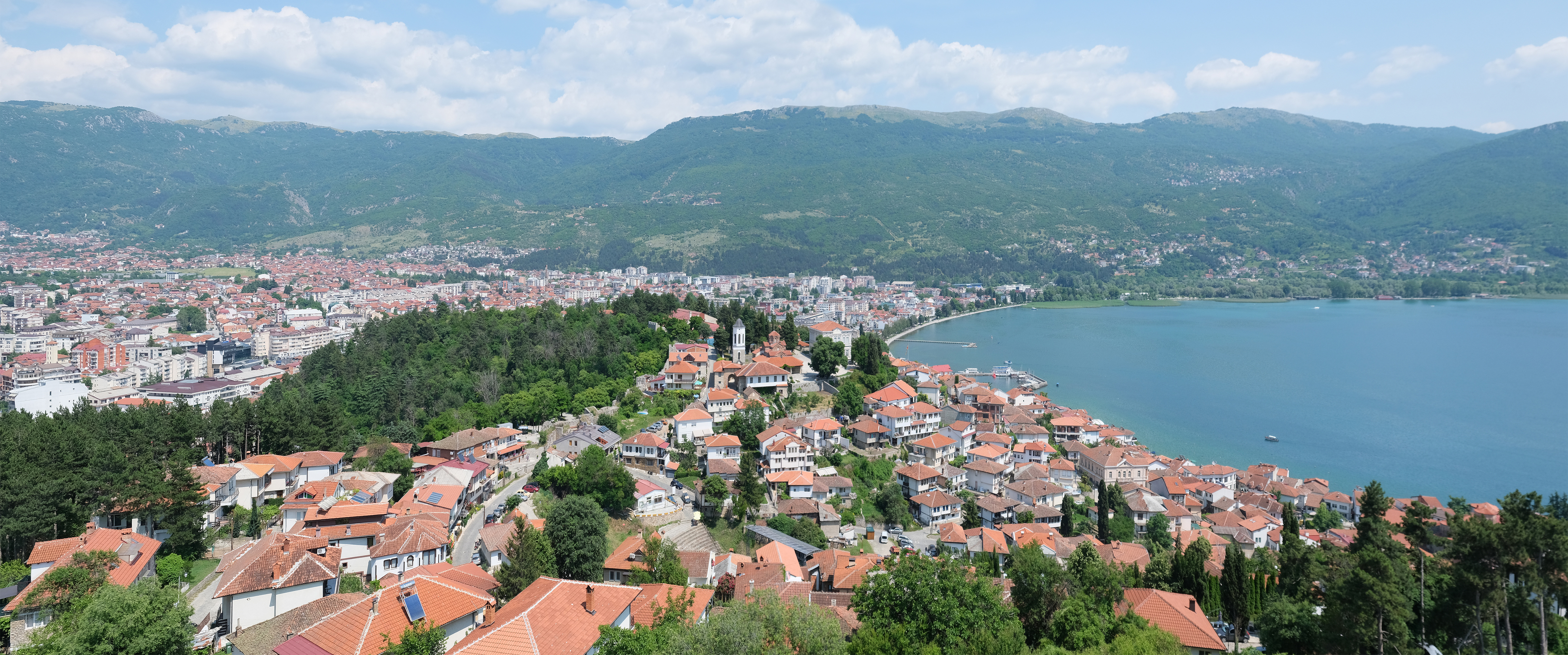
View of Ohrid and Ohrid Lake from Samuil's Fortress

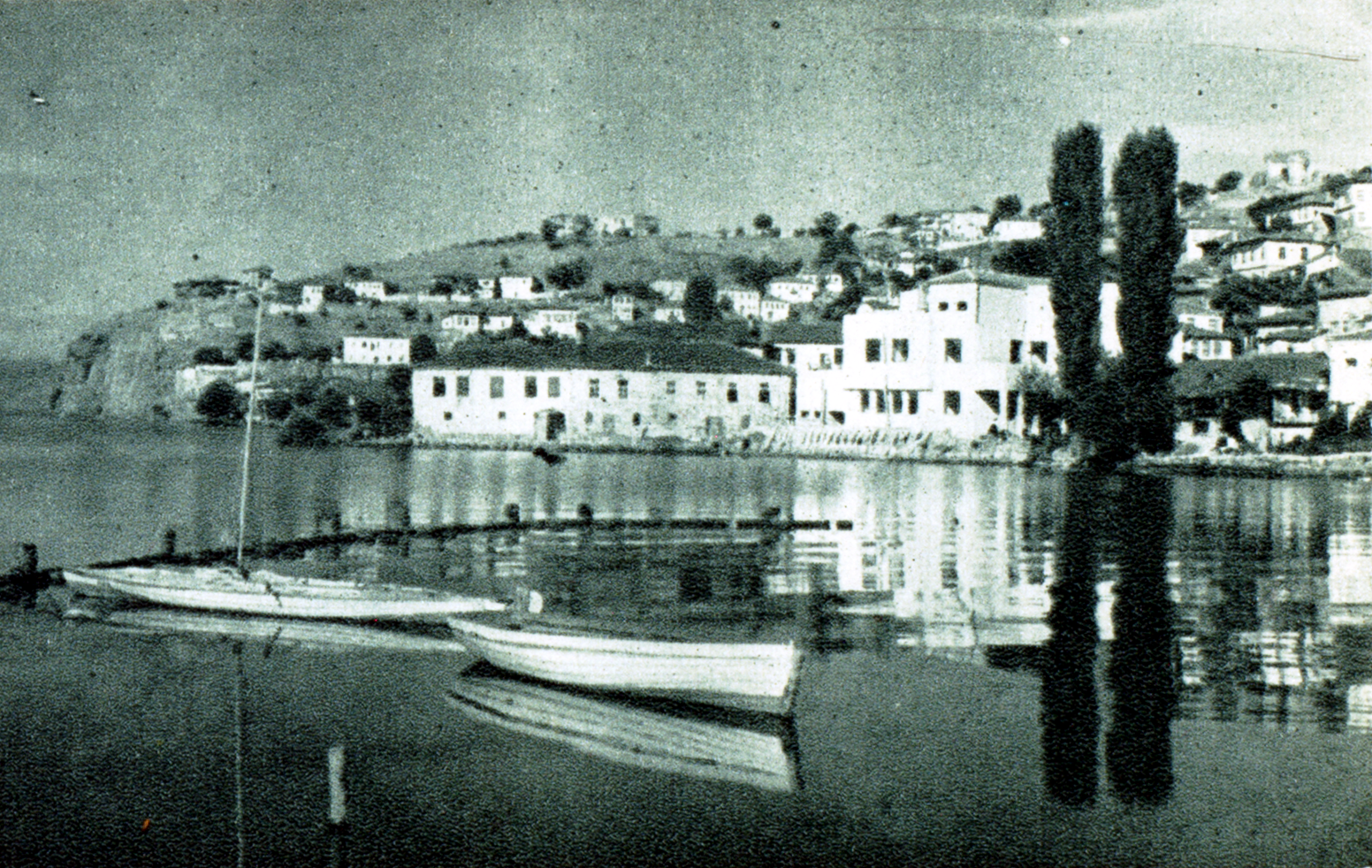
View of old Ohrid

The Macedonian side of Lake Ohrid was declared a World Heritage Site by UNESCO at the 3rd Session of the World Heritage Committee in 1979 and holds that status under Criterion VII as a superlative natural phenomenon related to its refuge function for relict and world-unique freshwater species, and its rich bird life. The lake became part of a mixed Natural and Cultural World Heritage Site in 1980 when the city of Ohrid in Macedonia was also designated with UNESCO status for its architectural, artistic and religious values.

Concern over current and potential deterioration of the World Heritage Site prompted invitation of a joint Reactive Monitoring Mission by the World Heritage Centre, IUCN and ICOMOS in April 2017, which identified a wide range of pressures including from transport infrastructure, traffic, tourism developments, overfishing, sewerage, solid waste disposal, invasive species, both legal and illegal construction, and management of water levels. The mission report devised 19 recommendations for Macedonia, which were incorporated under Decision 41 COM 7B.34 of the World Heritage Committee at its 41st Session in Krakow, Poland in 2017.

In May 2019, the UNESCO World Heritage Centre expanded the World Heritage Site to the Albanian side of the lake. In addition, draft Decision 43 COM 7B.36 was released recommending for the Ohrid region, including Lake Ohrid, to be placed on the List of World Heritage in Danger during the 43rd Session of the World Heritage Committee in Baku, Azerbaijan. This position aligns with IUCN advice. In its analysis and conclusions, the World Heritage Centre observed threats to Lake Ohrid from "decreased water levels, uncontrolled discharge, water pollution due to inadequate wastewater treatment systems leading to evident eutrophication at the mouths of intake rivers, heavy pressures from tourism, and extensive uncontrolled urban development and inappropriate exploitation of the coastal zones." It also observed that the majority of recommendations from the 2017 Reactive Monitoring Mission had not been implemented.

== Science and research ==
Due to its size, accessibility and high species diversity, Lake Ohrid has been used as natural laboratory for geological, ecological, and evolutionary research. Deep sediment cores augmented by diverse ecology in the present day offer an extensive archive from which to understand the history of its region over the past 1,200,000 years.

Research to date has investigated biodiversity processes, the interplay between geological and biological evolution, the birth of European agriculture, and investigations of regional climate and environmental conditions over hundreds of thousands of years.

Among other contributions, such research has delivered the first empirical evidence for niche-based assembly processes from a natural system and demonstrated the establishment of dynamic equilibrium in an isolated ecosystem during the slowdown of both speciation and extinction rates. It has also demonstrated the importance of tree cover for buffering soil erosion during times of climate change and provided insight into the composition of regional flora through glacial and inter-glacial periods.

== Human influence ==
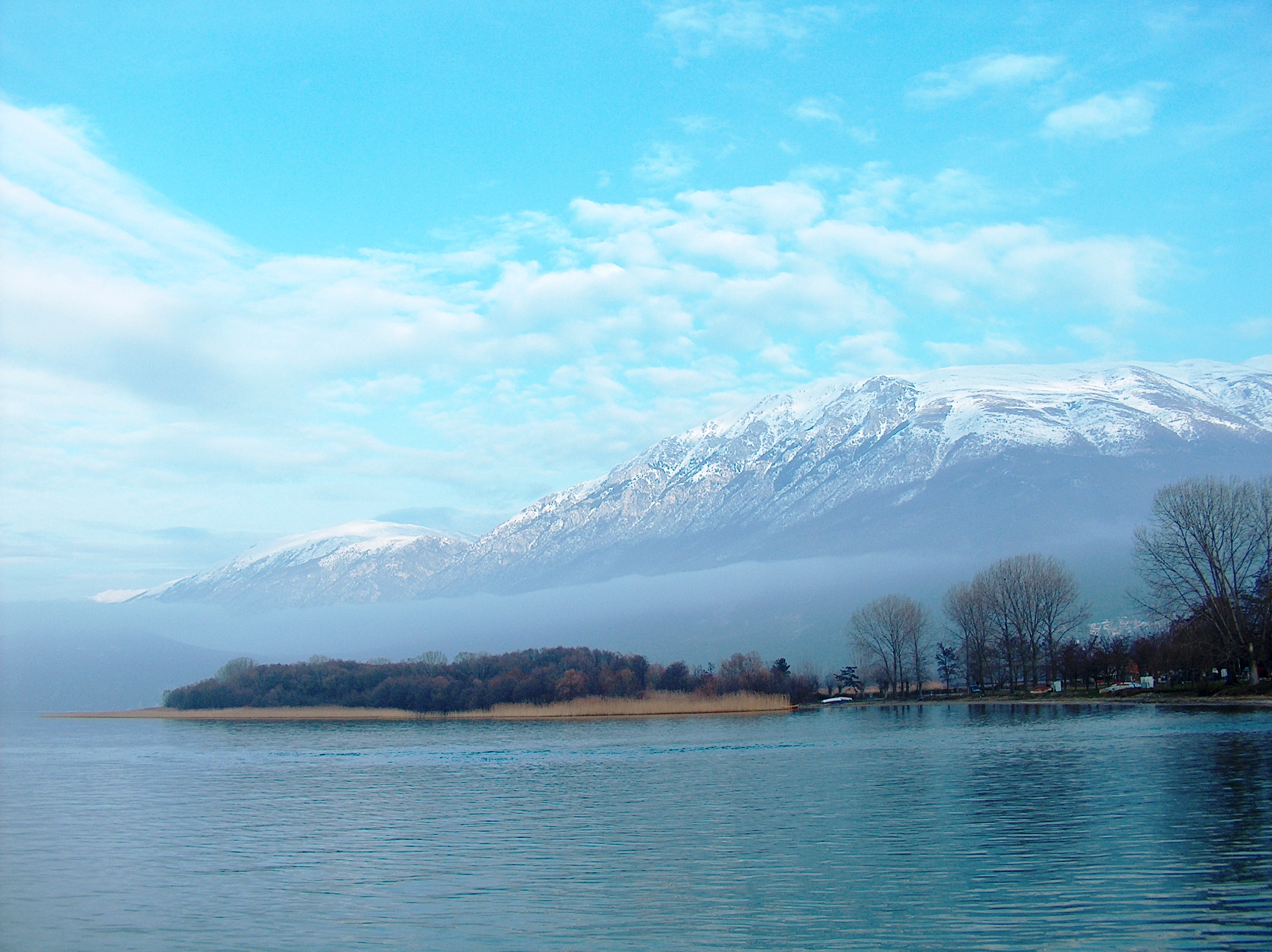
The lake coast at St. Naum Monastery, with Galičica Mountain in the background.

Shore habitats are under particular pressure from human activities. Particular threats are the building of tourist facilities directly at the shore, destroying of reed belts to gain agricultural land and intense pollution close to the mouth of tributaries. Although the effects of these human impacts have not been evaluated in detail they are of great concern, as the shallow water sites are particularly rich in endemic bottom fauna and form important spawning grounds for several endemic fish species. Moreover, reed belts have great importance for water birds.

Commercial fish yield, i.e. the two endemic trout species, has dropped significantly over the past decades, both in North Macedonia and in Albania. The most probable reason is overfishing and possibly destruction of spawning grounds. Pollution may also be a factor. Although there are regulations regarding fishing practice (e.g. minimal mesh size) and only a limited number of licensed fishermen, these rules are always not obeyed as a result of the high market value of the endemic trout. As a reaction to the situation, a seven-year moratorium on fishing Ohrid trout was imposed from 2004 to help the population recover and to allow scientists to collect further data. Nonetheless, even though thorough assessment of fish stocks has not been conducted since the 1990s and trout populations are still believed to be in decline, fishing with quotas was restarted in 2012 under the auspices of a concessionaire. More data is required to determine whether these current fishing levels are sustainable and illegal fishing, particularly on the Albanian side of the lake, remains a problem.

While most of the endemic fish species are non-migratory, the European eel spawns in the distant Sargasso Sea while its offspring return to the lake. Unfortunately, as in many European lakes, it is very unlikely today that eels can reach Lake Ohrid naturally and return to the Sargasso Sea, as a result of several hydropower dams on the Black Drin and the Drin River, both in North Macedonia and Albania. As a result, eel found in Lake Ohrid are stocked populations.

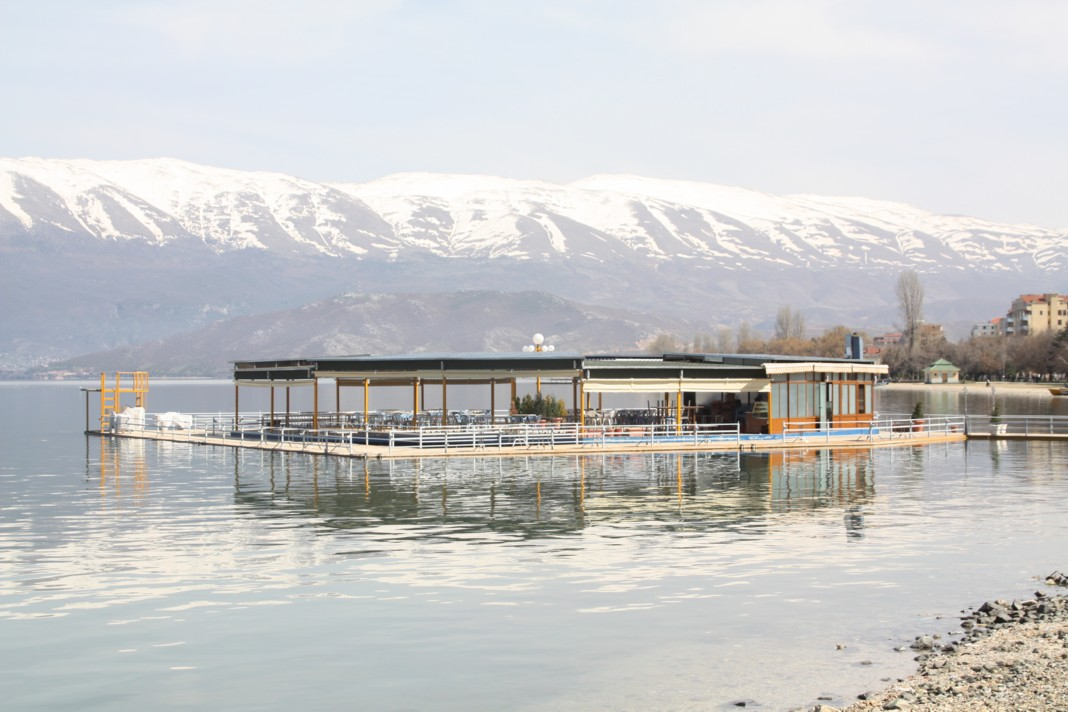
Pogradec along Lake Ohrid

Given the population growth over the past 50 years, a particular concern is the potential eutrophication of currently oligotrophic Lake Ohrid from increased pollution. Indeed, sediment cores show a ~3.5 fold increase in phosphorus concentration over the past century. On the one hand, shifts from endemic to common European species, which are better adapted to higher nutrient conditions, have already been observed close to polluted inflows. On the other hand, higher nutrient levels have reduced the water transparency, as well as the oxygen availability in the deep water and at the lake bottom, two properties which are requisite for the endemic flora and fauna. Still, the lake is in a comparably good state at the moment. However it may take more than a decade to see the effects of today's pollution level in the lake, because of its long water residence time. Moreover, it was shown that the negative effects from eutrophication would be significantly amplified by global warming. Although there is time to react, computer simulations indicate that at least a 50% reduction in phosphorus input must be reached to keep the deep water oxygenated for the next 50 years at predicted atmospheric warming. This aim could be reached by controlling household wastewater, which is by far the biggest phosphorus source at the moment. First steps in that direction have been taken by extending and improving the existing sewage system in North Macedonia in the framework of a GEF (Global Environment Facility) program. The most important next task would be a solution for three remaining, severely polluted tributaries, one in North Macedonia and two in Albania.

== Declaration on the Protection of the Lake Ohrid Ecosystem ==
On 3 May 2018, the Society of Wetland Scientists released the Declaration on the Protection of the Lake Ohrid Ecosystem, which was passed unanimously by 45 attending members at its 13th annual European meeting. Urging Macedonian authorities to substantially enhance protection of Lake Ohrid, the declaration outlines the unique significance of the interconnected Ohrid-Prespa lake system, both for its biodiversity and relevance to research on climate and evolution, and recommends measures for future management including revitalization and enlargement of wetland areas, pollution control and a re-orientation of tourism policy. It further describes the "critical importance" of the last intact marsh on the Lake Ohrid shore, Studenchishte Marsh, in terms of its species composition and ecosystem services such as water quality improvement, carbon storage and flood retention among others.

== Namesakes ==
Lake Ohrid is also the namesake of Ohrid Lacus, a hydrocarbon lake on the Saturnian moon Titan. It is composed of liquid methane and ethane and is located 71.8°N 221.9°W on Titan's globe.

== See also ==
- Tourism in North Macedonia
- Tourism in Albania
- River Sateska
- Studenčište Marsh
- List of international lakes
