= Struga =

Struga Струга (Macedonian) Strugë/Struga (Albanian)
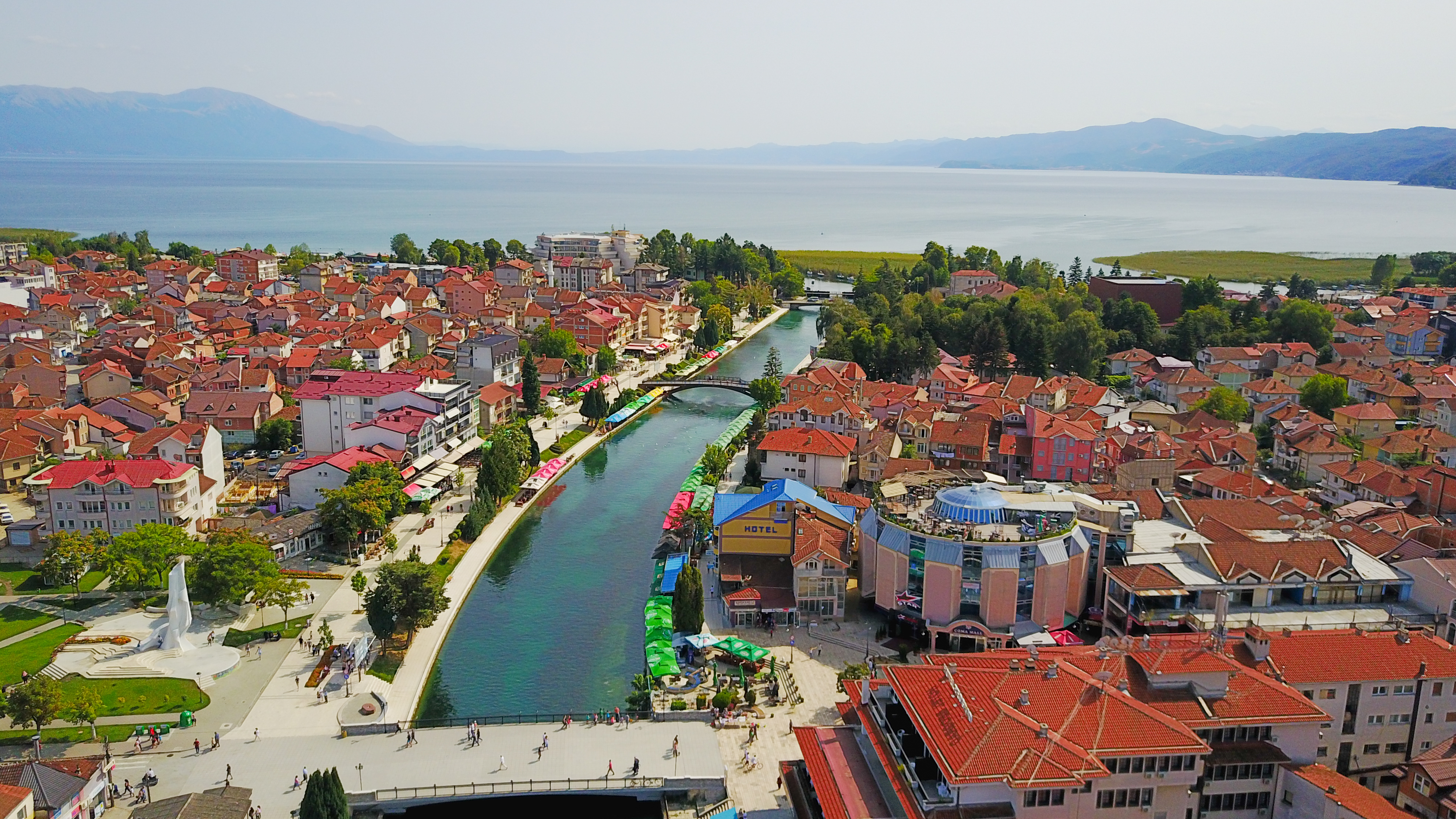
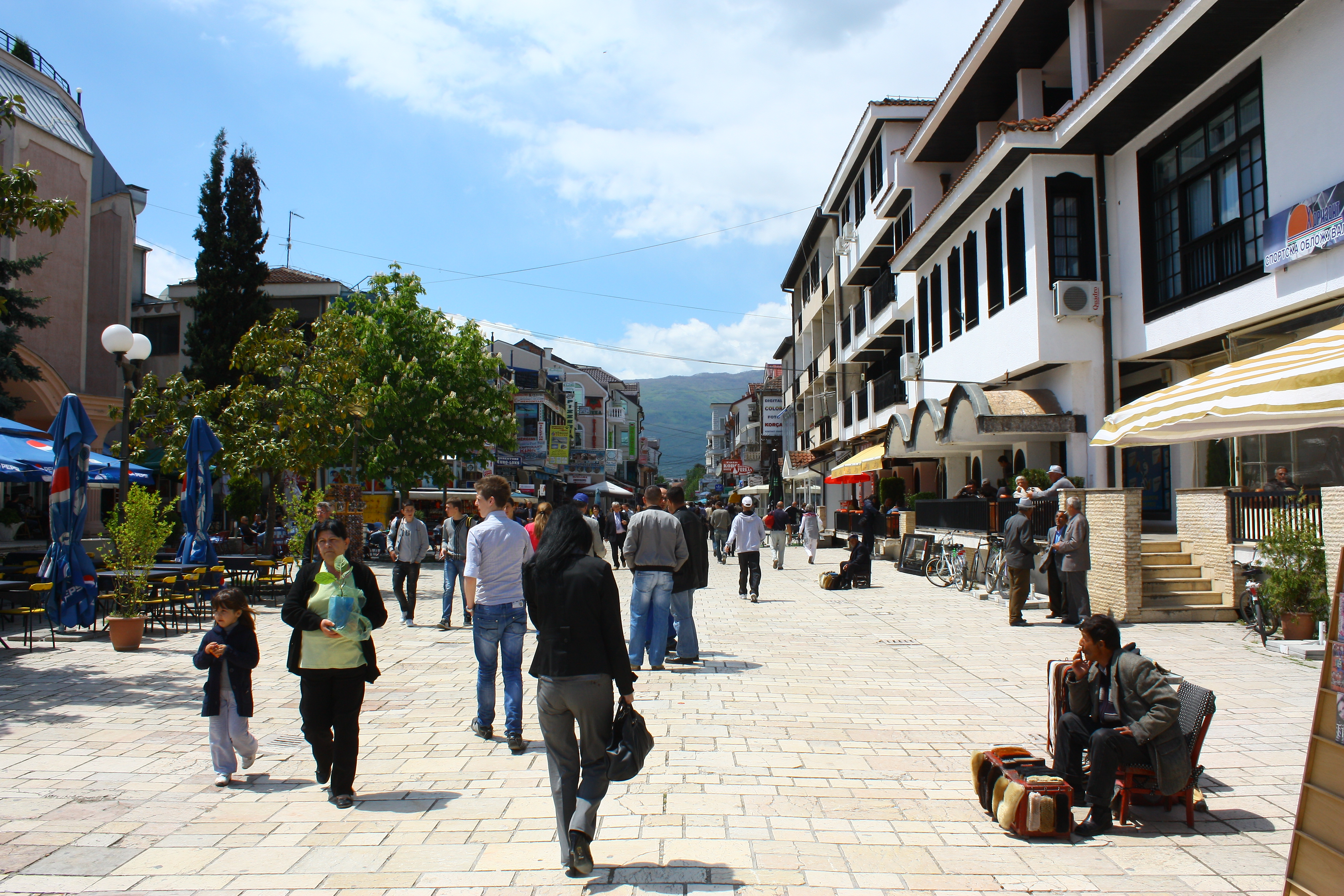
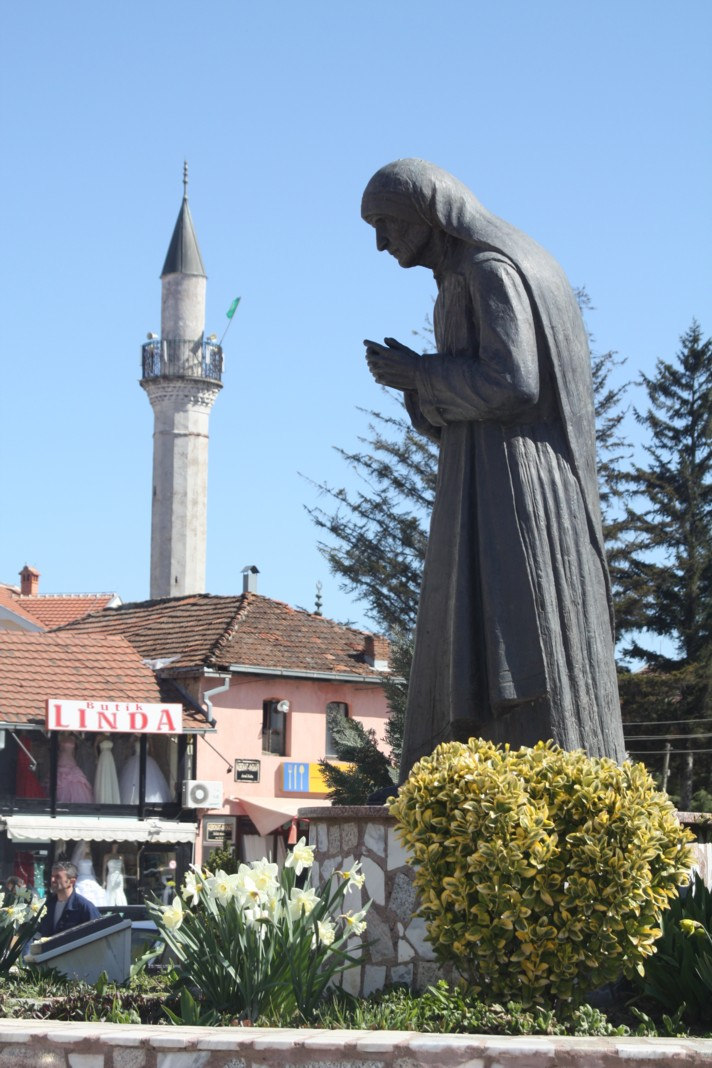
- From the top, Aerial view of Struga, High street, Mother Teresa monument with the Mustafa Çelebi Mosque Minaret in the background

- Flag Coat of arms

- Location within North Macedonia
- Coordinates: 41°10′N 20°40′E
- Country: North Macedonia
- Region: Southwestern
- Municipality: Struga

Government
  - Mayor: Mendi Qyra (Independent)
- Elevation: 693 m (2,274 ft)

Population (2021)
  - Total: 50,980
- Settlement population (15,009)
- Time zone: UTC+1 (CET)
  - Summer (DST): UTC+2 (CEST)
- Postal code: 6330
- Area code: +389 46
- Vehicle registration: SU
- Climate: Cfb
- Website: www.struga.gov.mk

Struga (Macedonian: Струга [ˈstruɡa]; Albanian: Strugë, Albanian definite form: Struga) is a town and popular tourist destination situated in the south-western region of North Macedonia, lying on the shore of Lake Ohrid. The town of Struga is the seat of Struga Municipality. It was traditionally a fishing town.

== Name ==
The toponym Struga is Slavic, meaning generally "riverbed", and is specifically used for excavated ponds or lakes for fishing.

== Geography ==
Struga lies in the Ohrid–Struga basin and anthropogeographical region, part of the Dinaric–Pindus mountain system. The basin is flanked by mountain heights. The region is part of the Crni Drim river area, as opposed to 90% of the rest of North Macedonia which lies in the Vardar river area. The region borders with Albania in the west; Prespa, Demir-Hisar, Kičevo basin and Debar Drimkol to the northeast and east.

Struga is situated on the northern shore of Lake Ohrid, in the south-western part of North Macedonia. The Black Drin river flows out of the lake at Struga and divides the town into two parts. The town lies in an open valley and is part of the Southwestern Statistical Region.

== History ==
Struga is first mentioned in the early 11th century as a village, in Byzantine sources. The name was recorded as Strougi in Greek, in an icon painted in 1267 by Ioannis and dedicated to St. George. The Serbian emperor Stefan Dušan (r. 1331–1355) confirmed some villages in the Ohrid–Struga basin to the Peribleptos Church in 1342–45, and this is the oldest mention of present-day villages in the Ohrid–Struga basin. Dušan donated Struga Vraniška and Struga Mala to the church. The mention of two Struga's could mean that the area was perhaps a feudal domain. The local St. Nicholas church was at earliest built in the beginning of the 14th century. In the fourth quarter of the 14th century the Dušan's Code was transcribed in Struga; the manuscript is today held in Moscow. The region fell under Ottoman rule with the death of Serbian king Marko Mrnjavčević in 1394. During the Ottoman period in the 16th century, a bridge over the Crni Drim was redirected from Vraništa to Struga. With the building of the bridge here, Struga became the main transport centre in the western Ohrid–Struga basin and became a town of handcraft, cattle trade, fish and agricultural equipment. It is mentioned in 1590 in a Cyrillic manuscript, together with its church dedicated to St. George.

Venetian ambassador Lorenzo Bernardo visited the town in 1591, and described it as a village with fertile plains and valleys in "Bulgaria" that was an important destination for wheat shipments, with quality local eel and trout, inhabited by Orthodox Christians Slavs. Hajji Khalifa (1609–1657) mentioned Ustrurga as a settlement.

The settlement was expanded in the 19th century over to the right side of the Crni Drim, with a mostly Muslim population. The Frenchman François Pouqueville (1770–1838) estimated 3,000 inhabitants, who lived on both sides of the river. A small part of the immigrants in the first half of the 19th century were Aromanians from Moscopole, fleeing persecution by Ali Pasha of Ioannina. In the 19th century, two annual local markets were held for 14 days each, in February and September, with Struga's main export being fish. In the late 19th century Struga was a small town. Struga's mercantile notability ended with Albanian brigandage. In the late 19th and early 20th century, Struga was part of the Manastir Vilayet of the Ottoman Empire.

Struga was visited by Henry Fanshawe Tozer (1829–1916) in his travels in the Ottoman Empire, who spoke highly of the region and the Ohrid Lake which he compared to Italian lakes and to Biblical sites such as the Sea of Galilee, he considered Struga to be a head-quarters of fishery in European Turkey and that the fishery in Struga was property of the Ottoman Sultan who sublet it to locals for a large sum, he spoke highly of the endemic Ohrid trout. According to him the marshes in the region were turned into a habitable region by tzar Samuel of Bulgaria at the time when he made the city of Ohrid Bulgarian capital. He visited a large local Bulgarian school and mentioned the admiration that the Byzantine princess Anna Comnena had for the hundred of channels, embankments and watercourses in the town.

Struga is the home-city of the Miladinov brothers poets who played a crucial part in the Bulgarian national revival and in whose honor the Struga Poetry Evenings are held in the city. Struga was also the birthplace for a number of IMARO revolutionaries such as Hristo Matov.

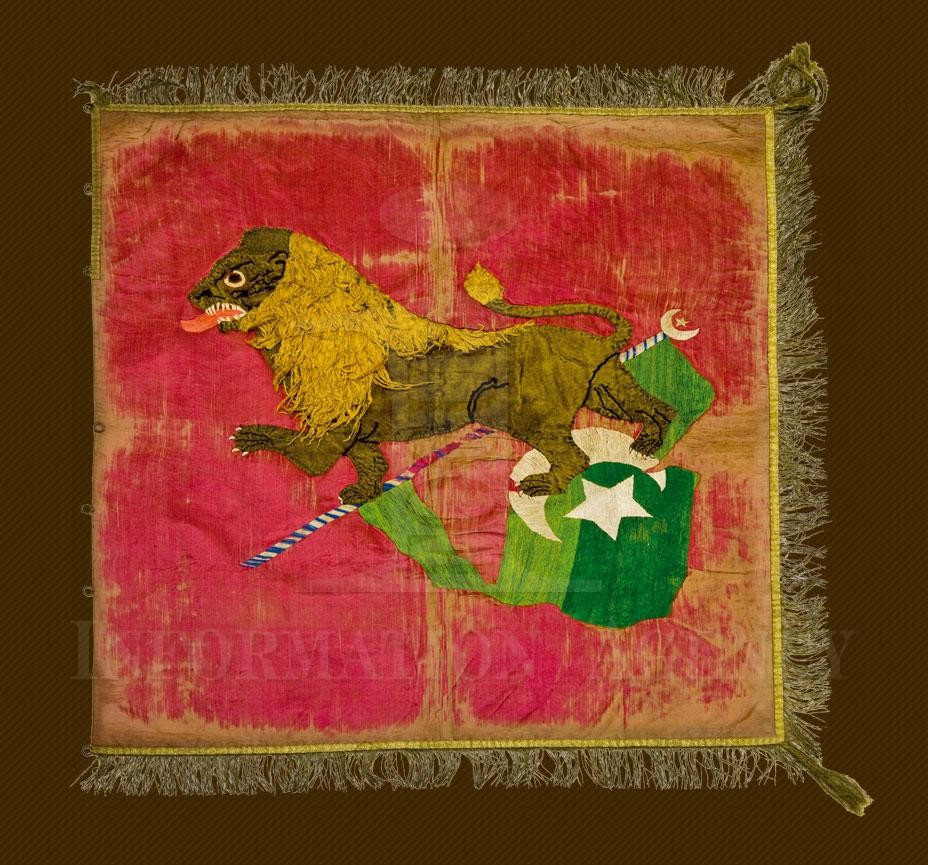
Flag of the Struga insurgents 1903

Struga was a site of the Macedonian Struggle. The IMRO member Hristo Uzunov was appointed "region inspector" of Ohrid, Struga and Kičevo, to "clean the regions of spies, traitors, pro-Greeks and Vrhovist chetas".

During World War I, the Bulgarian-supported VMRO had a local revolutionary committee that was to join in the uprising against the Kingdom of Serbia, meant to support Ottoman–Bulgarian fight against Serbia and Greece. At the beginning of 1916, the Bulgarian army entered Struga, Debar and Elbasan.

Struga was part of the Yugoslav Socialist Republic of Macedonia since 1945 until the 1991 Macedonian independence referendum when North Macedonia peacefully seceded from the federation. In the post-independence period, the town continued to function as a local administrative (municipality seat), cultural and tourist centre for the surrounding lakeside area.

== Demographics ==
During the 16th century, Struga was located in the Sanjak of Ohrid of the Ottoman Empire. It was registered as a Christian village in the nahiya of Ohrid with 184 Christian families, 20 unmarried men and 36 widows, as well as 8 Muslim families. In the 19th century, Hahn estimated 611 houses, of which 361 Christian on the left, and 220 Muslim and 30 Christian houses, on the right side of the river.

Serbian writer Branislav Nušić visited the area and counted 836 houses, out of which c. 500 were "mostly Serb" (Orthodox Christian Slavic) and 336 were "Turk", in 1892. Slaveykov (1898) estimated 620 houses. Bulgarian researcher Vasil Kanchov wrote in 1900 that Struga was inhabited by 4,570 people, consisting of 3,000 Christian Bulgarians, 1,000 Turks, 350 Muslim Albanians and 220 Romanis; he noted that many of the Albanians declared themselves Turks.

According to the 2021 census, the settlement of Struga had 15,009 inhabitants, compared with 16,559 in the 2002 census. For municipal-level demographic data, see Struga Municipality.

City of Struga population according to ethnic group 1948–2021
Ethnic group	census 1948		census 1953		census 1961		census 1971		census 1981		census 1994		census 2002		census 2021	
Ethnic group	Number	%	Number	%	Number	%	Number	%	Number	%	Number	%	Number	%	Number	%
Macedonians	..	..	2,194	43.9	3,423	49.9	6,215	54.2	8,002	55.9	9,433	58.9	8,901	53.8	6,517	43.4
Albanians	..	..	1,109	22.2	1,649	24.1	3,508	30.6	4,149	29.0	4,330	27.0	5,293	32.0	4,903	32.7
Turks	..	..	927	18.6	994	14.5	730	6.4	832	5.8	887	5.5	927	5.6	810	5.4
Roma	..	..	141	2.8	0	0.0	12	0.1	421	2.9	114	0.7	97	0.6	141	0.9
Vlachs/Aromanians	..	..	536	10.7	0	0.0	0	0.0	337	2.4	462	2.9	550	3.3	431	2.9
Serbs	..	..	42	0.9	54	0.8	106	0.9	84	0.6	91	0.6	72	0.4	49	0.3
Bosniaks	..	..	0	0.0	0	0.0	0	0.0	0	0.0	0	0.0	16	0.1	23	0.2
Others/undeclared	..	..	47	1.0	737	10.8	904	7.9	500	3.5	720	4.5	723	4.4	574	3.8
Persons for whom data are taken from administrative sources															1,561	10.4
Total	4,923		4,996		6,857		11,475		14,325		16,037		16,559		15,009	

According to the 2002 census, the religious composition of the city was:

- Orthodox Christians, 9,197 (55.5%)
- Muslims, 7,075 (42.7%)
- others, 287 (1.7%)

The Gheg and Tosk dialects of Albanian are both spoken by Albanians in Struga, with speakers historically divided in the settlement by the Black Drin. The Albanian spoken in Struga has been described as transitional between Central Gheg and Northern Tosk, with differences mainly in phonetics and morphology. Until the last few decades of the 20th century, Albanian Tosk, in particular the geographically central variety of the dialect, dominated among speakers of Albanian in Struga. The local Romani and Turkish populations of Struga have also been described as speaking and singing in the southern Tosk Albanian dialect.

== Culture ==
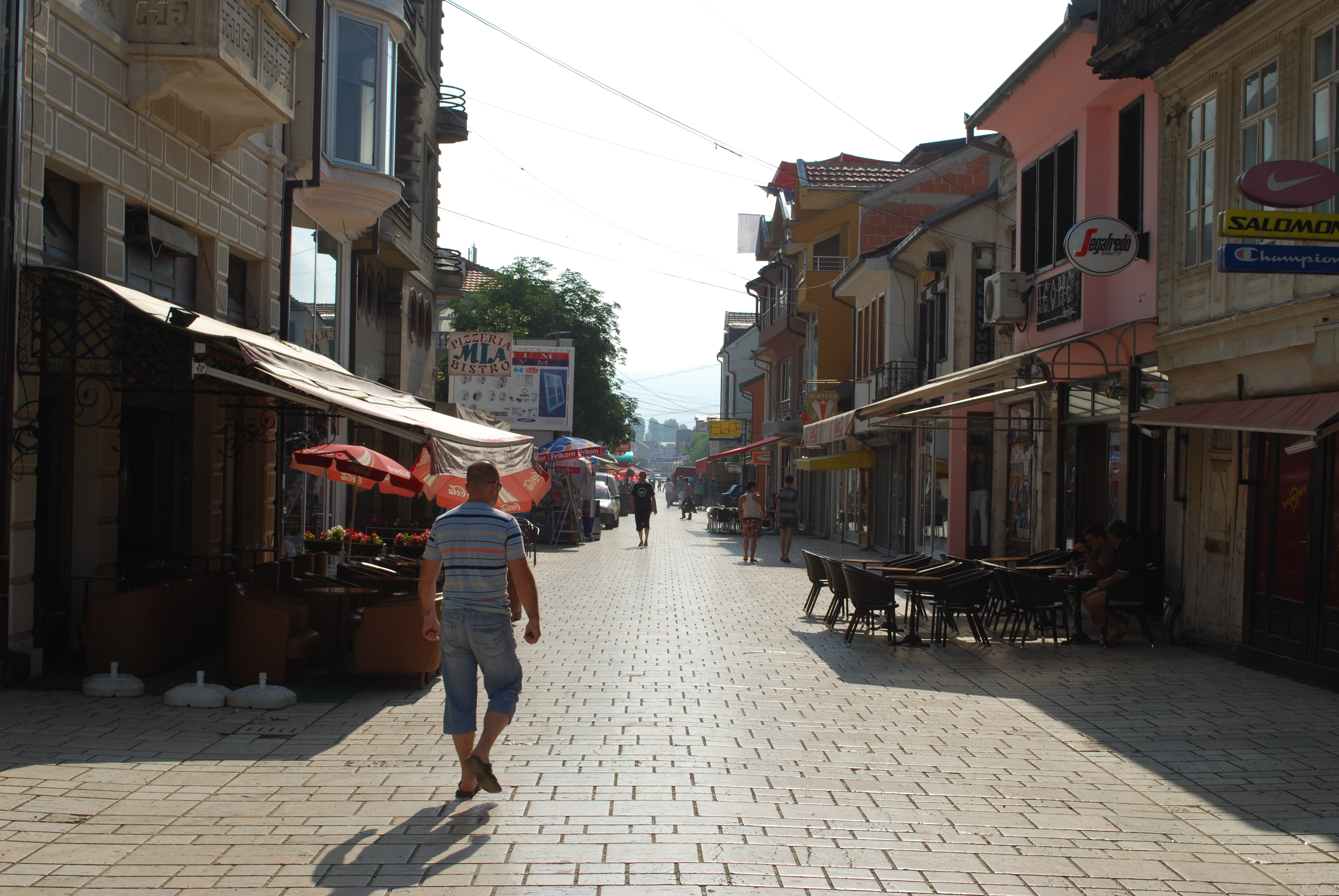
Old pedestrian street of Struga.

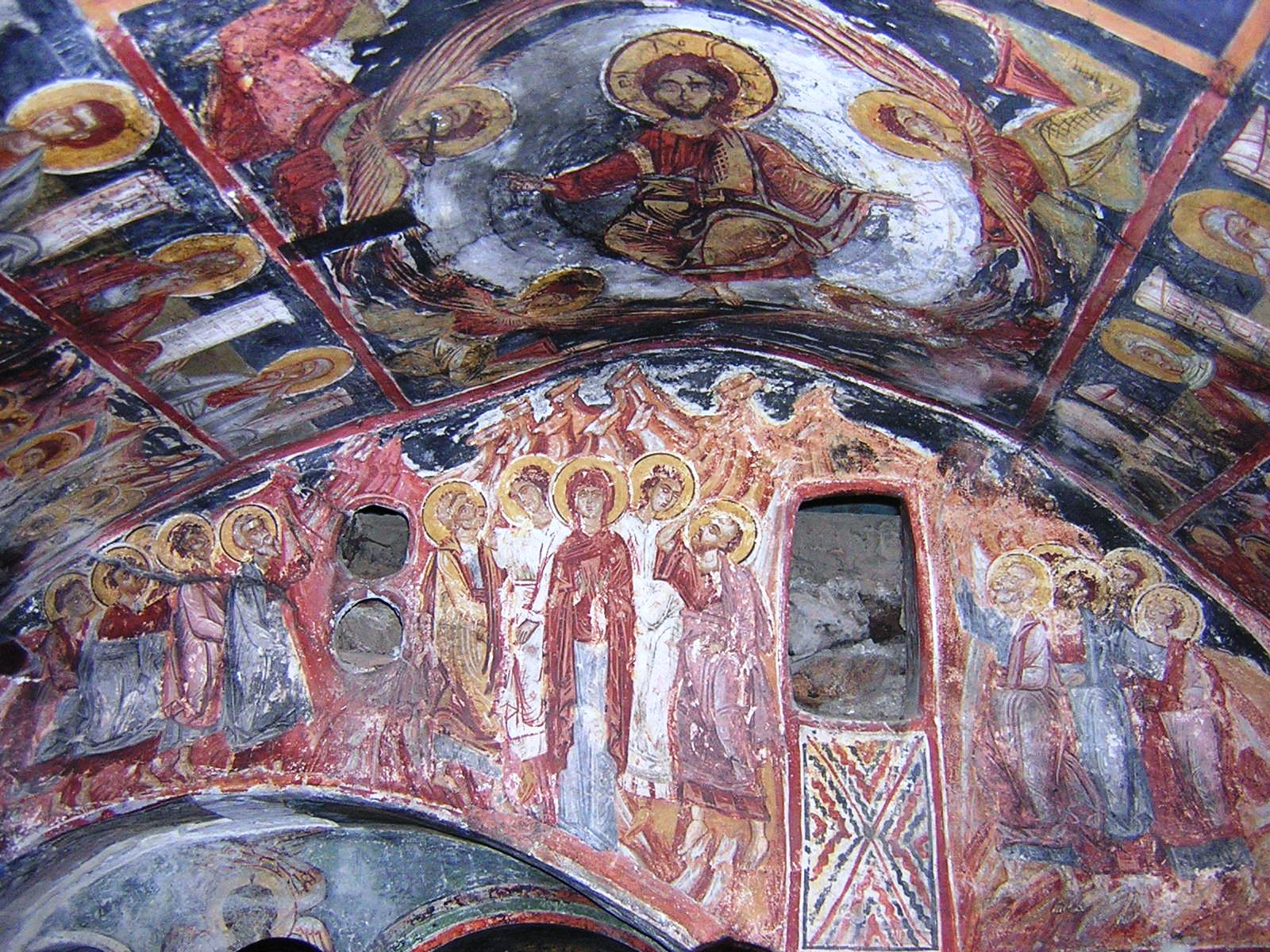
Frescoes from the rock church in the monastery of Kališta.

Struga is also a place of important cultural significance in North Macedonia, as it is the birthplace of the poets Konstantin and Dimitar Miladinov.

The main event of the cultural life in Struga is the world's largest poetry gathering, Struga Poetry Evenings, whose laureates have included several Nobel Prize for Literature winners such as

- Joseph Brodsky,
- Eugenio Montale,
- Pablo Neruda,
- Seamus Heaney,
- Fazıl Hüsnü Dağlarca

and many others since 1966.

There are several cultural monuments in Struga and in its vicinity such as

- the Monastery of Kališta, a few kilometers away from the town center, lying on the shore of Lake Ohrid. It is believed that it dates from the 16th century, with frescoes from the 14th and the 15th centuries.
- Another rock church is present in the neighbouring village of Radožda with frescoes from the 13th and 14th centuries.
- The Church of Sveta Bogorodica (St Mary) in Vraništa, is believed to be where Tsar Samuel was crowned.
- The church of St. George is also located in the town; built on top of Samuel's church, it has many icons from the 14th, 15th, and 16th centuries.
- Near the village of Radolishta, a basilica from the 4th century was discovered, with a mosaic.

Struga's old architecture dates from the 18th and 19th centuries.

== Sports ==
Football is one of the main sports in Struga. FC Struga, also known as Struga Trim-Lum, has competed in the Macedonian First Football League and won back-to-back national league titles in the 2022–23 and 2023–24 seasons. FK Karaorman is another football club from the town and has also played in the Macedonian First Football League. Vllaznimi competes in the Macedonian Third League.

== Economy ==
The local economy is closely connected with tourism due to Struga's location on Lake Ohrid. Other economic activities in and around the town include services, small businesses, trade and tourism-related activities.

=== Tourism ===
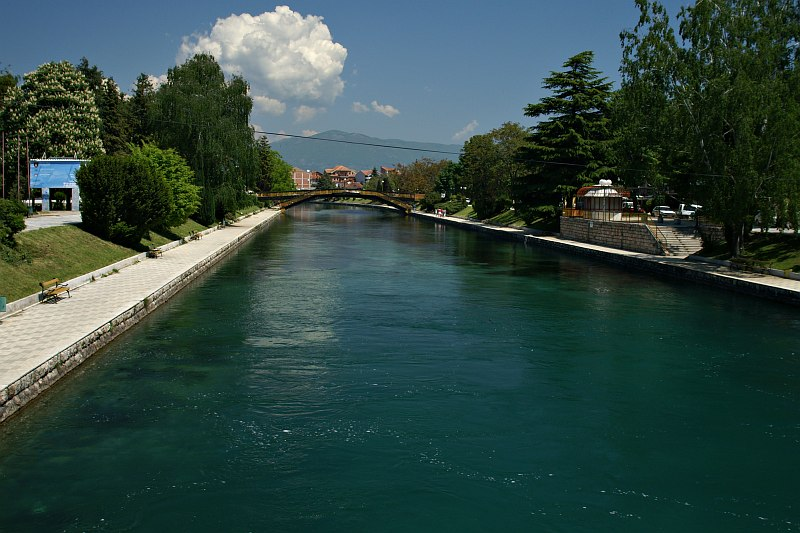
The Black Drin river flowing through the city.

Much of the town's income is through internal tourism. Struga's location on Lake Ohrid makes it a popular vacation spot.

Other attractions include the house of the Miladinovci Brothers, the old bazaar, the centuries-old churches and mosques.

Before the evenings you can enjoy on three kinds of beaches called "Male beach" (Maška plaža), "Female beach" (Ženska plaža) and "Seagull" (Galeb), located just before the estuary of the river Crn Drim (Black Drim) in its own flow, and between the two previous beaches. Just in front of the "Male beach", at the estuary of the river Crn Drim is located the biggest 5-star hotel in Struga, Hotel Drim.

Out of town there is another tourist place near the lake called Biser (Pearl), also a hotel.

Every August the Struga Poetry Evenings (SPE) are held at the "Poetry Bridge" (Macedonian: Струшки Вечери на Поезијата) and are attended by poets, writers and artists from across the world.

Churches

- St. George Church – from the 13th century
- St. Nicholas Church
- Church of the Myrrhbearing Women

== Notable people ==
- Miladinov brothers, writers, poets, folklorists
- Vlado Malevski, author of the Denes nad Makedonija
- Mimoza Nestorova-Tomić, architect
- Ibrahim Temo (1865–?), Ottoman doctor and founder of the Ottoman reformist Committee of Union and Progress.

== International relations ==
=== Twin towns – Sister cities ===
Struga is twinned with:

- Büyükçekmece, Turkey
- Mangalia, Romania
- Waterbury, Connecticut, United States
- Famagusta, Northern Cyprus

== Sources ==
- Barišić, Franjo (1964). "Два грчка натписа". Зборник радова Византолошког института. VIII (2). Византолошки институт: 13–.
- Kostić, Kosta N. (1922). "Струга [Struga]". Наши нови градови на Југу. Застава.
- Maleski, Vlado (1970). Струга и Струшко: историја, стопанство, култура, уметност, образовање, здравство, физичка култура. Собранието на општина.
- Trifunoski, Jovan F. (1992). Охридско-струшка област [Ohrid–Struga Province]. Српска академија наука и уметности. OCLC 27418468.
- Trifunoski, Jovan F. (1986). Cincari u Strugi [Tzintzars in Struga]. Етнографски институт.
- Trifunoski, Jovan F. (1981). "Струга" [Struga]. Земља и људи. 31. Српско географско друштво.
- Velev, Ilija (1990). Преглед на средновековни цркви и манастири во Македонија. Naša kniga. ISBN 978-86-373-0258-2.
- Velev, Ilija (2005). Византиско-македонски книжевни врски. И. Велев. ISBN 978-9989-57-366-8.
