= Dragor (river) =

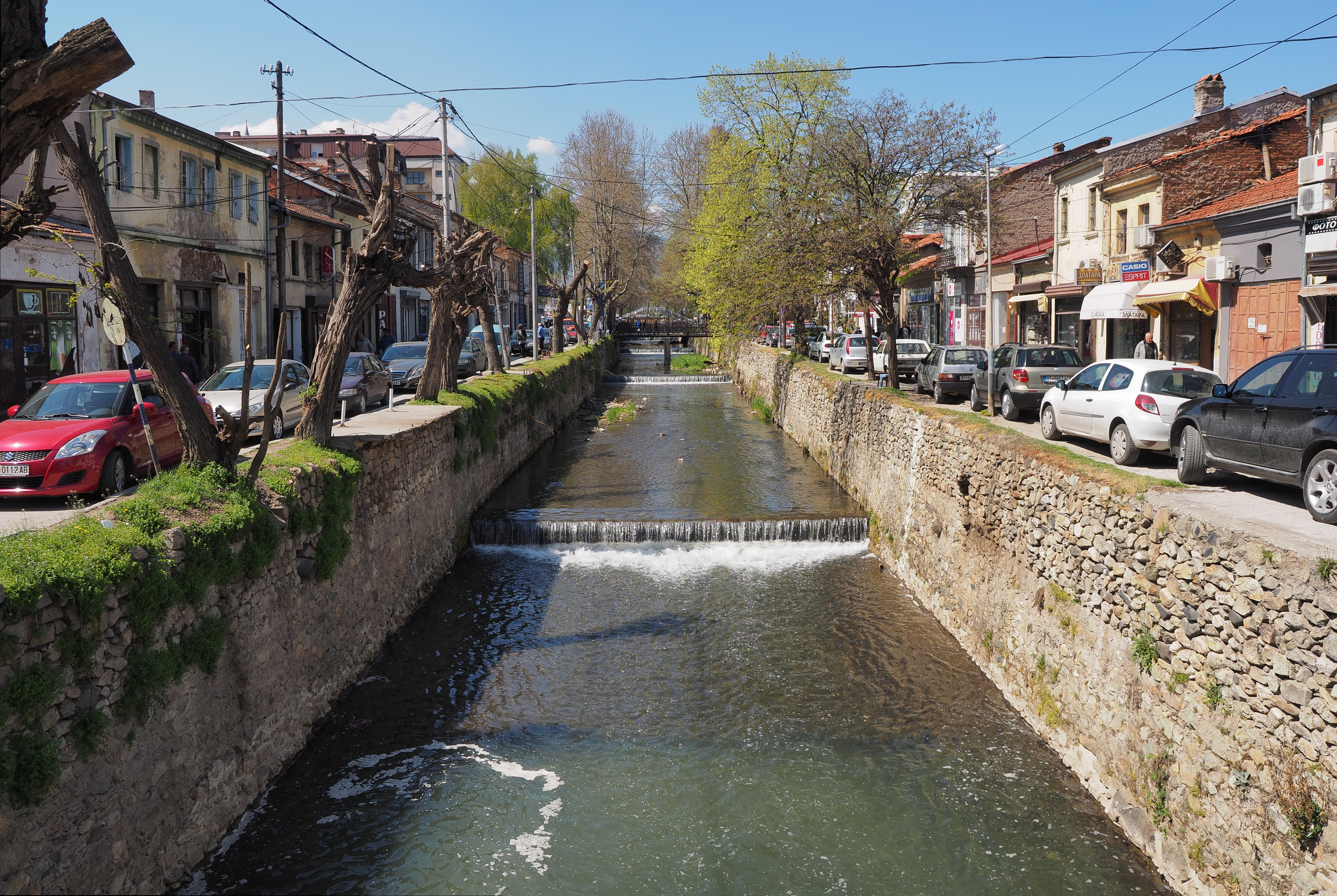
- The river in the centre of Bitola

Location
- Country: North Macedonia

Physical characteristics
- Mouth
  - location: Crna
  - coordinates: 41.0471°N 21.4365°E

Basin features
- Progression: Crna→ Vardar→ Aegean Sea

The Dragor (Macedonian: Драгор) is a small river situated in the south of North Macedonia. Stretching 25 km (16 mi), it flows mainly through the city of Bitola before joining the Crna river. Its catchment area encompasses about 37.2 square kilometres with four main tributaries originating on the eastern slopes of Baba Mountain within Pelister National Park. The river shows significant seasonal flow variations, with peak discharges during April and May, moderate flows between November and March, and lowest levels from July to October. Classified as having third-class water quality due to elevated copper levels from urban runoff and industrial waste, the Dragor holds cultural importance in Bitola, where it has inspired numerous local idioms reflecting its historical relationship with the community.

== Hydrology and geography ==
The Dragor River's catchment area includes four primary tributaries originating on the eastern slopes of Baba Mountain within Pelister National Park: Crvena Reka, Ezerska Reka (also known as Lak Potok), Sapundjica, and Stara Buka. The total catchment covers roughly 37.2 square kilometres, with each sub-catchment contributing differently to the overall water flow. The hydrological regime of the Dragor River is characterized by significant seasonal variation, with high flow periods occurring during April and May, moderate flows between November and March, and lowest water levels from July to October. The estimated average monthly flows of the Dragor River range from a low of 158 litres per second in August to highs around 1,871 litres per second in May.

== Environmental flow assessment ==
A detailed hydrological study on the Dragor River led to the development of an improved method for determining the river's environmental flow, adapting the widely-used Tennant–Montana method to the local hydrological conditions. The original Tennant–Montana method calculates environmental flow as a fixed percentage of a river's mean annual flow, divided into two seasonal periods. However, this standard approach was not suitable for Dragor due to significant seasonal variability in water availability. Therefore, researchers modified this method by defining three distinct periods based on Dragor's flow regime: a high-flow period (April–May), a moderate-flow period (November–March, June), and a low-flow period (July–October). Each period received a tailored percentage of the mean flow—10%, 15%, and 30%, respectively—to better reflect and protect the local aquatic habitats throughout the year.

== Water quality ==
The Dragor River has chemical characteristics reflecting significant anthropogenic influence from urban sources, particularly from the city of Bitola. It is officially classified as third-class water quality, indicating moderate contamination according to Macedonian environmental regulations. Elevated levels of copper were detected in the river's water samples, attributed primarily to urban runoff and industrial waste from Bitola. These measurements place Dragor among water bodies experiencing environmental stress due to the ongoing impact of human activities on its ecosystem.

== Cultural and linguistic significance ==
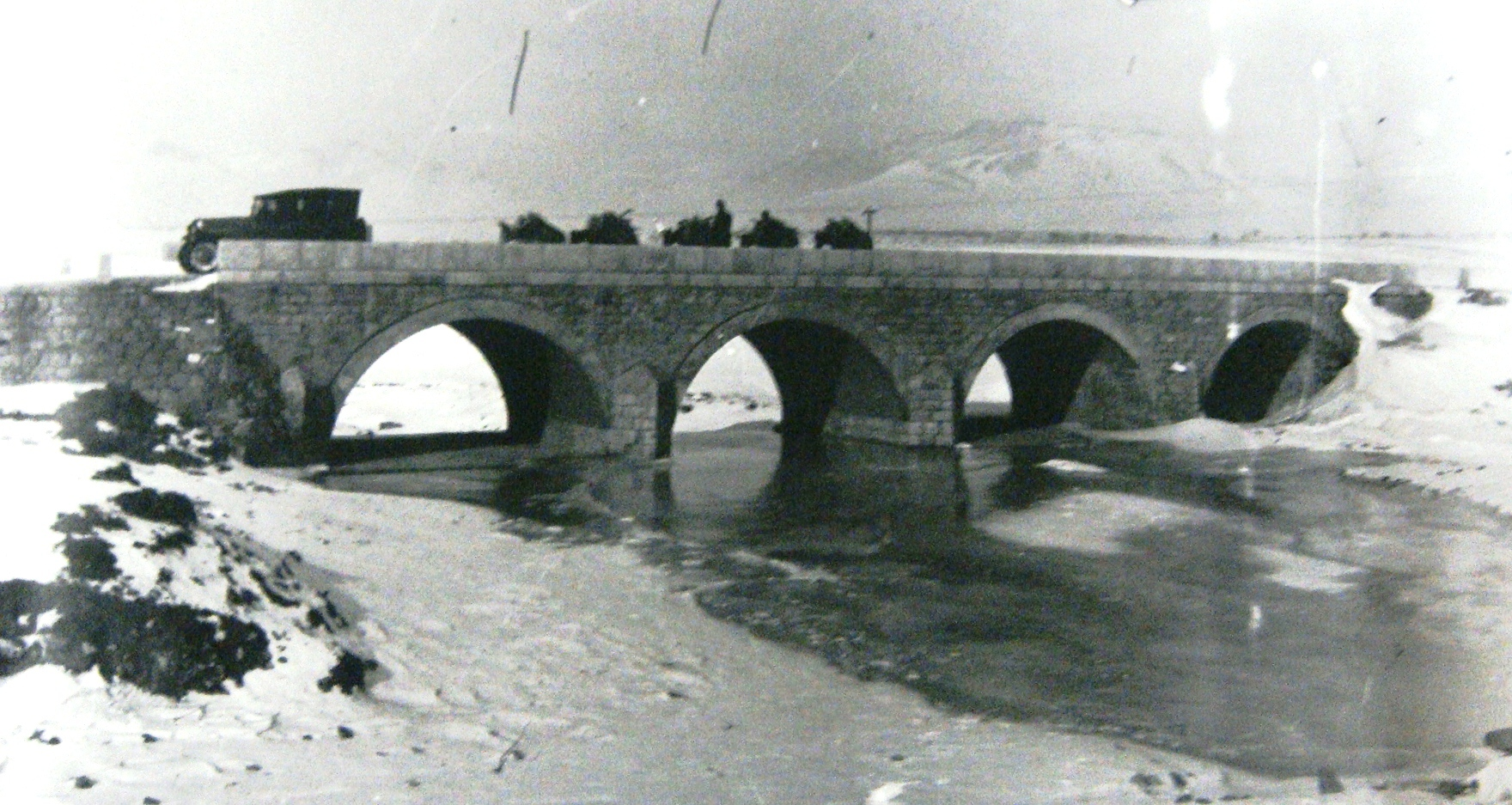
Bridge on the River Dragor near Dovledzik area in Bitola, 1916

The Dragor River, running through Bitola (historically known as Manastır), holds cultural importance through local idiomatic expressions derived from historical events and daily life around the river. These idioms, embedded deeply in the region's folklore, illustrate the interplay between geography and language. Examples include Haydi oradan, sen bana Dragor’un nereden aktığını söyleyeceksin! ("Come on, are you telling me where Dragor flows from?"), implying unnecessary explanation of common knowledge, and Dragor’da atık yiyecek aramayasın? ("Are you looking for waste food in Dragor?"), historically reflecting the practices of impoverished locals scavenging discarded produce from the river. Another idiom, Dragor getirdi, Dragor götürdü ("Dragor brought it, Dragor took it away"), denotes fleeting circumstances, while Dragor, vergisini aldı! ("Dragor has taken its tax!") refers to the belief that the river occasionally claims lives as a symbolic tribute following tragic events. These expressions illustrate Dragor's significance in the local cultural and linguistic landscape.
