= Black Drin =

River in Albania and North Macedonia

Black Drin Black Drim
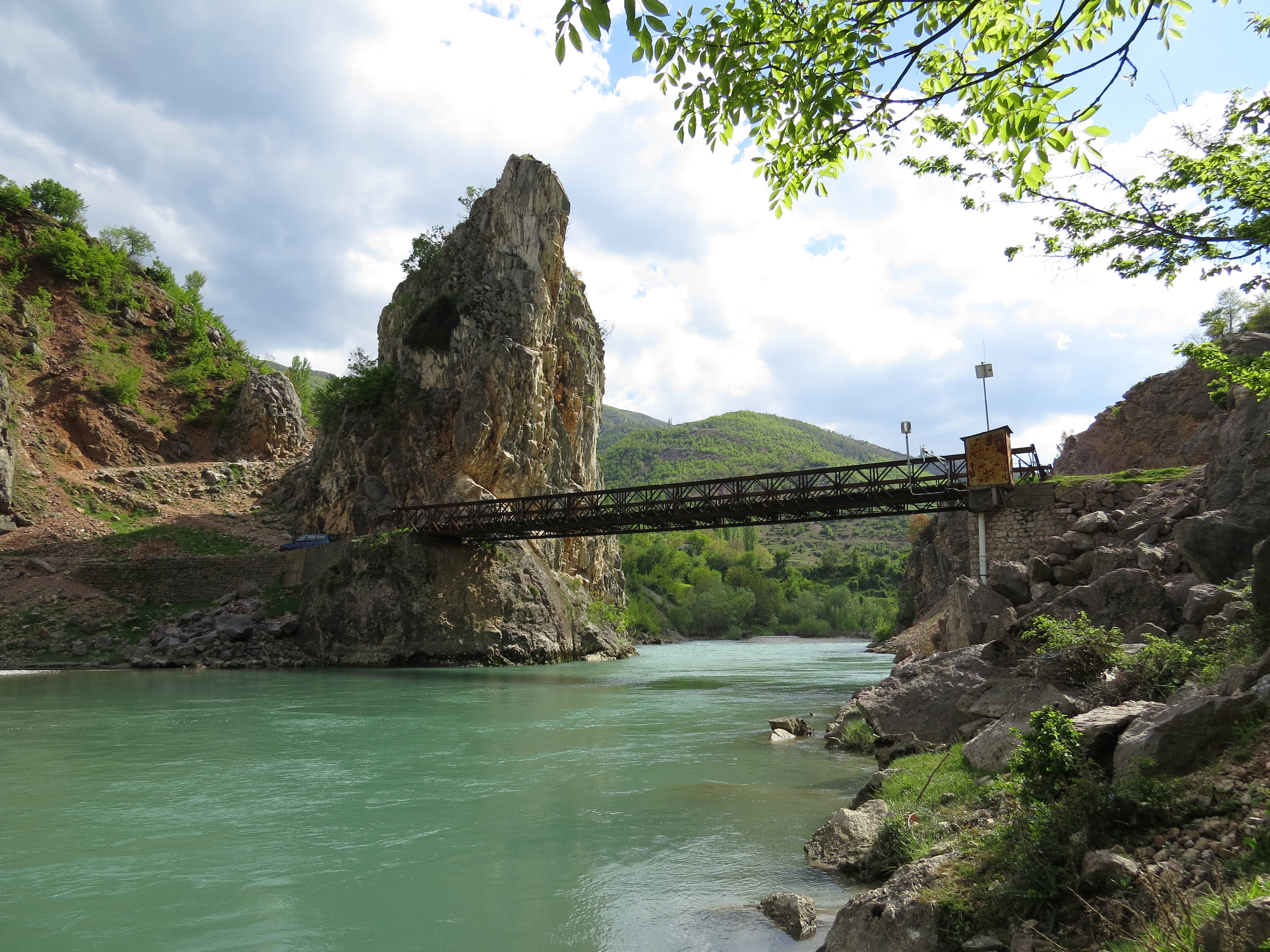
- Black Drin
- Native name: Drini i Zi (Albanian); Црн Дрим (Macedonian)

Location
- Countries: North Macedonia; Albania

Physical characteristics
- Source
  - location: Lake Ohrid
- Mouth
  - location: Drin
  - coordinates: 42°5′30″N 20°23′41″E
- Length: 149 km (93 mi)
- Basin size: 3,504 km^{2} (1,353 sq mi)
- Discharge
  - average: 118 m^{3}/s (4,200 cu ft/s)

Basin features
- Progression: Drin→ Adriatic Sea

The Black Drin or Black Drim (Albanian: Drini i Zi; Macedonian: Црн Дрим, romanized: Crn Drim), is a river in North Macedonia and Albania. It flows out of lake Ohrid in Struga, North Macedonia. It is 149 km (93 mi) long and its drainage basin is 3,504 km^{2} (1,353 sq mi). Its average discharge is 118 m^{3}/s (4,200 cu ft/s). After flowing through North Macedonia for 56 km (35 mi), the Black Drin crosses the border to Albania, west of Debar. It merges with the White Drin in Kukës to form the Drin, which flows into the Adriatic Sea. It drains most of the eastern border region of Albania.

== Etymology ==
The name is ancient - Drinius, Trinius (Pliny), Δρεῖνος (Ptolemy). Its origin is Illyrian from older *Drūn, from Indo-European *drū- into Old Indian drāvayate, run, flow, Avestan dru, run.

== Agriculture ==
This part of Albania is an agricultural area. The main agricultural products are maize and barley; silviculture is evolving, as well. The Ohrid trout, which is a form of salmon, can also sometimes be found in parts of the river.

== Gallery ==
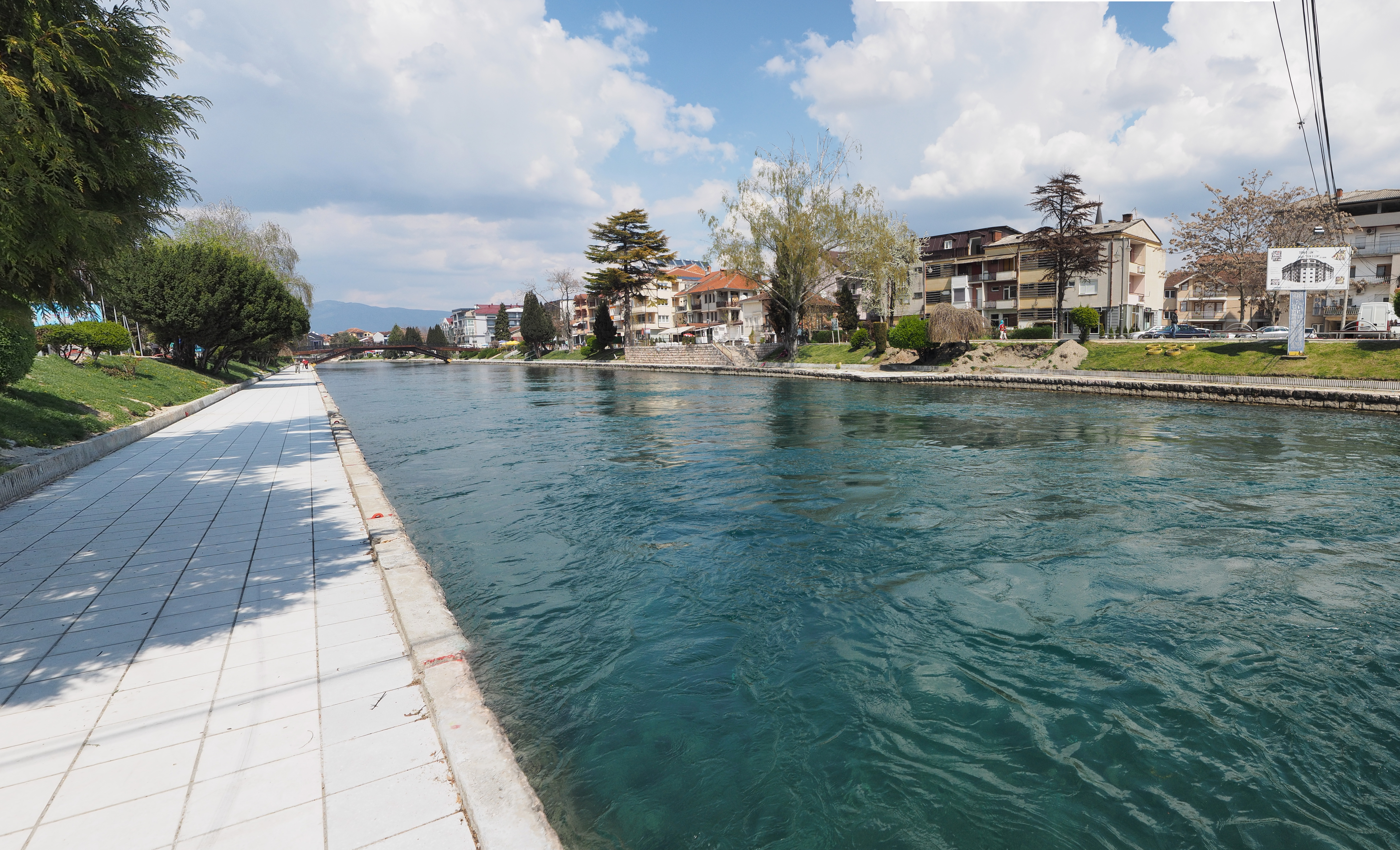
Black Drin in Struga

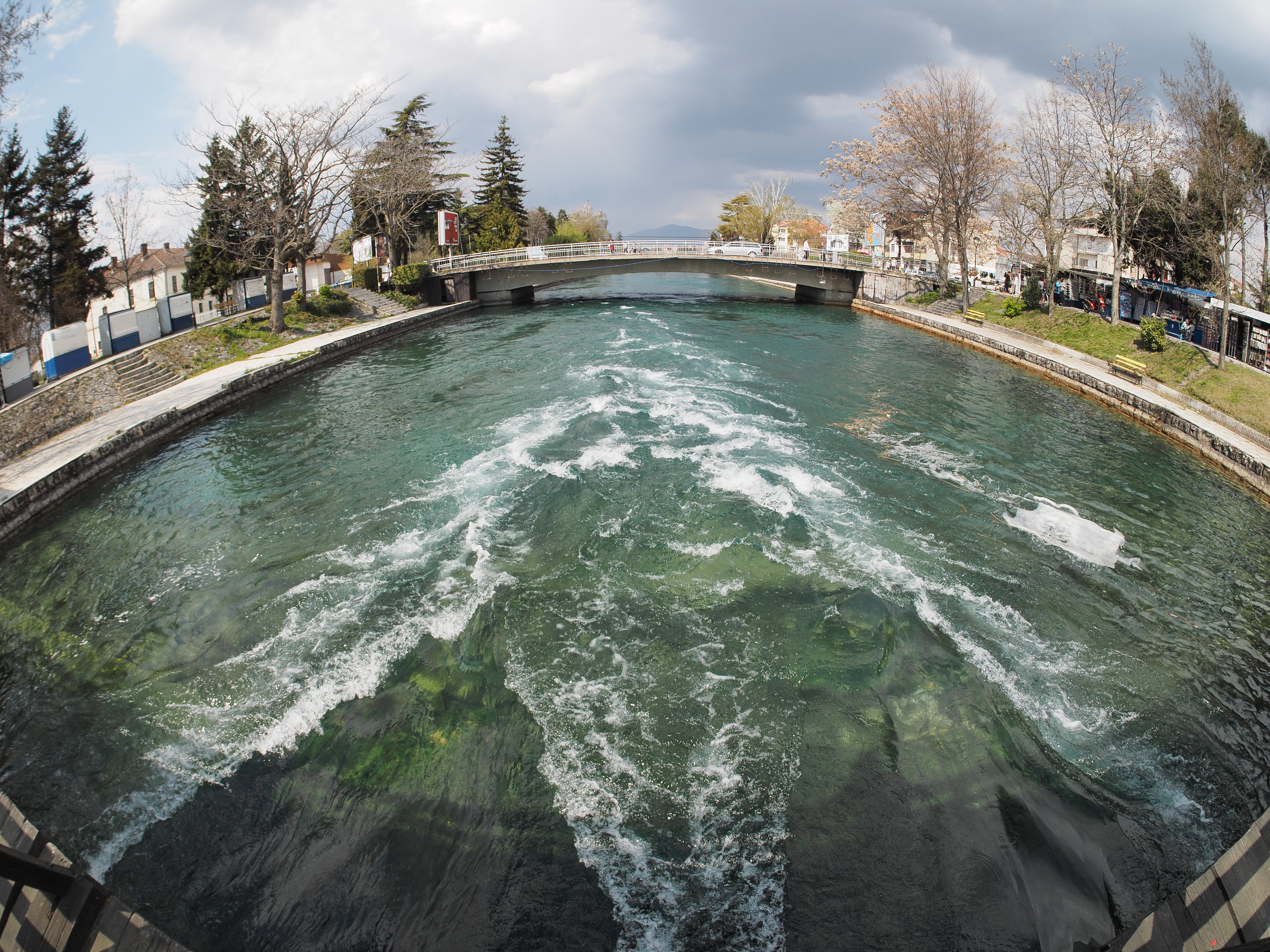
Black Drin flowing out of Lake Ohrid
