= Masal Tsot =

Street food in Kashmir, India

- Type: Street food
- Place of origin: India
- Region or state: Jammu & Kashmir
- Associated cuisine: Indian
- Serving temperature: Hot or room temperature

Masal Tsot (Kashmiri pronunciation: [masaːlɨ t͡soʈ]), is a traditional street food wrap consisting of Lavaas (Kashmiri pronunciation: [laʋaːs]) bread served with boiled chickpeas and a radish-yogurt chutney. It is consumed in the Kashmir Valley of Jammu and Kashmir, India. It is a traditionally popular for its portability and nutritional value.
