= Tantuni =

Turkish meat dish from Mersin

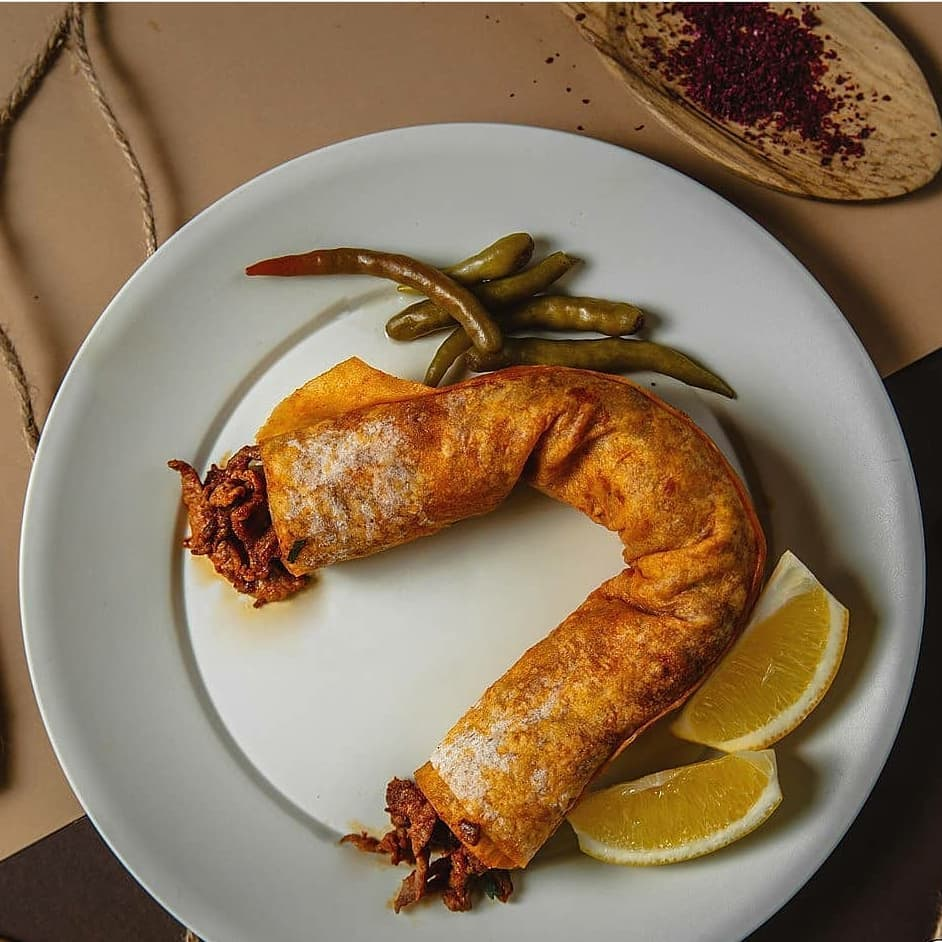
- A tantuni.
- Alternative names: Mersin tantunisi
- Type: Meat dish, Wrap
- Course: Main course, Street food
- Place of origin: Turkey
- Region or state: Mersin
- Serving temperature: Hot
- Main ingredients: Beef or lamb, cottonseed oil, onion, tomato, parsley, sumac, paprika

Tantuni is a spicy Turkish dish consisting of julienne cut beef or lamb, stir-fried on a unique traditional metal plate called a sac. Originating from the Mersin province in southern Turkey, it has become one of the country's most popular street foods.

Distinct from other Turkish kebabs or döner, tantuni is characterized by its specific cooking method involving a combination of boiling and frying, the use of cottonseed oil, and the ritual of steaming the bread atop the cooking meat. In 2017, "Mersin Tantunisi" was granted a Geographical Indication (GI) registration by the Turkish Patent and Trademark Office.

== Etymology ==
The origin of the word "tantuni" is uncertain, but a widely accepted urban legend suggests it is an onomatopoeic word. It is believed to derive from the "tan-tun" sounds produced when the metal spoon hits the metal sac (pan) rhythmically during the cooking process.

== History ==
While exact origins are debated, tantuni is rooted in the culinary traditions of Turkmen and Yörük (nomadic) tribes in the Mersin region. Historically, it was considered a "poor man's food". In its earliest forms (early to mid-20th century), it was primarily made from minced offal, specifically lung (akciğer) and beef fat, which were affordable.

Over time, starting from the 1970s and 1980s, the recipe evolved to appeal to a broader urban palate. The use of lungs was largely replaced by high-quality beef cuts (such as ribeye or flank), elevating tantuni from a frugal meal to a sought-after delicacy.

== Preparation ==
The preparation of authentic tantuni involves specific stages and equipment:

=== Ingredients ===
- Meat: While lamb can be used, modern tantuni typically uses beef. The preferred cut is veal buttock (tranç) or ribeye, which must be free of sinew. The meat is cut into very small julienne strips or tiny cubes.
- Oil: Authentic Mersin tantuni strictly uses cottonseed oil (pamuk yağı). This oil is preferred for its high smoke point, neutral flavor, and ability to stay light without solidifying quickly on the plate.
- Spices: The primary seasonings are salt, sumac, and red pepper flakes (pul biber).

=== Cooking Method ===
The dish is cooked on a sac, a large, convex metal griddle with a depression in the center.

1. Boiling: The meat is first boiled in salted water until tender.
2. Frying: The boiled meat is moved to the center of the hot sac where the oil and red pepper flakes are added.
3. Steaming: The chef regularly splashes small amounts of water into the hot oil. This creates a burst of steam. The bread (lavash or loaf) is immediately pressed onto the steaming meat to absorb the moisture, fat, and aroma. This process keeps the temperature controlled and ensures the meat remains moist rather than dry-fried.

== Serving and Variations ==
Tantuni is assembled quickly after ordering. The meat is placed into the bread and topped with a salad of chopped tomatoes (preferably skinless), parsley, and onions seasoned with sumac.

=== Presentation Styles ===
- Dürüm: The most common method, wrapped in a thin lavash flatbread.
- Ekmek Arası: Served inside a half-loaf of white Turkish bread (somun).
- Yoğurtlu Tantuni: A variation where the tantuni roll is sliced into bite-sized pieces (similar to Beyti kebab) and topped with garlic yogurt and melted butter sauce.

=== Accompaniments ===
It is traditionally served with lemon wedges, which are squeezed generously over the meat to cut through the oiliness. Side dishes almost always include small, hot pickled peppers (cin biber). The preferred beverages are Ayran (yogurt drink) or Şalgam (fermented turnip juice), which complement the spiciness of the dish.

== See also ==
- Turkish cuisine
- List of sandwiches
- Street food
- Kebab
