= Tandoor =

Cylindrical clay oven used in South Asian cooking

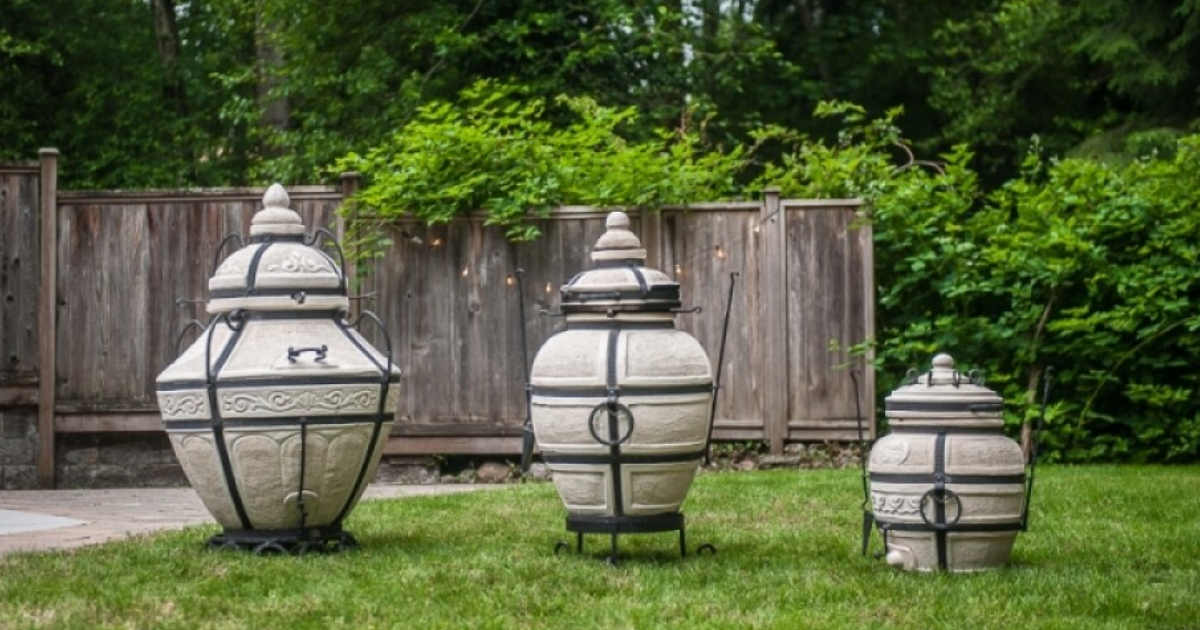
Modern ceramic wood-fired tandoors

A tandoor (/tænˈdʊər/ or /tɑːnˈdʊər/, Hindi: [t̪ən̪d̪uːɾ]) is a large vase-shaped oven, usually made of clay. Since antiquity, tandoors have been used to bake unleavened flatbreads, such as roti and traditional lavash, as well as leavened ones, such as naan and tandoor bread or matnakash. It is also used to roast meat and vegetables. Tandoors are predominantly used in South Asia, Western Asia, Central Asia, and the Horn of Africa.

The standard heating element of a tandoor is an internal charcoal or wood fire, which cooks food with direct heat and smoke. Tandoors can be fully above ground, or partially buried below ground, often reaching over a meter in height/depth. Temperatures in a tandoor can reach 480 °C (900 °F; 750 K), and they are routinely kept lit for extended periods. Therefore, traditional tandoors are usually found in restaurant kitchens. Modern tandoors are often made of metal. Variations, such as tandoors with gas or electric heating elements, are more common for at-home use.

== Etymology ==
The English word comes from the Hindustani tandūr, which came from Persian tanūr (تنور) and ultimately from the Akkadian word tinūru (𒋾𒂟), which consists of the parts tin 'mud' and nuro/nura 'fire' and is mentioned as early as in the Epic of Gilgamesh, cf. or Avestan tanûra and Middle Persian tanûr. In Sanskrit, the tandoor was named kandu.

== Operation ==
The first time a tandoor is used, the temperature must be gradually increased to condition the oven's interior. This step is crucial in ensuring the longevity of the tandoor. Conditioning can be done by starting a very small fire and slowly adding fuel to increase the amount of heat inside the tandoor gradually. Hairline cracks might form during conditioning; this is normal and will not interfere with the performance of the tandoor oven. When the oven cools off, the hairline cracks may barely be noticeable. They are essential in allowing the clay body of the tandoor to breathe (i.e. thermal expansion and contraction). The slower the temperature inside the tandoor increases during its first use, the fewer hairline cracks it will develop.

Modern tandoors

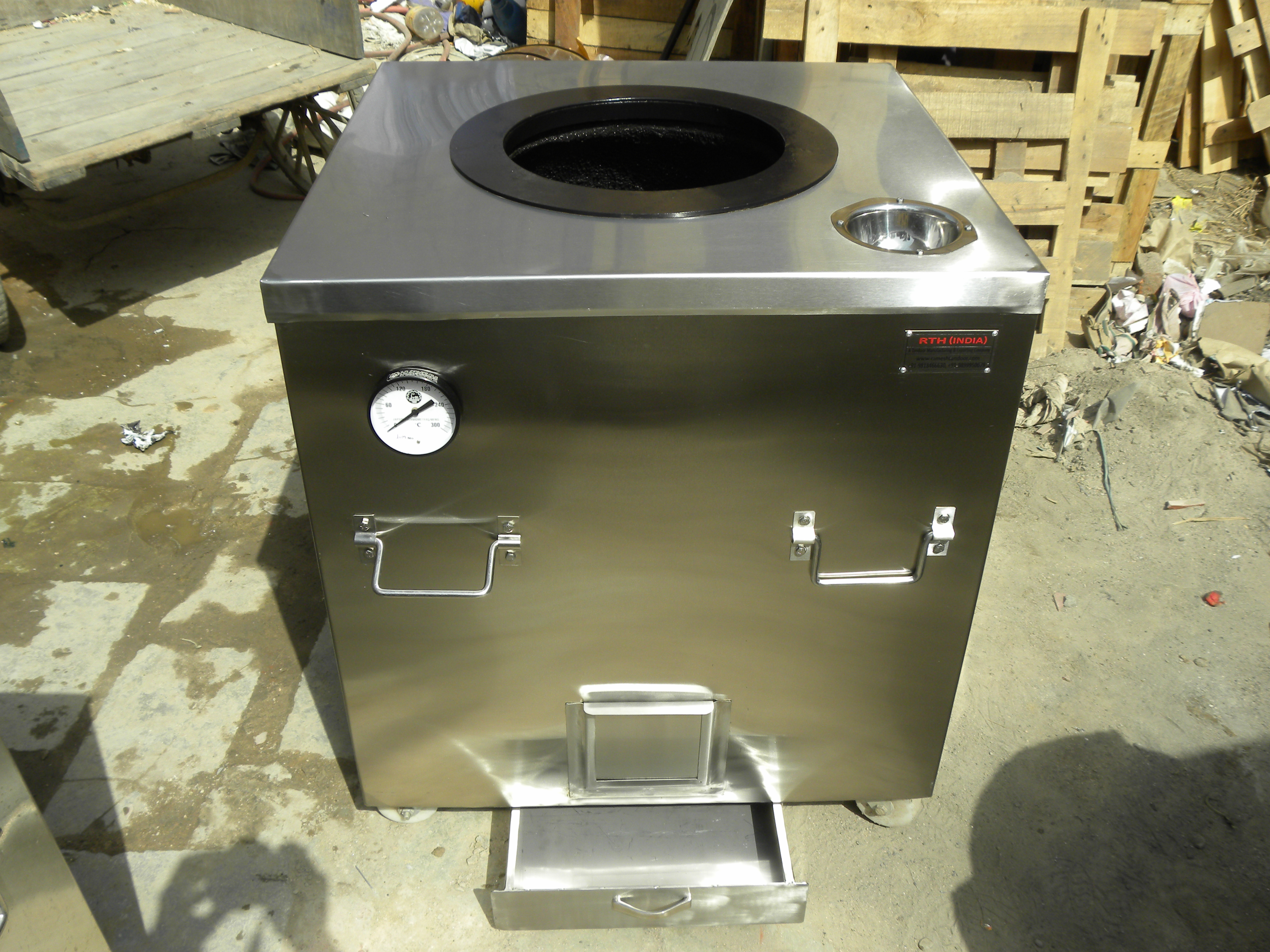
Charcoal-fired stainless-steel tandoor, with ash tray and thermometer

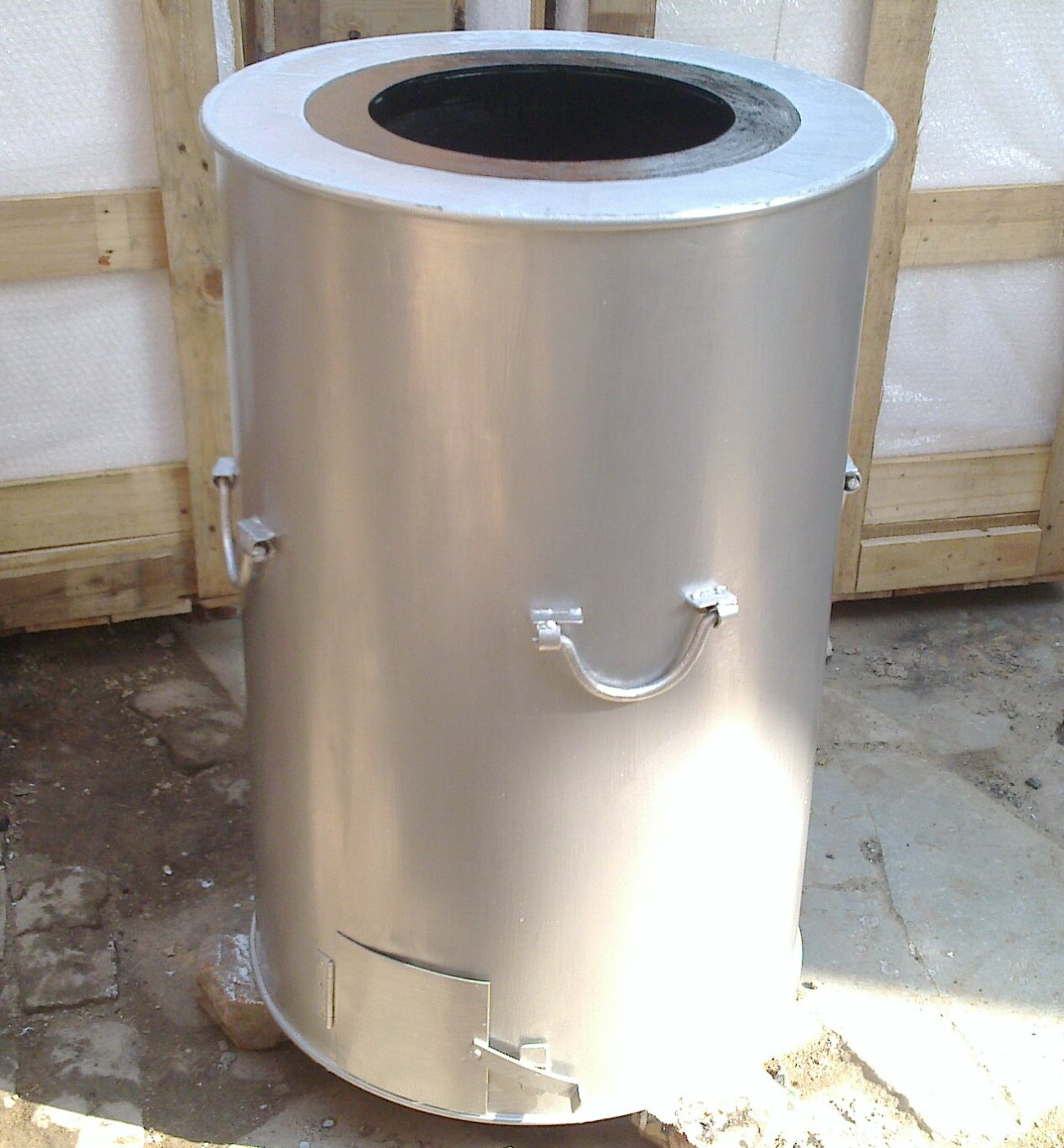
A coal-fired tandoor with a mild steel drum

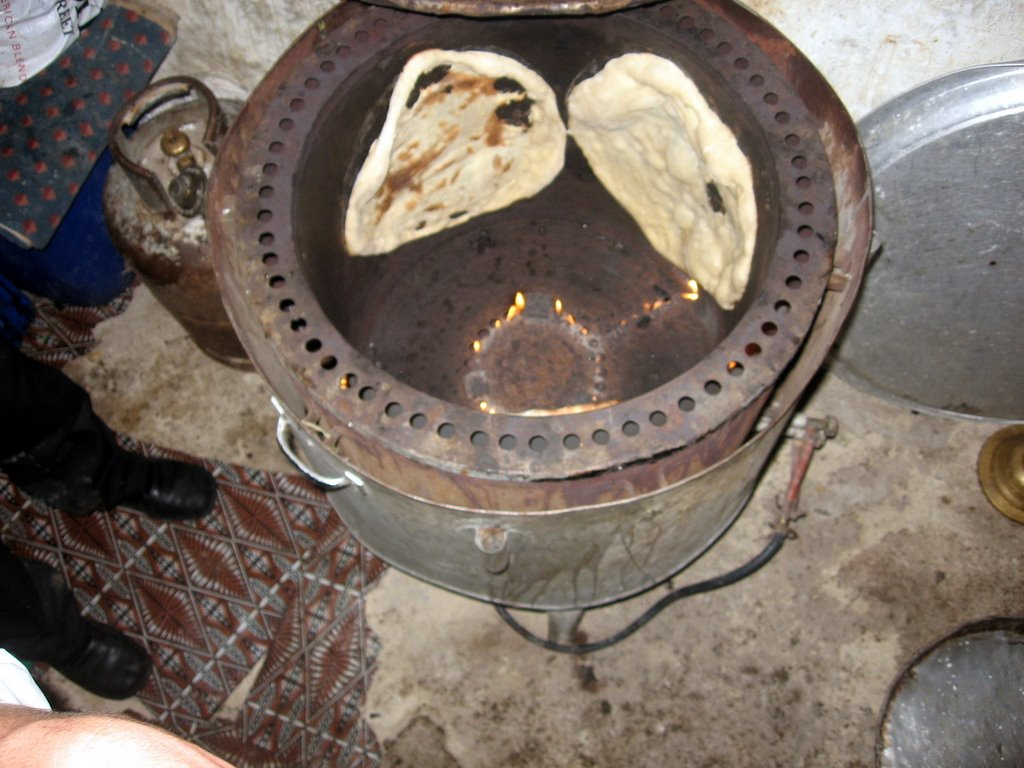
Yemeni modern tannour making Mulawah flatbread

== Types ==
=== West Asia and South Asia ===
==== Armenian tonir ====
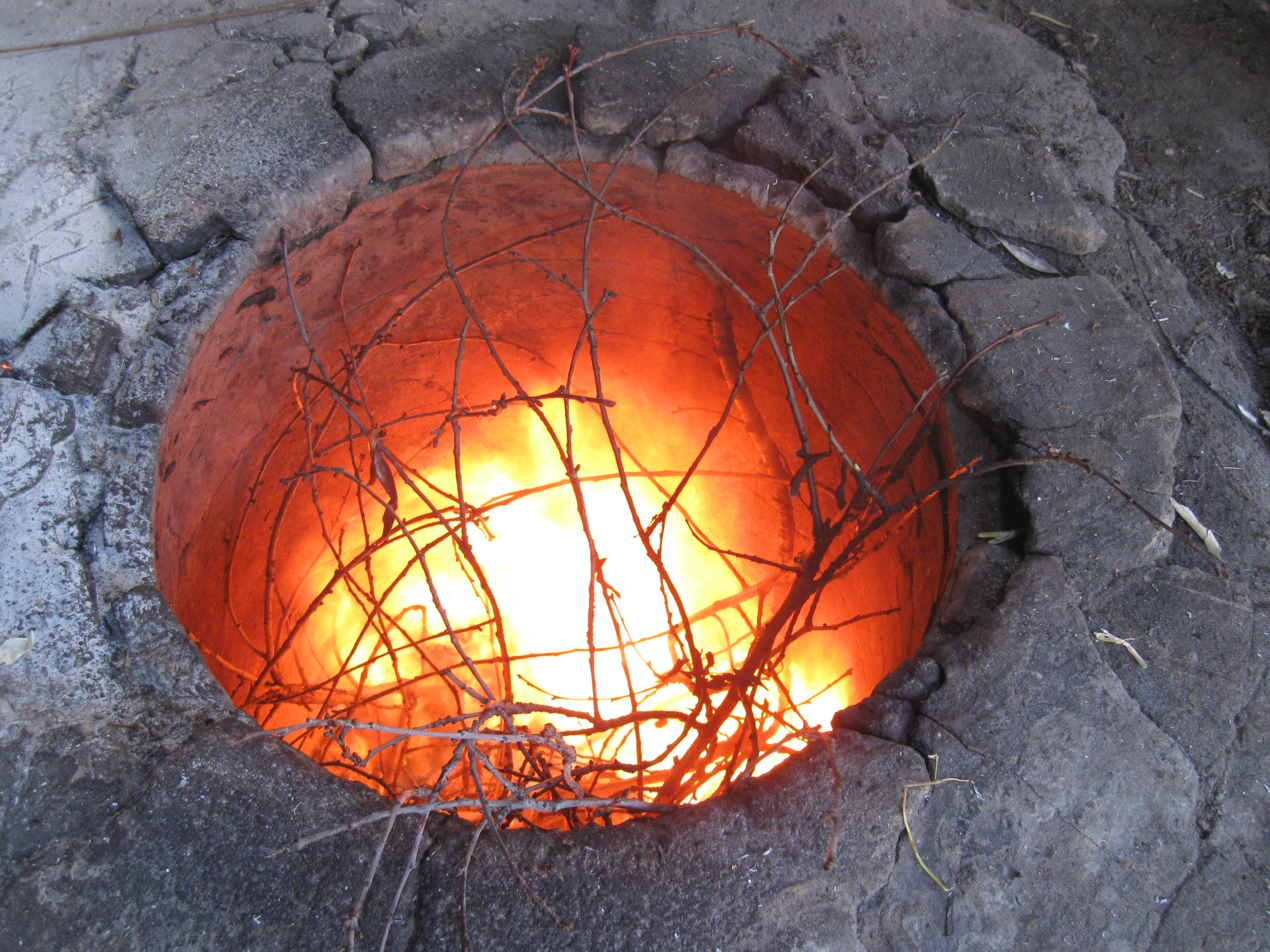
Armenian tonir oven

In Armenia, the oven is called tonir (Armenian: Թոնիր). In ancient times, it was worshipped by the Armenians as a symbol of the sun in the ground. Zoroastrian Armenians made tonirs resembling the setting sun "going into the ground" (the Sun being the main deity). The underground tonir, made of clay and stone, is one of the first tools in Armenian cuisine as an oven and thermal treatment tool. Therefore, the tonir used to be placed in the middle of most ancient Armenian households. Armenians are said to have invented the underground tonirs.

Multiple Armenian dishes are prepared using the tonir. Most of the dishes prepared by using a tonir are either breads, meats, or vegetables. The most popular bread dishes to be cooked by using a tonir are lavash, matnakash and tonir bread, also known as tonri hats (Armenian: թոնիր հաց). Lavash is a very thin flatbread used for wrapping meat, vegetables and other ingredients, while matnakash is thicker and used on the side. Matnakash is said to have a focaccia-like texture. Tonri hats is similar to matnakash, but what differentiates it from matnakash is its round shape and soft texture that resembles bhatura in a way. Some also use the tonir to bake filled sweet breads, like gata. The bread is baked by sticking it on the walls of the tonir, where it is evenly cooked. Armenian bread (especially tonir hats) is mainly flavored with black pepper, mahleb, sesame seeds, nigella seeds, cumin, and sometimes cinnamon, or anise.

Khorovats, khashlama, fish like the sevan trout, and khash are the most popular meat-dishes that are prepared by using a tonir. Khorovats is made by stacking seasoned meat (traditionally pork, but lamb and chicken are also common) and other ingredients like potatoes and onions on a skewer, before cooking them inside the tonir. Wet cloth is put on the opening of the tonir to cook the meat more efficiently and to create a smoky flavor. Armenian "tonir meats" are mostly spiced with black pepper, paprika, garlic, sumac, onions and in some regions, fenugreek.

Sometimes, Armenians only use vegetables to be cooked inside tonirs. In that case eggplants, tomatoes, bell peppers, onions, potatoes and other local Armenian vegetables, just like meat, are cooked inside tonirs.

Baking in the Armenian tonir

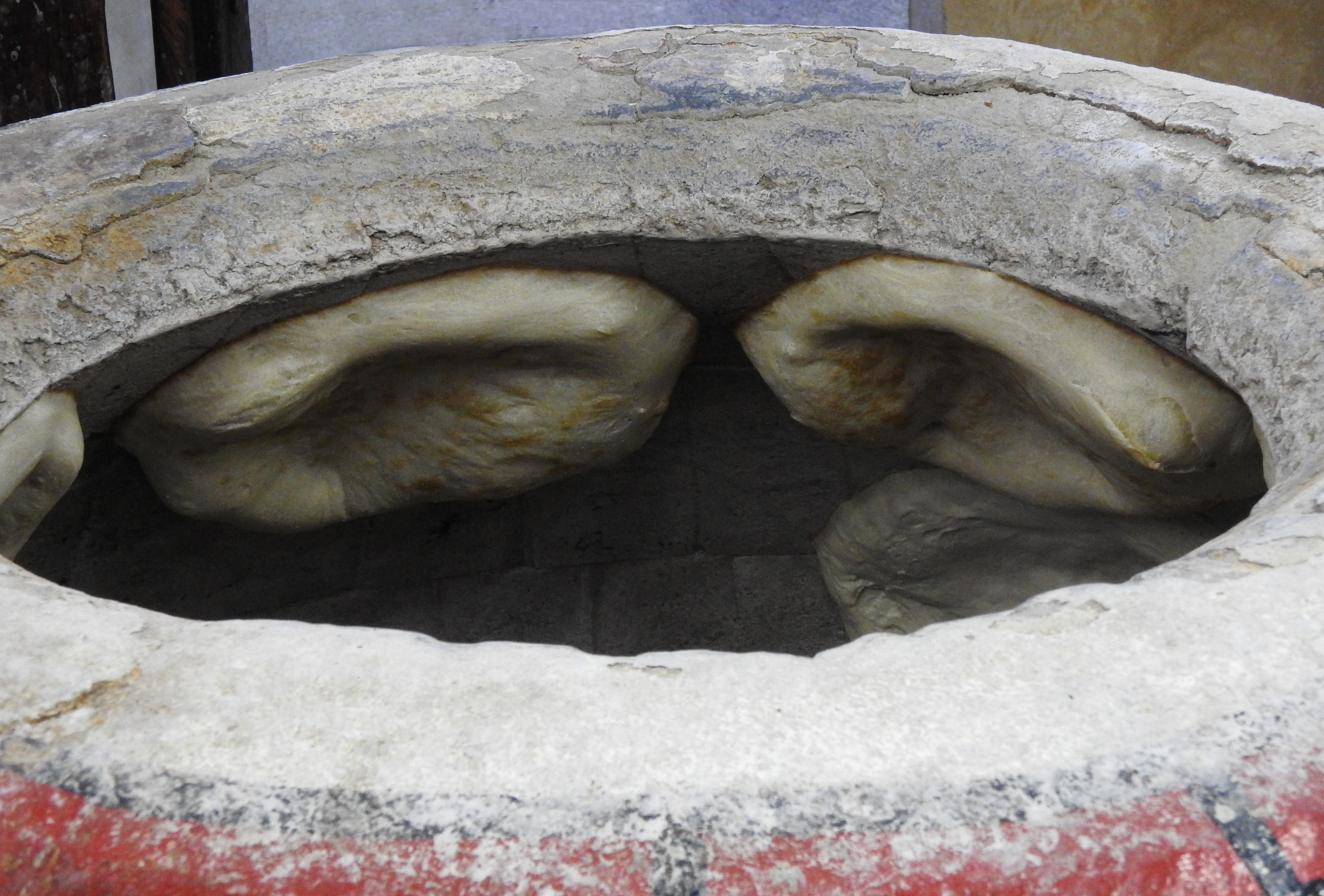
Tonri hats

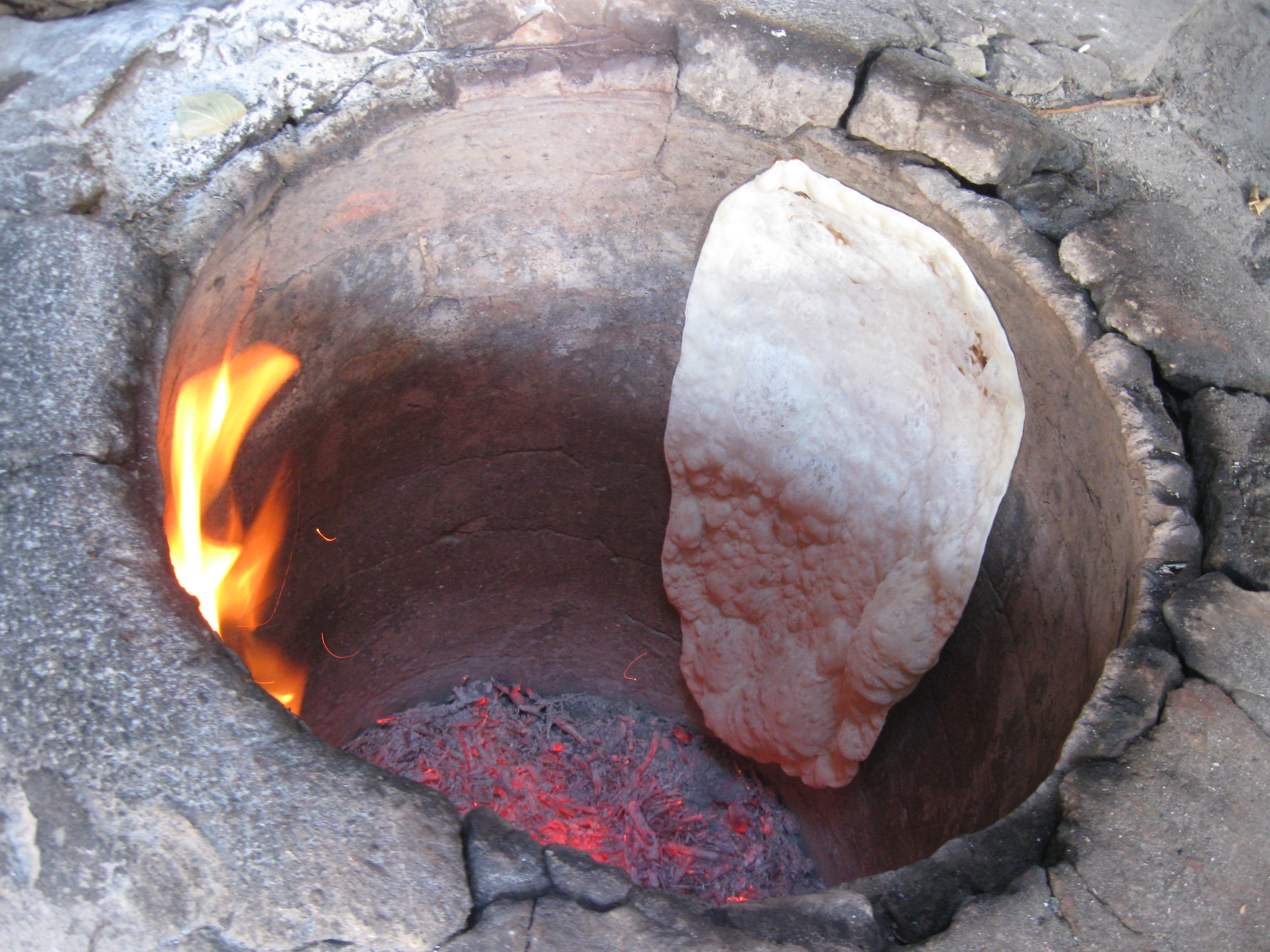
Lavash flatbread

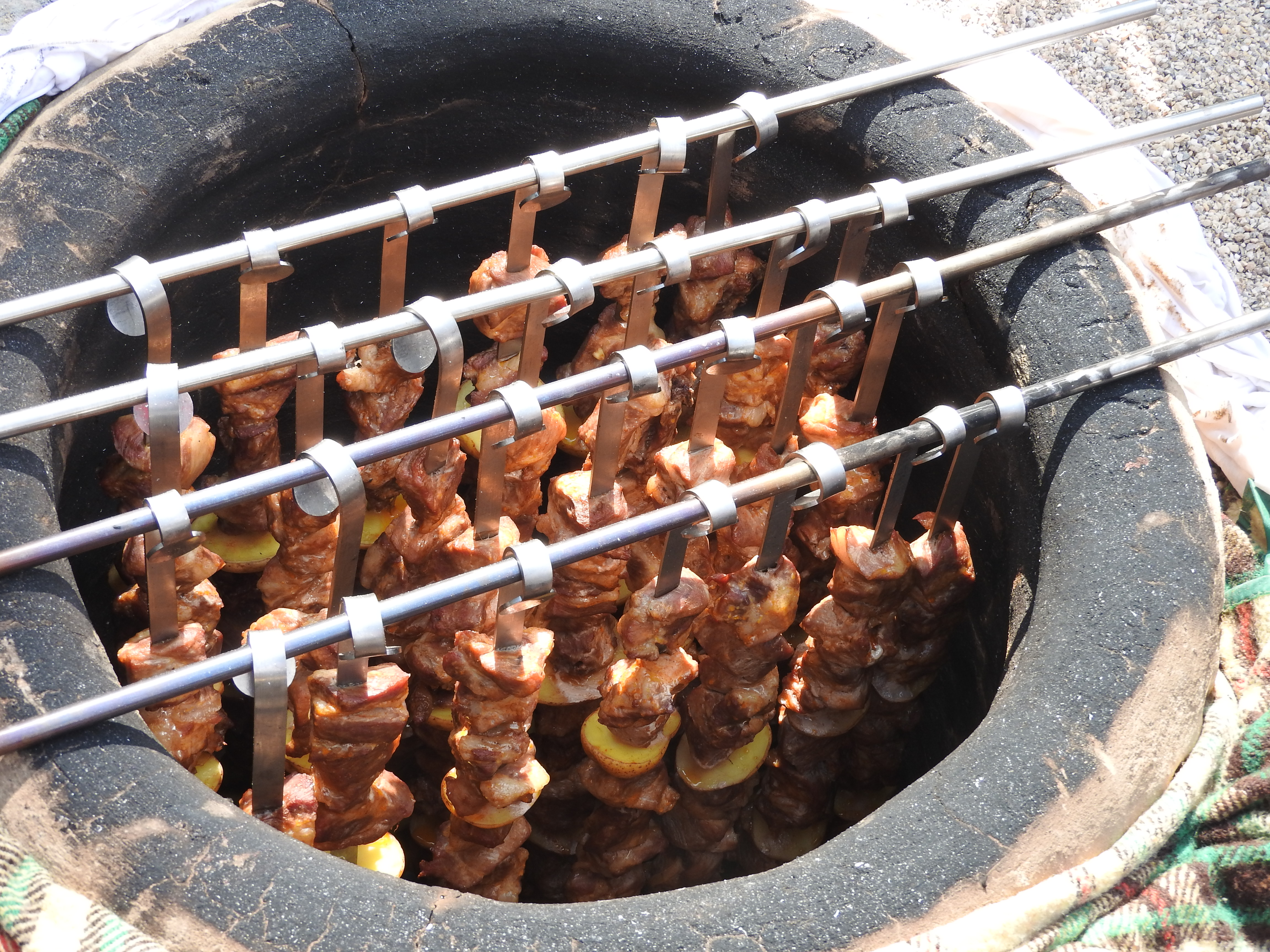
Khorovats skewers

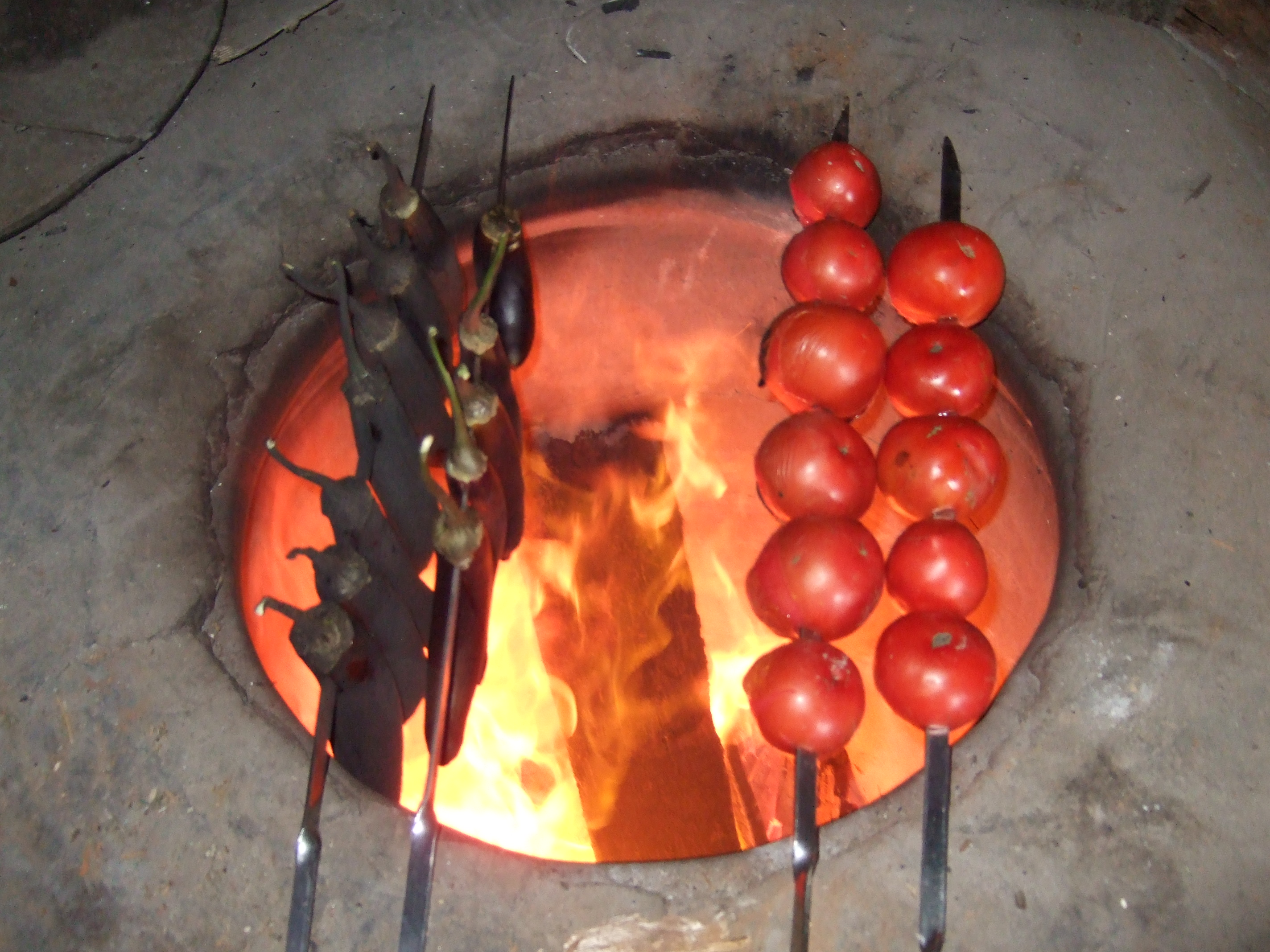
Grilled vegetables

==== Turkmen tamdyr ====
The baking of a traditional, white bread called çörek in Turkmen is a medieval practice in Turkmenistan, using a clay tamdyr oven.

Most Turkmen families living in the rural area have tamdyrs in their households. Occasionally, housewives get together and bake çörek for several families. One of the most famous kinds of çörek baked in the Turkmen tamdyr is etli çörek (bread with meat), made during holidays in Turkmenistan. Turkmens bake not only bread in the tamdyr but also several dishes, the most famous of which is somsa, a folded pie like a samosa or pasty with a filling, usually beef. Various spices can be added to the Turkmen bread: cumin, cinnamon, olives, mustard seeds, sunflower seeds, and other flavoring ingredients. To prepare the tamdyr for baking; first the fire is made directly inside the tamdyr, usually using dried cotton stalks. The bread maker then watches the color of the tamdyr's inner walls. When they turn white, the ashes are shoveled into the center of the oven, and the lower ash-pit is closed. The bread must be thrown into the oven carefully but deftly so that it does not lose shape and neatly sticks to the wall.

Baking in the Turkmen tamdyr

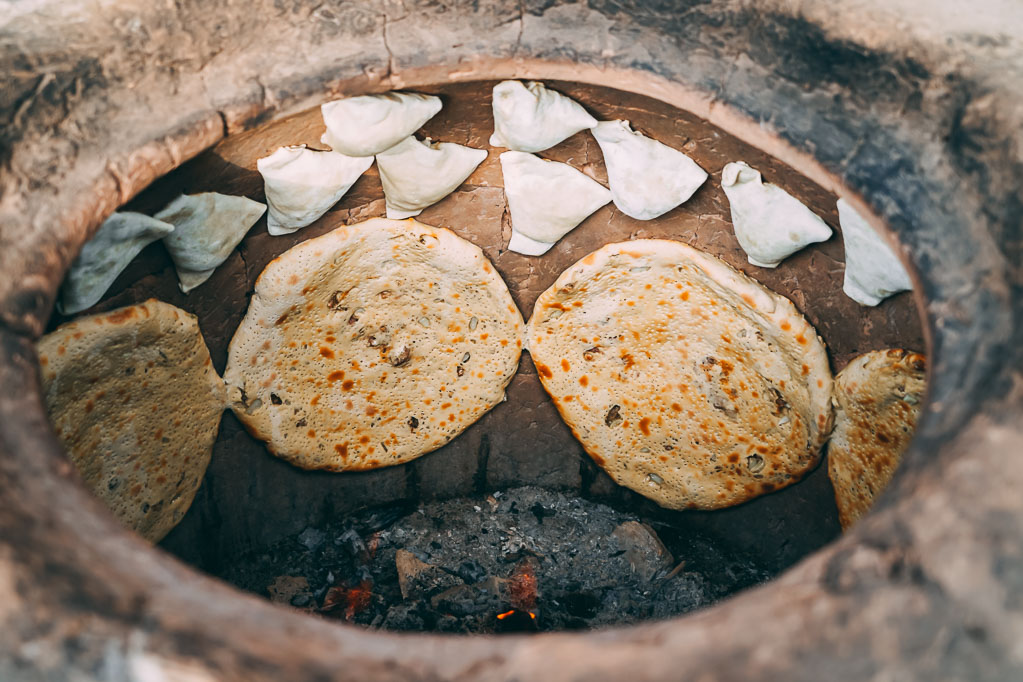
Baking çörek and somsa

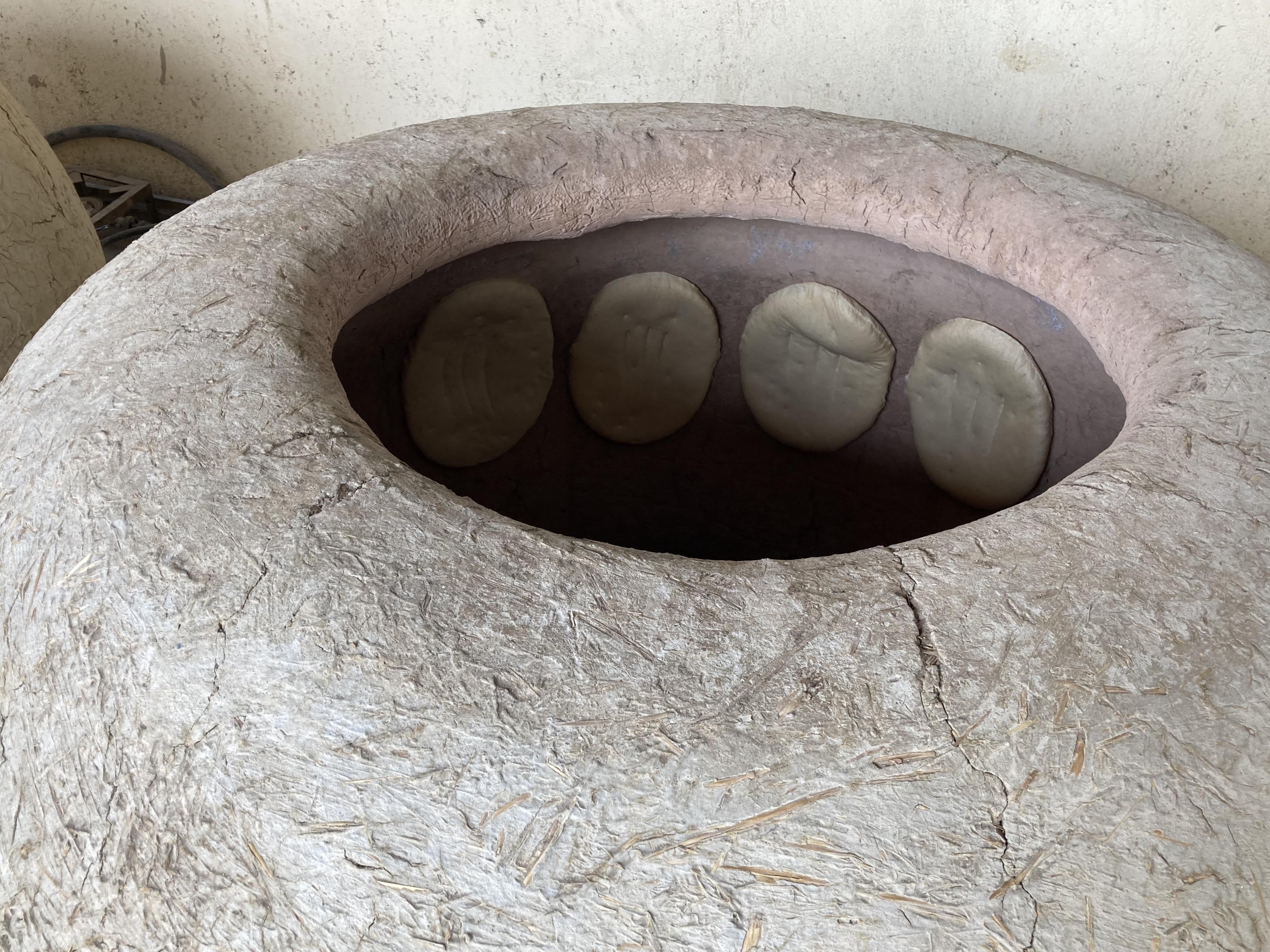
Baking çörek in a Turkmen tamdyr

==== Punjabi tandoor ====
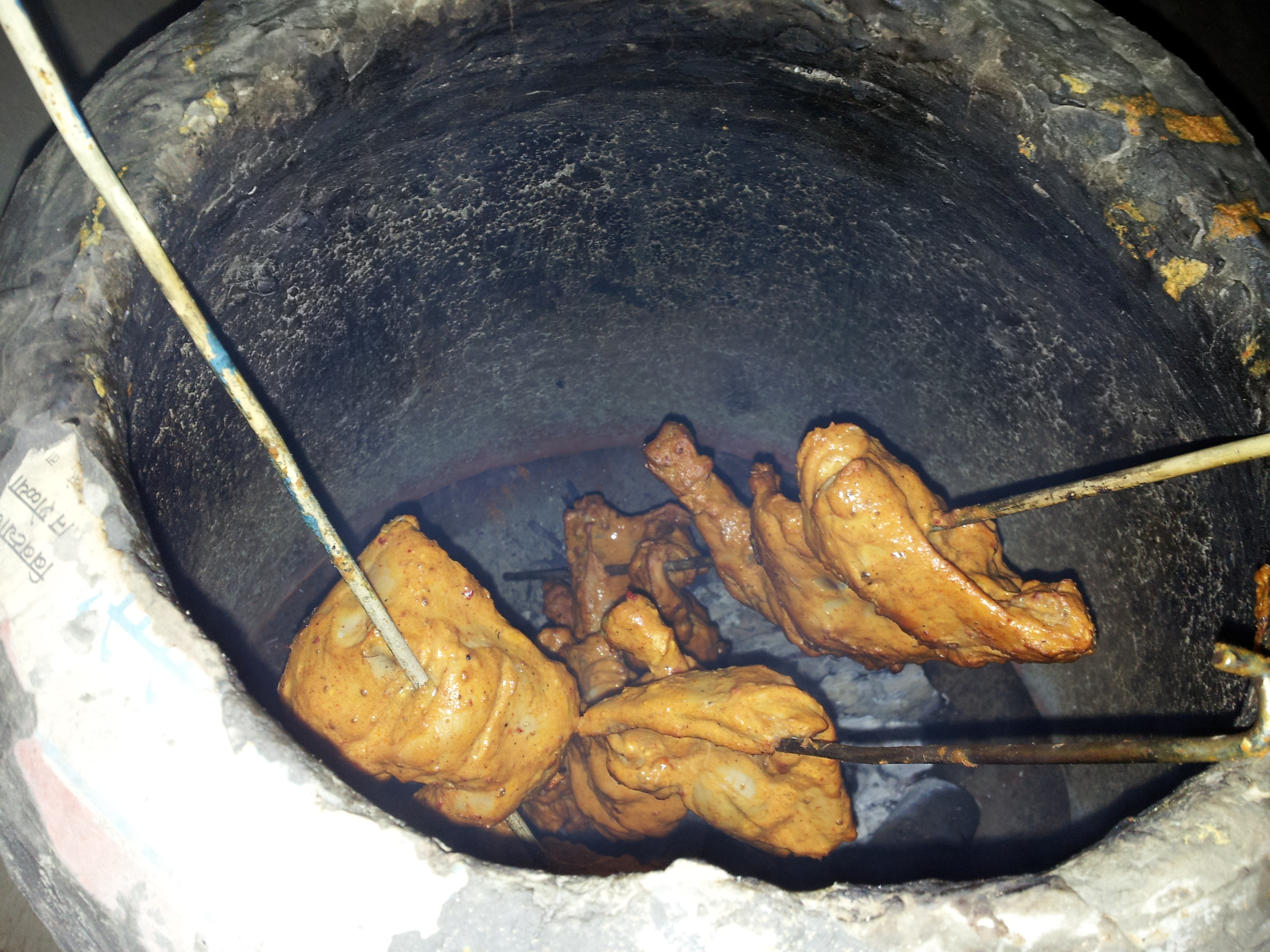
Tandoori chicken cooked inside a tandoor

The Punjabi tandoor from South Asia is traditionally made of clay and is a bell-shaped oven, which can either be set into the earth or rest above the ground and is fired with wood or charcoal, reaching temperatures of about 480 °C (900 °F; 750 K). Tandoor cooking is a traditional aspect of Punjabi cuisine in undivided Punjab.

In India and Pakistan, tandoori cooking was traditionally associated with the Punjab, as Punjabis embraced the tandoor on a regional level, and became popular in the mainstream after the 1947 partition when Punjabi Sikhs and Hindus resettled in places such as Delhi. In rural Punjab, it was common to have communal tandoors. Some villages still have a communal tandoor, a common sight before 1947.

==== Azerbaijani tandir ====
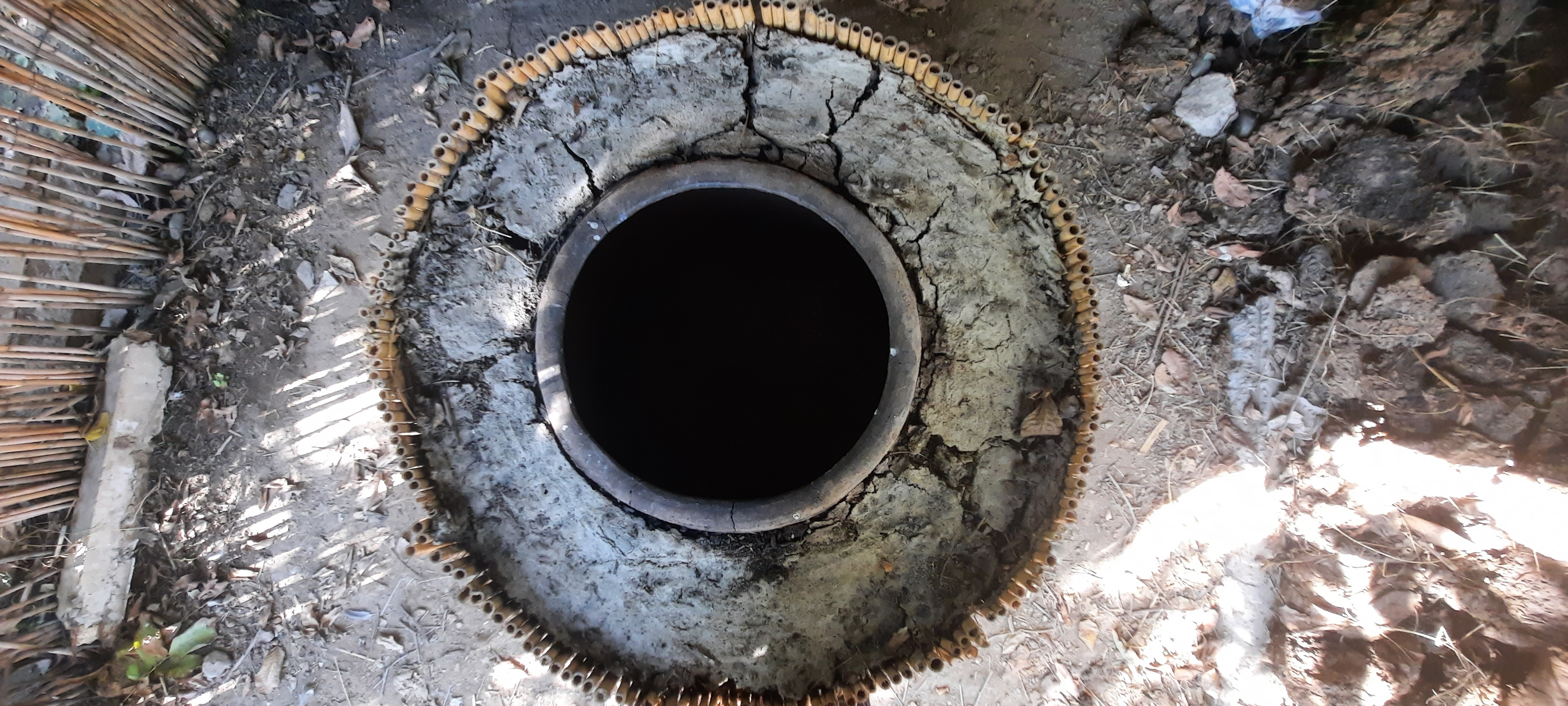
Azerbaijani tandir

In medieval times, the people that used to live where Azerbaijan is situated today (lezgins, Tat Iranians and later Turks) used to cook bread and other dishes inside the tandir.

Tandir bread (təndir çörəyi) is a widespread bread type in Azerbaijan. Tandir bread is baked from the heat of the tandir's walls, which ensures very fast baking.

One of the world's biggest tandoors was built in Azerbaijan's southern city of Astara in 2015. The height of the tandoor is 6.5 m (21 feet) and the diameter is 12 m (39 feet). The tandoor consists of 3 parts.

==== Georgian tone ====
The outside of the Georgian tone is made of a mixture of clay and quartz sand which is wrapped in linen and eventually hardens into a hard fireproof surface. Georgian bakers stick bread to the interior walls of the tone to let it bake, which is lined with fireproof bricks.

== Dishes ==
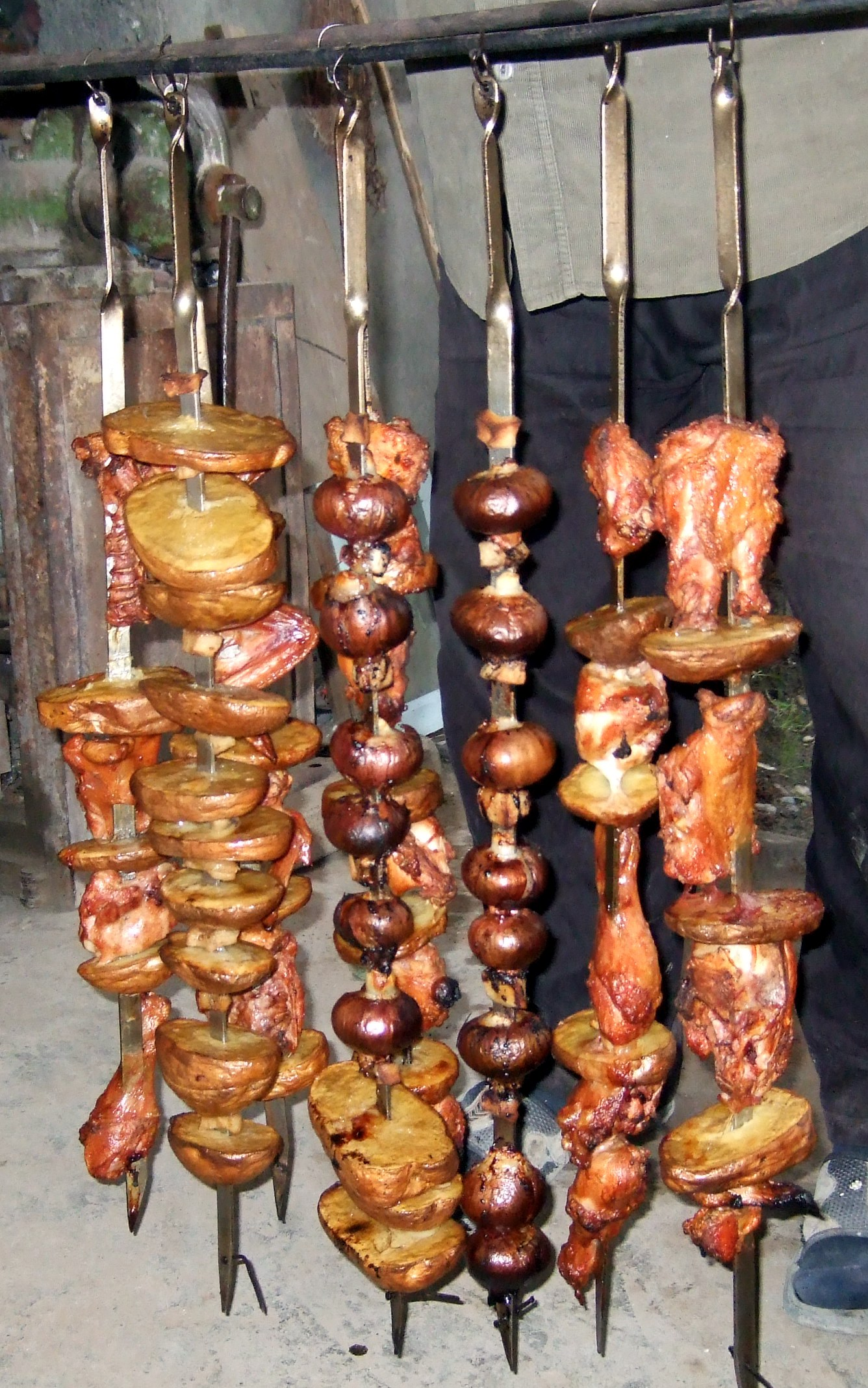
Chicken khorovats, onions and potato slices with pork fat, roasted in an Armenian tonir

A tandoor may be used to bake many types of flatbread. Some of the most common are lavash, tandoori roti, tandoori naan, tandoori laccha paratha, missi roti, laffa, and tandoori kulcha. Armenian dishes prepared using a tonir are varied. There are bread dishes like tonri hats, matnakash and a sweet filled bread named gata, while there also are meat dishes like khorovats, khashlama, the meat of khash and fish like sevan trout, as well as vegetables that are cooked using a tonir.

Tandoori chicken is a roasted chicken delicacy that originated in Punjab region of South Asia. The chicken is marinated in yogurt seasoned with garam masala, garlic, ginger, cumin, cayenne pepper, and other spices depending on the recipe. In hot versions of the dish, cayenne, red chili powder, or other spices give the typical red color; in milder versions, food coloring is used.

Chicken tikka is a dish that originated in the Punjab region. It is made by grilling small pieces of boneless chicken which have been marinateed in spices and yogurt. It is traditionally cooked on skewers in a tandoor and is usually boneless. It is used in preparing the British curry chicken tikka masala.

A samosa is a fried or baked pastry shell with a savory filling, which may include spiced potatoes and vegetables, or ground lamb or chicken. In Central Asia, samosas are typically baked in a tandoor, while they are usually fried elsewhere.

== See also ==
- Kamado – Traditional Japanese cook stove
- List of cooking appliances
- Masonry oven – Baking chamber made of fireproof brick, concrete, or stone
- Primitive clay oven – Primitive baking ovens
- Tabun oven – One of several styles of clay ovens used in the Middle East
