= Akhtala =

City in Lori, Armenia

Akhtala Ախթալա
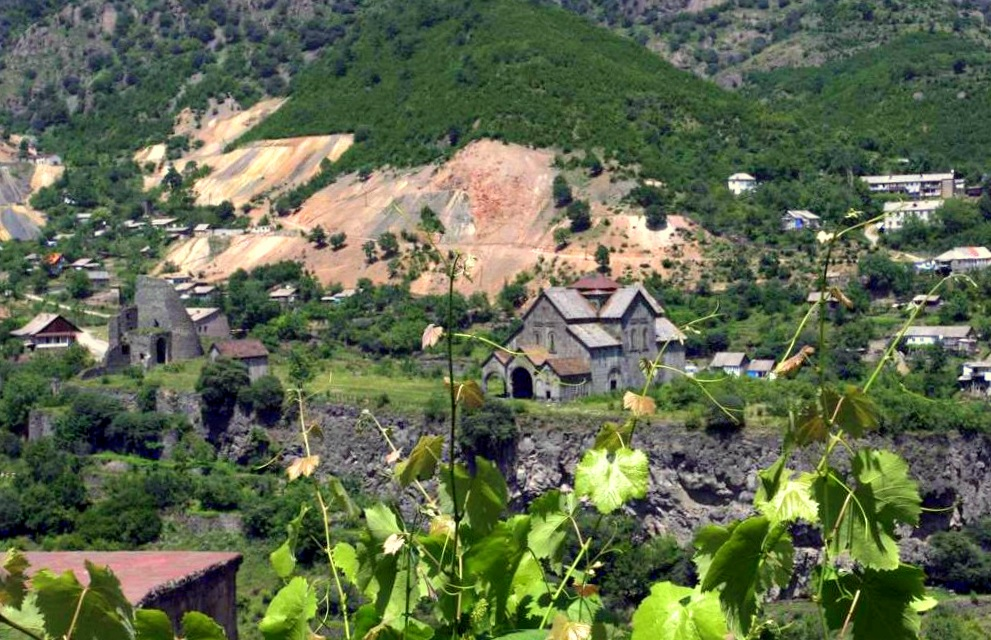
- Akhtala with the monastery and fortress

- Location within Armenia
- Coordinates: 41°08′00″N 44°46′00″E
- Country: Armenia
- Province: Lori
- Municipality: Akhtala
- Established: 10th century

Government
  - Mayor: Haykaz Khachikian

Area
  - Total: 4.3 km^{2} (1.7 sq mi)
- Elevation: 740 m (2,430 ft)

Population (2022 census)
  - Total: 2,360
  - Density: 550/km^{2} (1,400/sq mi)
- Time zone: UTC+4 (AMT)
- Website: Official website

Akhtala (Armenian: Ախթալա), is a town and municipal community in the Lori Province of Armenia, located along the Shamlugh river, on the slopes of Lalvar mountain, at a distance of 186 km (116 mi) north of the capital Yerevan and 62 km (39 mi) north of provincial centre Vanadzor.

As per the 2011 census, Akhtala had a population of 2,092. Based on the 2016 official estimate, Akhtala's current population is around 1,300. As per the 2022 census, Akhtala had a population of 2,360.

== Etymology ==
The modern name of Akhtala was first recorded in a royal decree of 1438. The etymology of the name Akhtala is believed to be of Turkic origin, meaning white glade. The original Armenian name of the settlement where the monastery is built is Pghindzahank (Armenian: Պղնձահանք), literally meaning copper mine.

== History ==
Archeological excavations showed that the area of Akhtala has been occupied by human since the early Bronze Age. During the 1887-89 excavations conducted by French archaeologist Jacques de Morgan, the site of a historical cemetery was unveiled with some bronze and iron objects, weapons, and ornaments dating back to the 8th century BC. The ancient settlement of Akhtala is situated on the same territory of the present-day mining area of Akhtala. It is associated with the Dzobopor canton of ancient Gugark; the 13th province of the historic Greater Armenia. The settlement of modern-day Akhtala was known as Agarak during the 5th century.

The partially-ruined Akhtala Fortress was built on top of Bronze and Iron Age foundations, in the late 10th century by the Kyurikids, a branch of the Bagratunis originated from Gurgen (pronounced Kyurikeh in the local dialect of Gugark). He was the son of the patrons of Sanahin and Haghpat monasteries located not far from Akhtala, King Ashot III the Merciful and Queen Khosrovanush. Gurgen's brothers were King Smbat II the Conqueror and Gagik I Bagratuni, under whom the Bagratuni Kingdom of Armenia reached the peak of its prosperity.

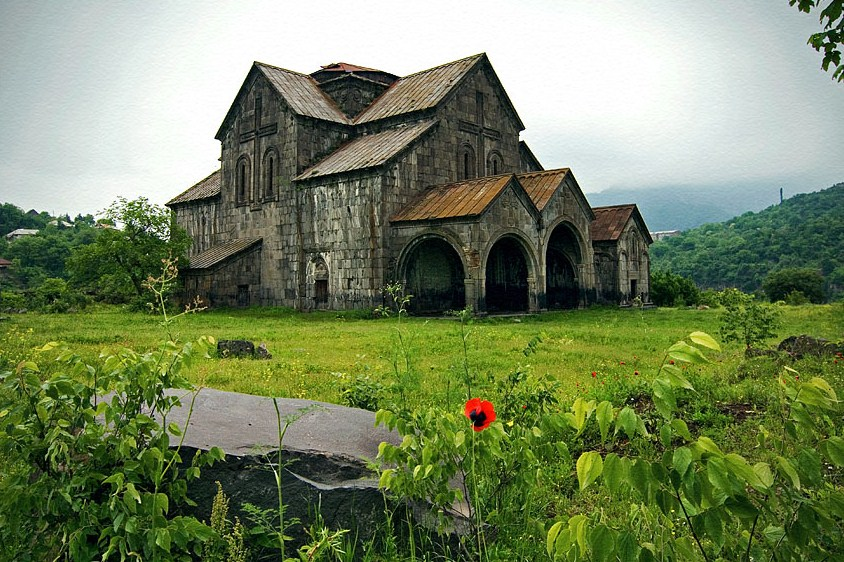
Akhtala Monastery of the 10th century

The Bagratuni King Smbat II of Armenia founded the Kingdom of Tashir-Dzoraget in Gugark for strategic reasons and enthroned his brother Kiurike I in 979. Gurgen along with his brother Smbat are depicted on the sculptures of the patrons in both Sanahin and Haghpat. When the Tashir-Dzoraget kingdom fell in 1118 as a result of the Seljuk raids, the Kyurikids migrated to Tavush and Matsnaberd, yet they maintained ties with their ancestral fortress and compound in Akhtala.

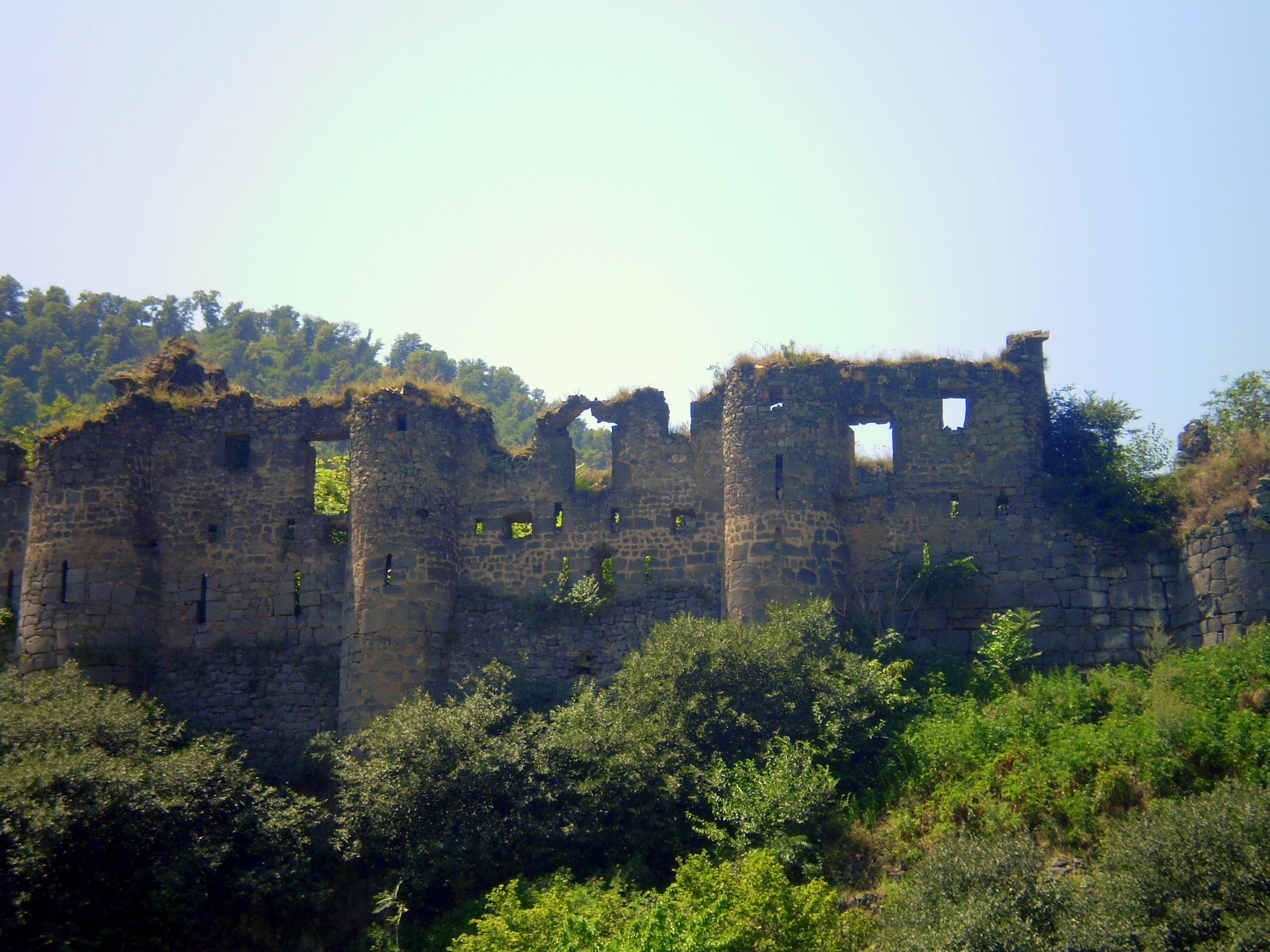
The eastern wall of Akhtala Fortress, dating back to the 10th century

In 1118–1122, the Georgian king David the Builder conquered Lori and granted the region's rule to the Georgian-Armenian Orbelian dynasty. The Orbelians revolted unsuccessfully in 1177, after which a Kipchak named K'ubasari was appointed spasalari of Lori. Later in 1185, Lori became ruled by the Mkhargrdzeli family after Queen Tamar of Georgia appointed the Zakarid prince Sarkis as its governor.

With its unique architectural style, the impressive Akhtala Monastery was reconstructed during the 13th century by prince Ivane Mkhargrdzeli. This medieval Christian complex which is located inside the fortress, was one of the important educational centres in the historical province of Gugark.

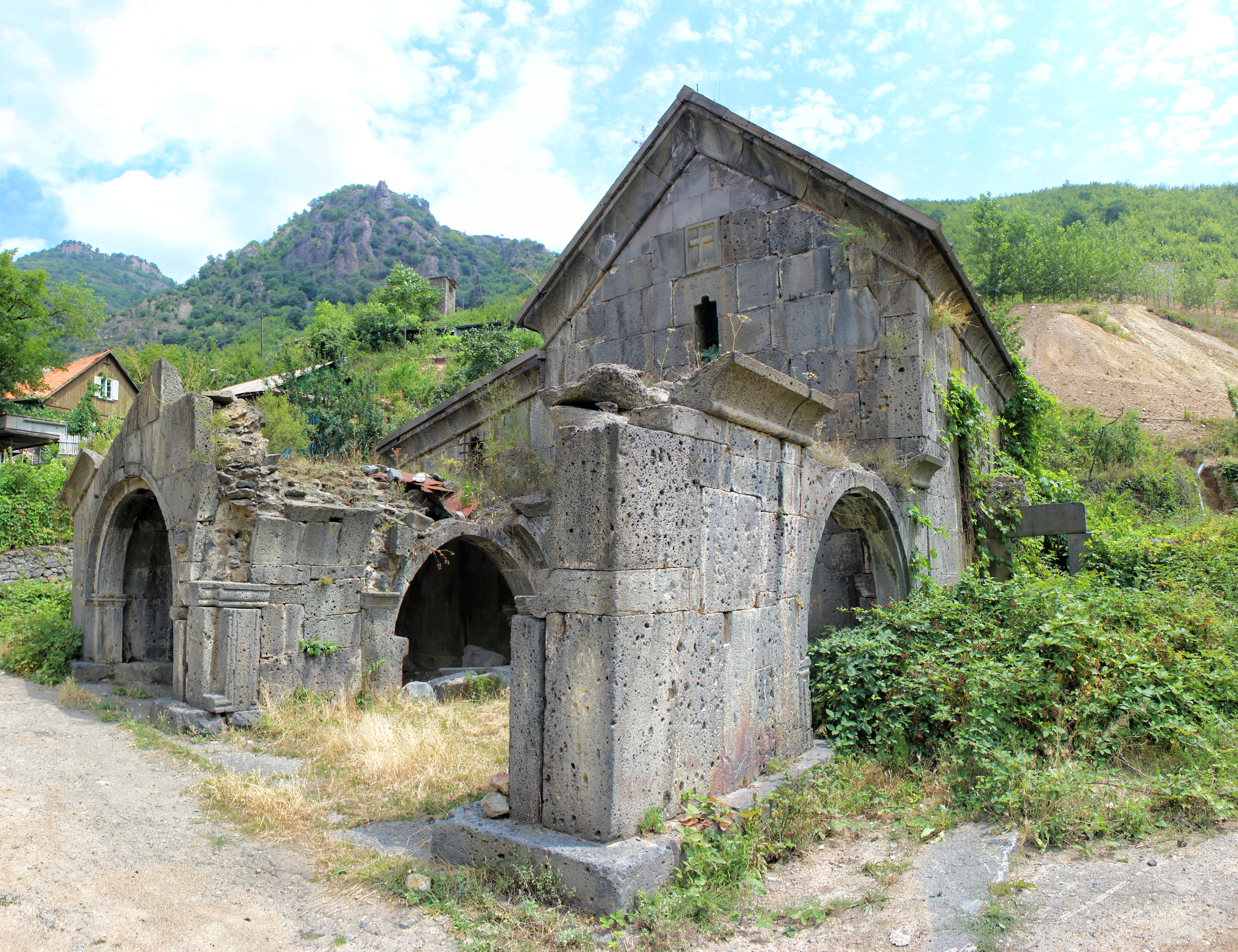
Holy Trinity Monastery, 13th century

However, the region was devastated by the Mongol invasion of 1236, and the Mkhargrdzeli dynasty declined by the 2nd half of the 14th century. After the fall of the Kingdom of Georgia in 1490, Lori -including Akhtala- remained part of Kingdom of Kartli until the 16th century.

As a result of the 1555 Peace of Amasya, Lori was annexed by Safavid Persia to become part of Persia's Kartli-Kakheti province. After Nader Shah's murder in 1747, the Georgian kingdoms of Kartli and Kakheti became independent and united into a single kingdom by 1762.

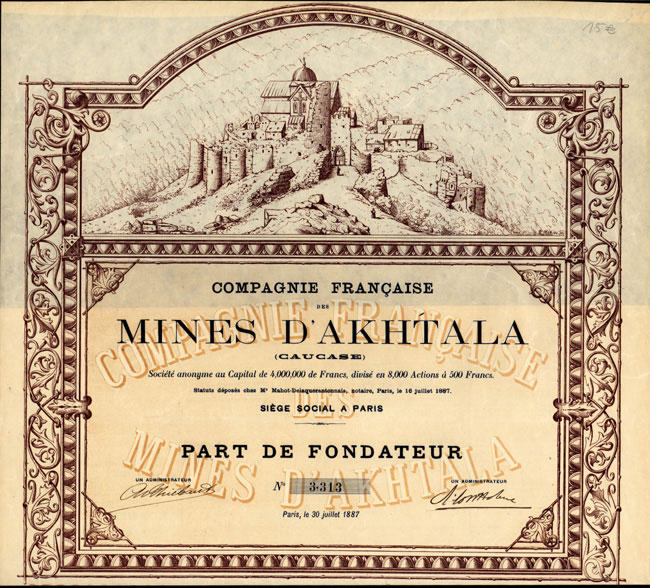
A French bond for the Akhtala mines issued in 1887, depicting the fortress and the monastery

Starting from 1763, Greek experts from Gümüşhane arrived in Akhtala by the request of King Erekle II of Georgia, to utilize the copper and silver mines and establish the copper and silver factory in Akhtala region. Therefore, the village was sometimes called "Pghindzahank" (copper mine) and "Artsatahank" (silver mine).

In 1801, together with the Georgian provinces of Kartli and Kakheti, Lori was annexed by the Russian Empire to become part of the Georgia Governorate. The region became officially part of the Russian Empire at the Treaty of Gulistan signed on 1 January 1813 between Imperial Russia and Qajar Persia. As part of the region of Lori, the village of Akhtala became part of the Borchali uyezd in 1880, within the Tiflis Governorate of the Russian Empire. Between 1887 and 1914, the Akhtala copper mine along with the mine of Shamlugh were exploited by the Compagnie Française des Mines d'Akhtala.

In late 1918, Armenia and Georgia fought a border war over Lori. With the British intervention the Lori "neutral zone" was created including the region of Akhtala, only to be reoccupied by Georgia after the fall of the Armenian Republic at the end of 1920. Following the sovietization of Armenia in December 1920, Lori was incorporated into Soviet Armenia on 11 February 1921.

Akhtala had survived as a village until 1939, when it was given the status of an urban-type settlement within Soviet Armenia, with its 398 inhabitants, within the Alaverdi raion (founded earlier in 1930 and rename Tumanyan raion in 1969). In 1995, the newly adopted administrative divisions law of independent Armenia reaffirmed the status of Akhtala as an urban community within Lori.

== Geography ==
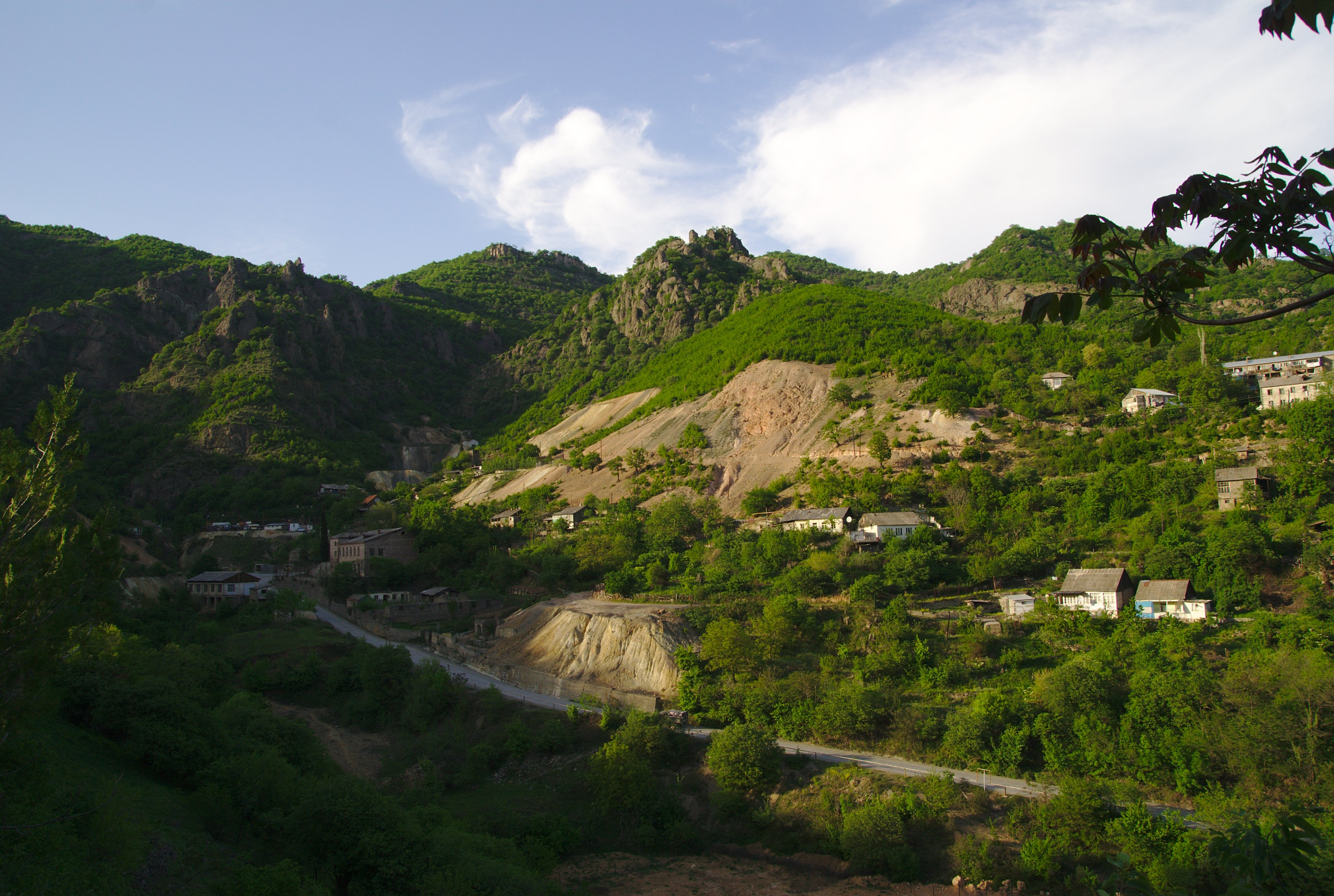
View of Akhtala

Being situated in the valley of Debed river at a height of 740 meters above sea level, Akhtala has a subtropical climate with cool and dry summers and mild winters. Annual precipitation reaches up to 600 mm (24 in).

The area of the present-day Akhtala had been previously known as Nerkin Akhtala. Currently, the town is commonly divided into 3 neighbourhoods:

- the old town located at the northwestern part, comprising the old village of Nerkin Akhtala.
- the new town located at the central and southern parts on a hill between Debed river and its tributary Shamlugh.
- the eastern neighbourhood located on the shores of Debed river, to the east of the old town.

== Demographics ==
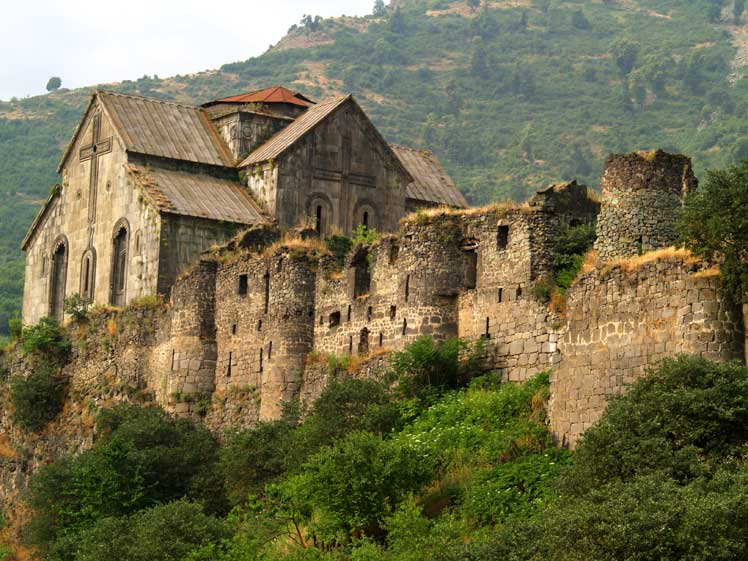
Akhtala Monastery within the fortified walls of the fortress

Historical population
Year	Pop.	±% p.a.
1897	69	—
1926	140	+2.47%
1939	398	+8.37%
1970	4,430	+8.08%
2001	2,435	−1.91%
2011	2,092	−1.51%
2022	2,360	+1.10%

== Culture ==
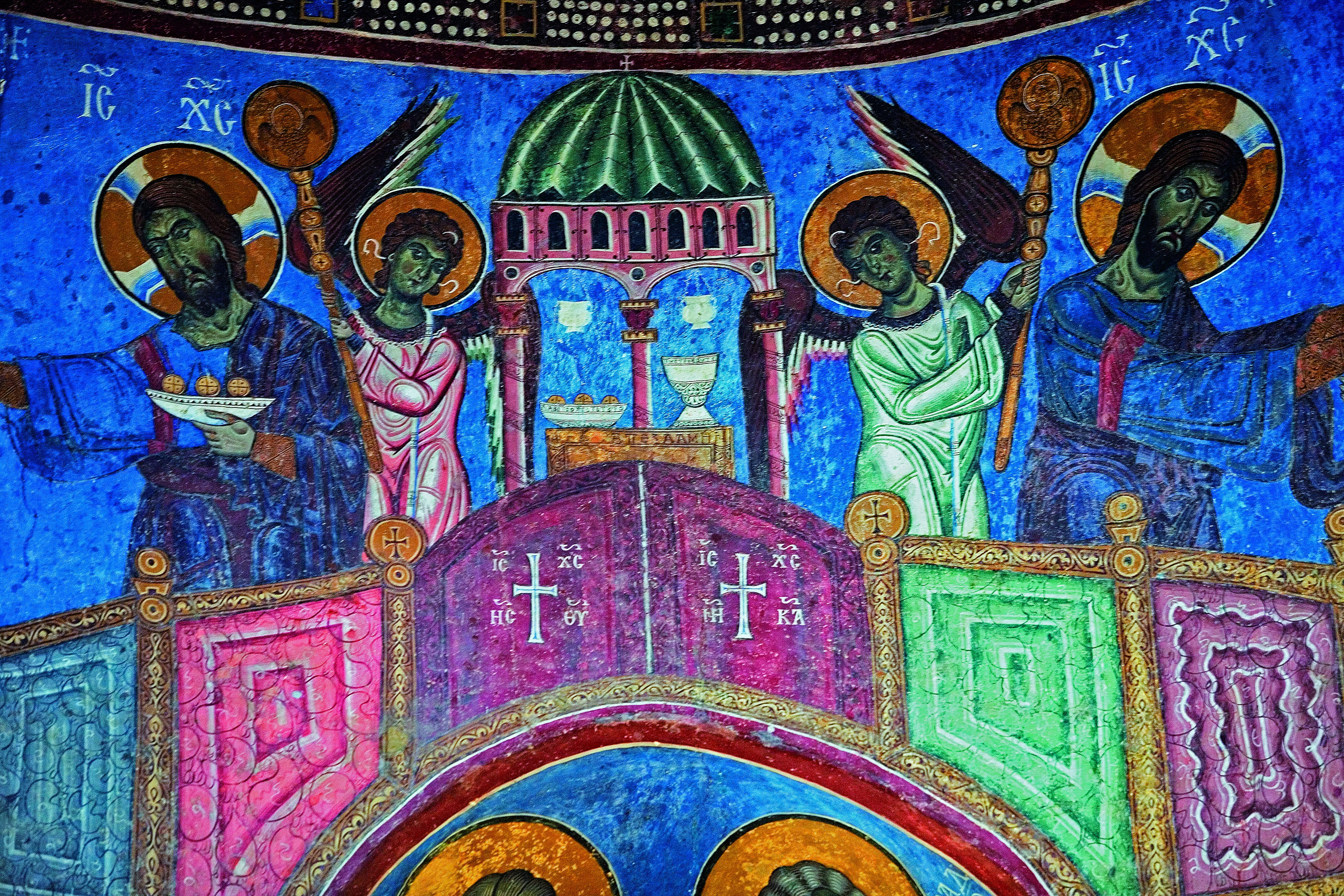
Fresco at the Akhtala Monastery

The 10th-century Akhtala Monastery is among the most well-preserved monasteries in modern Armenia. The main church of the complex is famous for its highly artistic frescoes, which cover the inside walls, the partitions, and the bearings of the building. The nearby Holy Trinity Church dates back to the 13th century, locate around 500 meters northeast of the monastery.

Akhtala has a house of culture and 2 public libraries.

The town is the home of the annual Armenian Barbecue Festival (Armenian: Հայկական Խորովածի Փառատոն Khorovatsi Paraton), since its first edition in 2009. It is annually celebrated on the 3rd Sunday of August. Many types of Armenian kebab, locally known as khorovats is being introduced during the festival. During the 2017 celebration (9th edition), around 1500 kg of meat was grilled during the festival, with around 40 participant cookers.

== Transportation ==
The M-6 Motorway passes through Akhtala from south to east, connecting the town with Vanadzor at the south, and the Georgian border at the north. A network of local roads connect the town with the nearby villages of Lori.

The Akhtala Railway Station was opened during the 1920s. It is 209 km north of Yerevan on the way to Tbilisi.

An abandoned 250-meters long cable car used to connect the eastern neighborhood with the new neighborhood of Akhtala.

== Economy ==
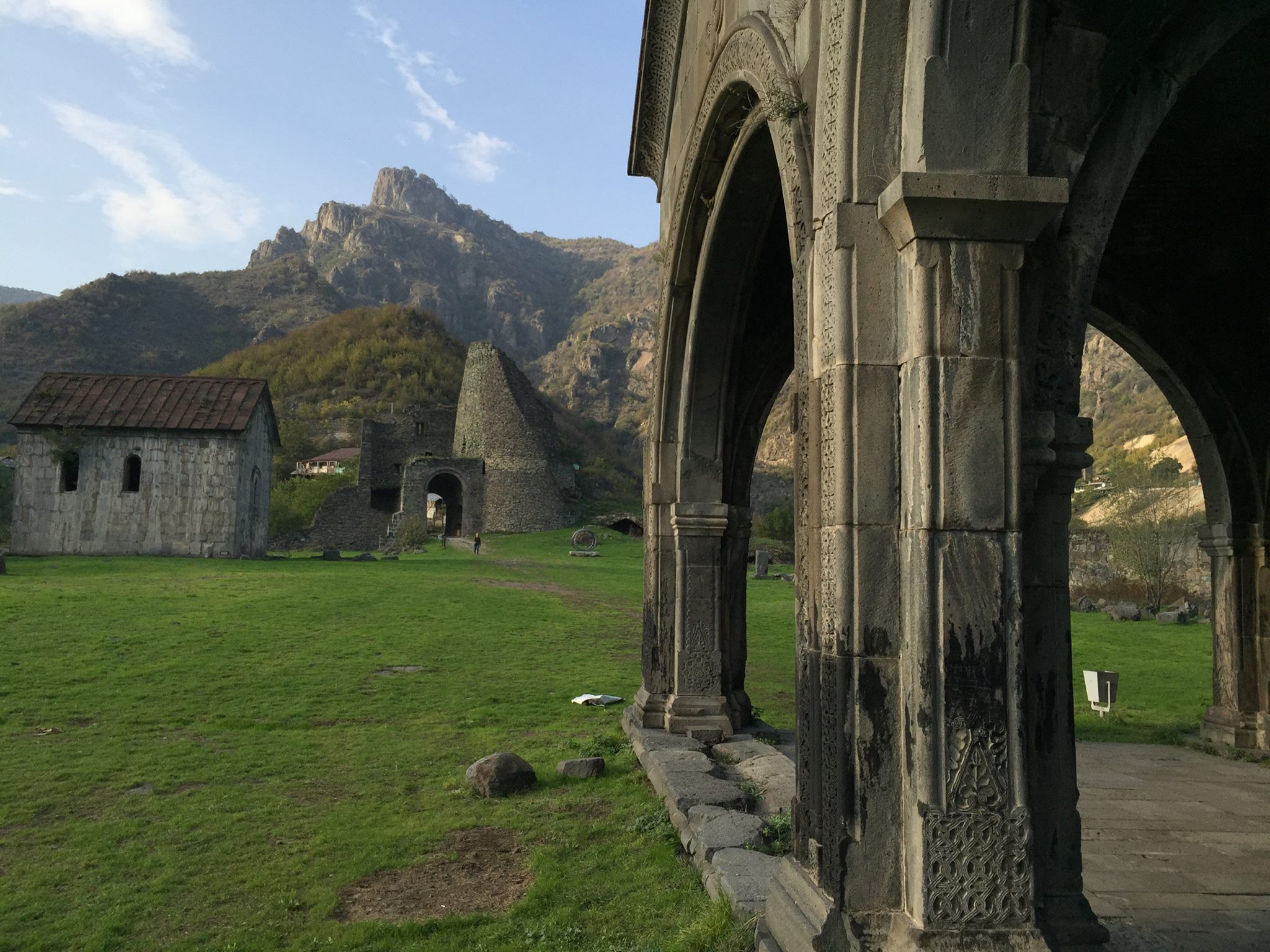
Looking towards the gate of Akhtala Monastery

The area is rich with copper, lead and silver mines which are of industrial importance and are being utilized. The main industrial enterprise of the town is the "Akhtala Mining Plant" which is owned by the "Metal Prince" company. There are small manufacturing establishments in the town for food productions.

The town has a state hospital, a hotel and a sanatorium.

The main problems of the Akhtala are related to the reconstruction of the historical monuments. Environmental issues are also emerging in the small town including air and water pollution.

== Education ==
As of 2017, Akhtala is home to 2 public education schools, as well as pre-school kindergarten.

== Sport ==
Football is popular in Akhtala. FC Akhtala represented the town in domestic competition until its dissolution in 1992. The new neighborhood is home to football training field.

Weightlifting, wrestling, volleyball, chess and tennis are among the other popular sports in the town.
