= Lavash =

Baked thin flatbread common in many areas

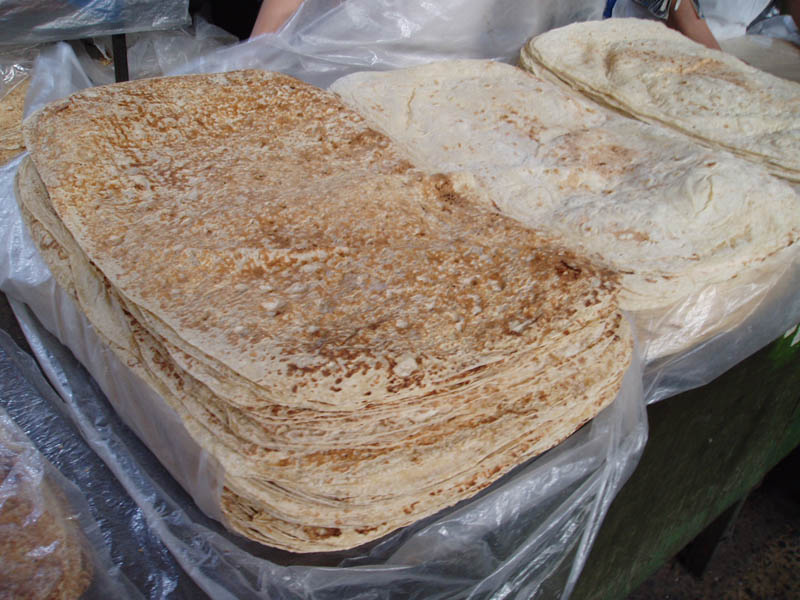
- Type: Flatbread
- Place of origin: Armenia / Iran
- Region or state: West Asia

Lavash is a thin flatbread made of leavened or unleavened wheat dough, baked in a tandoor (a type of clay oven) or on a saj griddle. Some forms are sourdough fermented with dough from previous batches. Lavash cooks very quickly in a tandoor, being placed on the sides using a cushion. It is large and thin, though there are many variations in size and shape. It is soft when fresh but is often dried. Lavash is common to the cuisines of South Caucasus and West Asia. It is a staple food in Armenia, eastern Georgia, and parts of Iran.

Soft lavash can be used for wraps, which use ingredients such as kebabs, barbecued meat, or cheese. It may also be served with dip or with stew to be eaten by hand. Lavash is often prepared in large batches. It lasts months once dried and can be hydrated to restore softness. Dried lavash is sometimes broken up and eaten in dishes such as the Armenian stew khash.

Lavash originated in ancient times, with several countries claiming its origin. In the modern day, lavash is widespread in many parts of Asia between Turkey and Kashmir, and also exists in other regions where it was introduced by Armenian immigrants. It is served at many restaurants, as well as at weddings. In Armenian culture, the preparation of lavash by women is a community event. The UNESCO Intangible Cultural Heritage List inscribed lavash "as an expression of culture in Armenia" in 2014. This was controversial in other countries in the region, and a separate listing regarding the culture of lavash and other flatbreads in Iran, Azerbaijan, Kazakhstan, Kyrgyzstan, and Turkey was inscribed in 2016.

== Etymology ==
The word lavash entered English partly from Armenian (լավաշ, lavaš), Persian (لواش, lavaš), (Note: In Persian, it is also known as nan-e lavash (lit. 'lavash bread').) and Turkish (lavaş). Similar names are used in many Asian languages, including Georgian (lavaš-i), Azerbaijani (lavaş), Tatar (lawaš), Turkmen (lavaš), and Pashto (lawausha). Lavash is the most common name for the bread in American English; the spellings lavosh, lahvosh, lawaash, and lawasha are also used. Other English terms include cracker bread, Armenian cracker bread, mountain bread, and paraki. The Arabic equivalent is called khobiz sajj, or markouk in Lebanon.

The etymology of lavash is unknown. A widely held theory states that the word spread to other languages from Persian. Sevan Nişanyan connects the Persian word for lavash to the Aramaic לושׁ lwš root meaning 'to knead' and recorded al-Faraj ba'd ash-Shiddah from 1451 as the oldest text to use the term in Turkish. Hrach Martirosyan tentatively connects the Armenian word with words derived from Proto-Armenian *law 'flat'.

== Preparation ==
Making lavash in a small restaurant in Yerevan, Armenia

Lavash is made with wheat flour—usually white flour—kneaded with water and salt, forming a stiff dough. High-extraction flour is typically used, at about 80–82% extraction. Leavened and unleavened forms of lavash exist. It may be leavened with yeast or with a sourdough starter known in Armenian as ttkhmor, which consists of dough from the previous batch. Some producers in Iran instead use baking soda, although this is prohibited by the Ministry of Health. A mixture of yeast and baking soda may also be used. The dough of lavash and the similar sangak contain about 83% flour by weight, higher than other breads in Iran. For every 100 g flour, lavash dough may have about 45–55 g water, 2 g salt, 1 g least, and 0.25 g baking soda.

The leavened dough may be fermented for 30–60 minutes, at about 30 °C, before being shaped into 100–300 gram balls, then risen again for 5–20 minutes. The dough is rolled with a rolling pin, commonly a thin rod known as an okhlavoo. Then, it may be rolled with a spiked rolling pin that forms indentations.

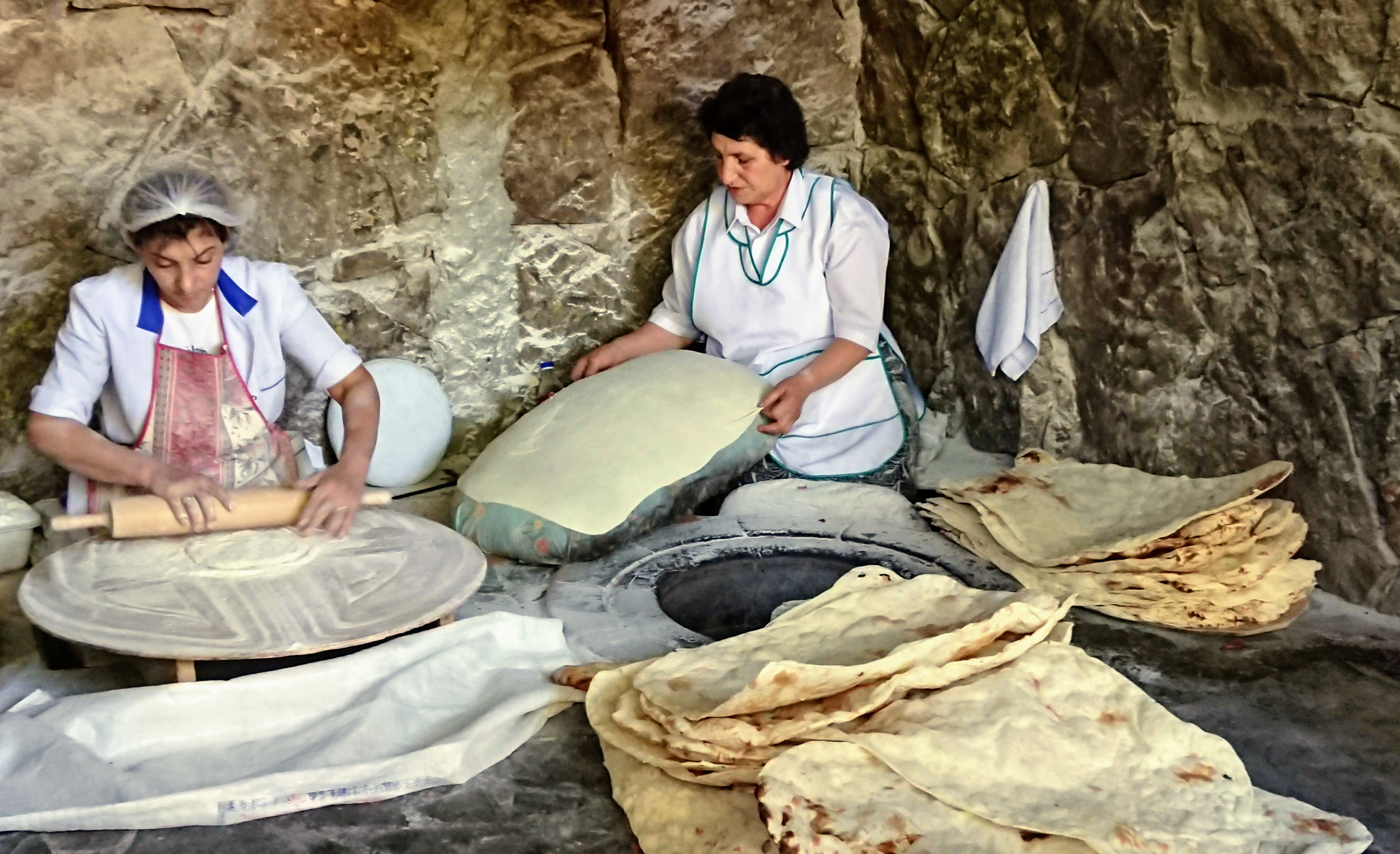
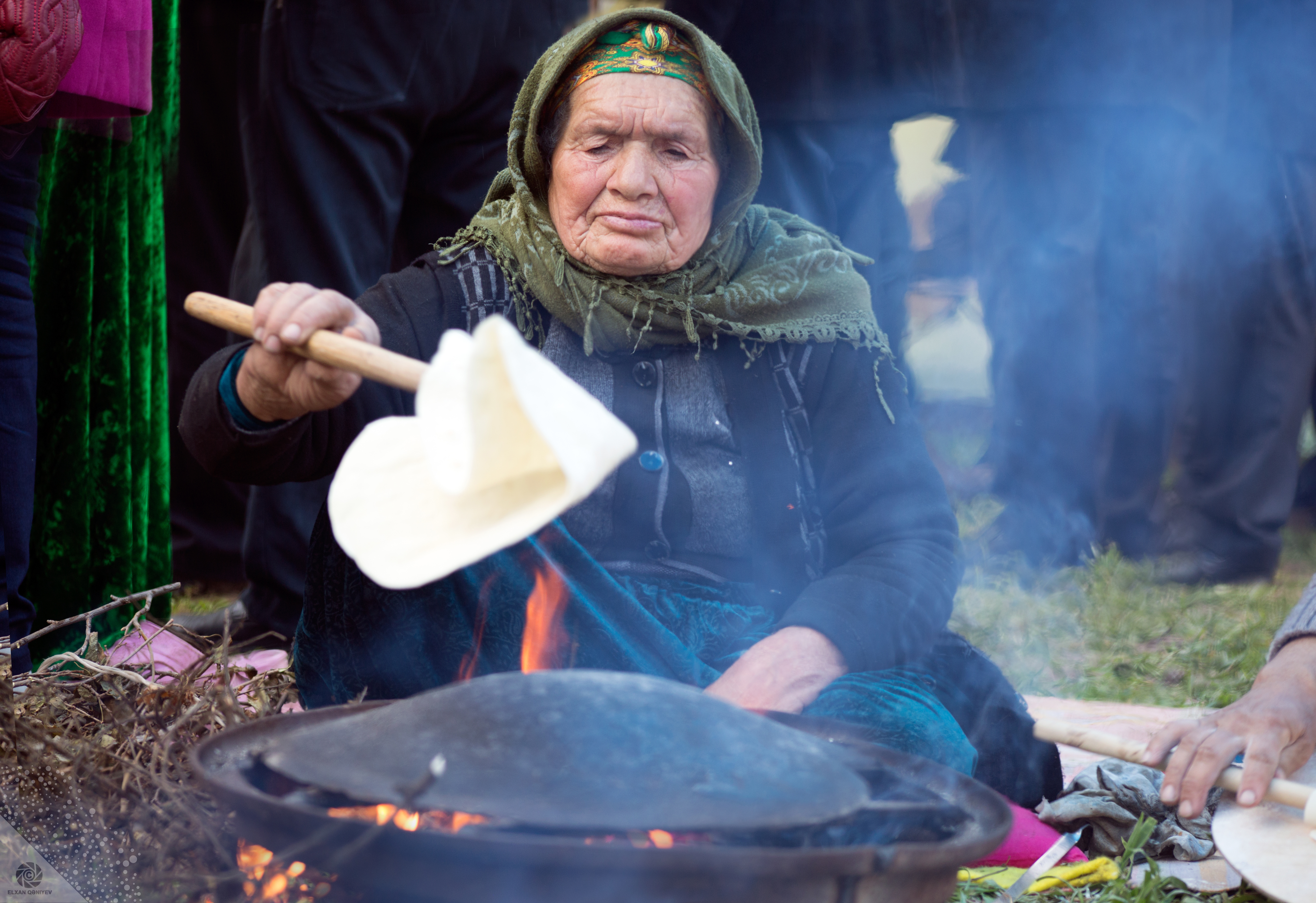
Lavash may be cooked in a tandoor (top) or atop a saj (bottom).

The dough is slapped against the hot walls of a tandoor (also known as tonir or tanoor), a type of clay oven. To place the dough in the oven, it is stretched over a round cushion with a handle, functioning as a peel. This tool is known in Iran as saruj and in Armenia as batat or rabata. Lavash cooks very quickly—about 15 to 40 seconds—due to thermal radiation and convection from the flame and conduction from the wall. The bread is removed using a metal hook and stacked. Aside from a tandoor, lavash may be baked on top of a saj, a metal griddle. This may be placed in or on a wood-powered oven, or over an open fire. In the modern era, electric ovens are commonly used.

Lavash may be produced automatically, using rollers to extrude a continuous sheet of dough, which is die-cut and placed in an oven using a conveyor belt. Lavash bakeries in Iran use a rotary machine with a heating element underneath, but there are also many that use tandoors. Producing 100 kilograms of lavash requires about 4.76 hours. The process to produce one kilogram requires approximately 26 megajoules of energy—mostly from flour production, followed by gas burning—higher than other breads in Iran.

Being cooked on the side of a tandoor causes irregular coloring in lavash, comparable to naan. It bubbles and browns while cooking, and the final product is cream-colored with spots across the surface. The colour of machine-produced lavash is more regular. Lavash is pliable and strong enough to hold other foods.

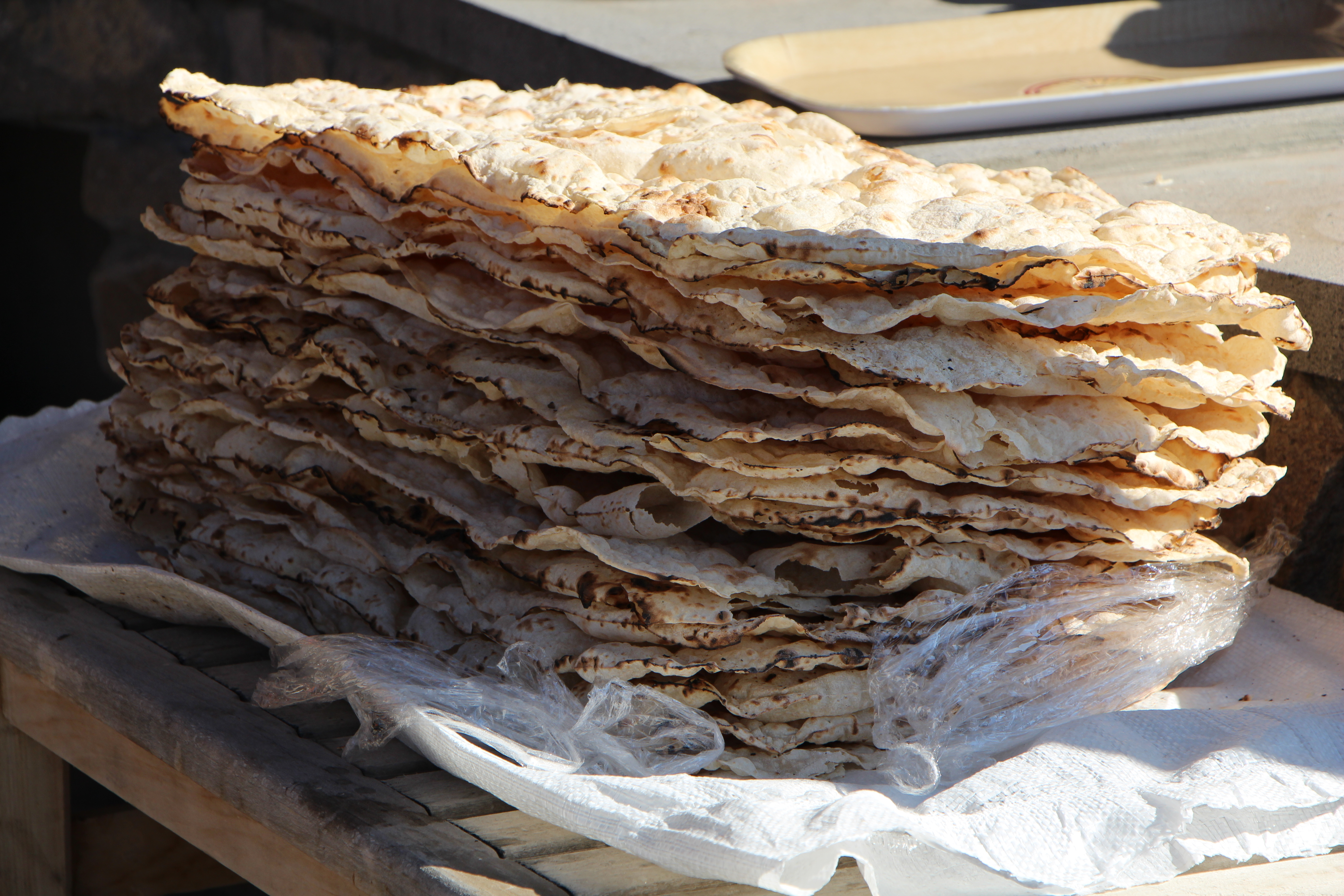
Dried lavash

Lavash is classified as a single-layer flatbread. It is very large and thin, typically with a length of 60–70 cm, a width of 30–40 cm, and a thickness of 2–3 mm. It weighs about 225–250 g. The shape and size widely vary. Some lavash is very thin, enabling it to dry quickly. Lavash in Iran is particularly thin, sometimes slightly translucent. Iranian lavash may be rectangular, circular, or oblong, with a width from 30 cm to over 50 cm. Georgian lavash is distinctly thick and round.

While quite flexible when fresh, lavash dries out quickly and becomes brittle and hard. Hard lavash may have a longer cooking time and be left uncovered. It may be rolled up or placed on a rack to dry. For soft lavash, the bread is removed from heat immediately after the bottom begins to brown, then finished with water and covered with cloth or plastic. Hard and soft lavash may also differ in thickness. The soft form is easier to use when making wrap sandwiches.

== Serving ==
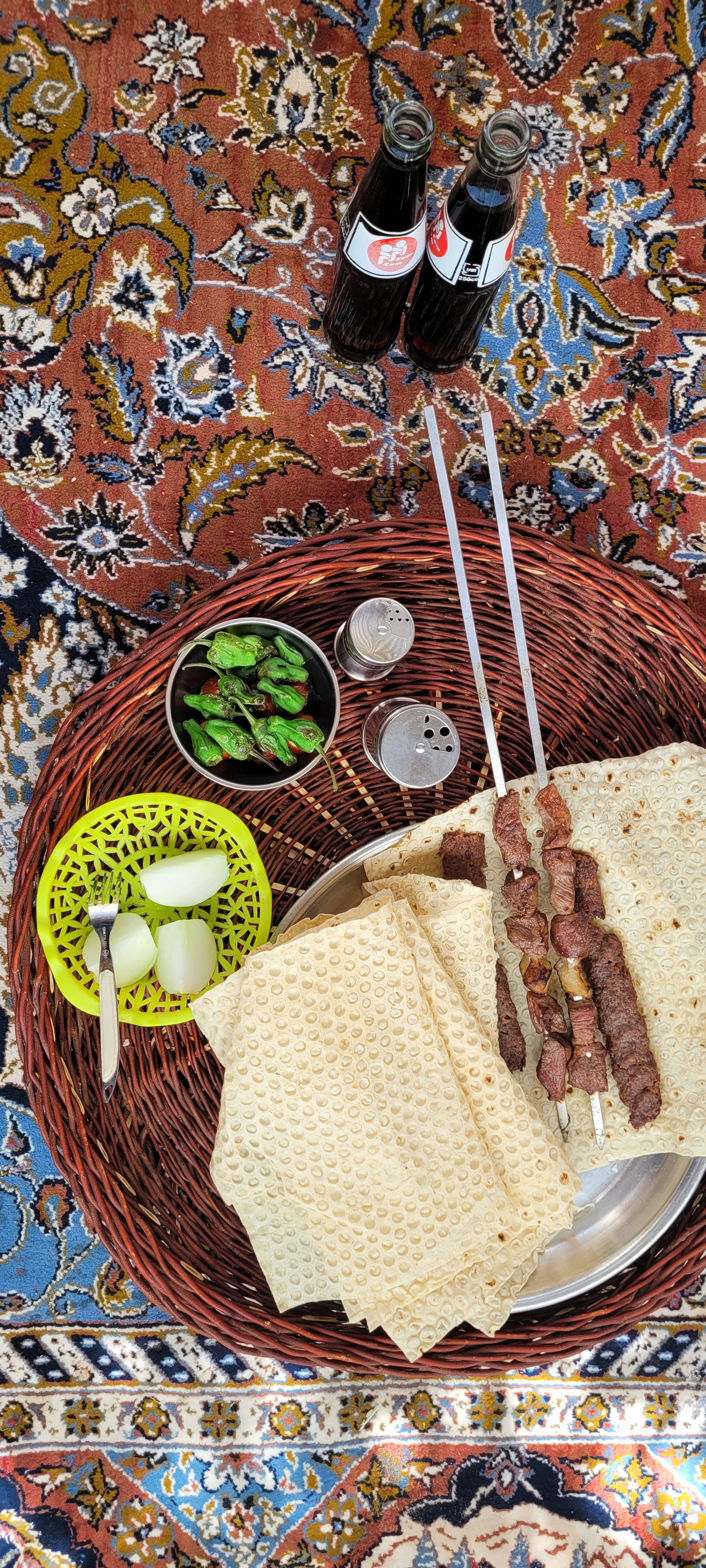
Lavash is used for wraps with toppings such as kebabs.

Lavash is often prepared and stored in large batches. The dryness of lavash makes it very shelf-stable; dried lavash lasts three to six months. It is sprinkled or soaked with water to make it softer again, enabling consumption after 15–20 minutes. In Armenia, it may be eaten as a breakfast with jam and curd, or a snack with cheese. Lavash is similarly eaten for breakfast in Iran.

Lavash is commonly used for wraps, with toppings such as cheese, greens, or meats including kebabs or kofta. In Armenia, lavash is used to wrap the barbecue dish khorovats, which is eaten for lunch or dinner, while tarragon-spiced eggs are wrapped in lavash for breakfast. Lamb or beef is wrapped in lavash to prepare tantuni, a specialty of Mersin, Turkey. In Kashmiri cuisine, a lavash wrap with barbecued meat and chickpeas is known as masala lavasa.

Lavash can be used to wrap around and pick up accompanying dishes, such as stew. This is typical in parts of the Iranian plateau, where it is considered the central part of the meal. It may also be served with dips, such as hummus or muhammara.

In Armenia, the dried bread is broken up for stews such as khash, a hoof meat stew, which is also eaten with soft lavash instead of a spoon. Another preparation in Iran uses hard lavash, mashed with butter to form bite-sized balls. In Turkish cuisine, lavash can be used also for sweet dishes, served alongside Turkish desserts like kaysefe, hasude, pestil kavurması ('braised fruit leather'), ağuz and helva.

== Nutrition and properties ==
Based on various bakery samples from Iran, lavash contains about 61–62% carbohydrates, (Note: Including about 2.4% of dietary fiber and 0.8% sugar) 21%–25% water, 8.7%–8.9% protein, 1–4% ash, and 0.4%–0.8% fat. A 100 g serving contains 291 dietary calories. The glycemic index is about 72, lower than that of breads with higher baking times as there is less time for starch gelatinization.

The sodium content of lavash in Iran is about 1.1%, higher than recommendations, while lavash has a lower sodium content than other breads in Turkey. Lavash is high in iron, with about 3.8 mg per 100 g serving, and low in zinc, with about 0.6 mg per 100 g serving. Yeast in lavash increases breakdown of phytic acid, thus increasing the ability to absorb nutrients. Using baking soda results in worse nutritional value.

According to a study by H. A. Faridi et al, the ideal flour for Iranian breads such as lavash is made from soft wheat containing 9.8% protein. Commercial flour blends designed for lavash in Iran contain, on average, 13% moisture, with the remaining mass consisting of 66% starch, 12.3% protein, 11.0% dry gluten, 6.7% fiber, 1.5% fat, and 0.8% ash. The addition of hydrocolloids may improve shelf life and other physical qualities of lavash; for example, a study by Hamid Tavakolipour and Ahmad Kalbasi-Ashtari found that carboxymethyl cellulose may increase shelf life by 45%. Studies have also found that the addition of whey protein may increase softness, thinness, yellow color, and acceptibility of taste.

== History ==
=== Origin and historical record ===
Lavash has existed since ancient times. Food historian Gil Marks states that lavash originated in the Middle East and traces it to the early innovation of cooking thin flatbreads on terracotta griddles rather than directly on embers. When griddles started to be used, breads had to be made thinner to fully cook through without burning, like the bread rakik described in the Bible. According to Marks, lavash is one of the oldest breads in Persia.

The origin of lavash is attributed to countries including Armenia, Azerbaijan, Georgia, Turkey, and Iran. Russian food writer Stalik Khankishiev argued that it is futile to claim lavash as being from a specific country as it is eaten in a large part of Asia, and stated that the tandoor spread to this region from East Turkestan. Claims of lavash as a uniquely Iranian tradition have existed as far back as the Arsacid dynasty of ancient Persia.

Lavash features in Armenian folklore. One story tells that King Arame of Urartu was captured by Assyrian forces, who would free him if he won an archery competition after ten days without food, but his messenger secretly brought him lavash hidden in his armor, enabling him to win. Lavash is also mentioned by West Asian writers of the Middle Ages, such as Nizami Ganjavi, Mahsati, and Khaqani, as well as in the Book of Dede Korkut.

=== UNESCO Intangible Cultural Heritage listings ===
Lavash, the preparation, meaning and appearance of traditional bread as an expression of culture in Armenia
- UNESCO Intangible Cultural Heritage
- Country: Armenia
- Reference: 00985
- Region: Europe and North America

Inscription history
- Inscription: 2014 (9th session)
- List: Representative

Flatbread making and sharing culture: Lavash, Katyrma, Jupka, Yufka
- UNESCO Intangible Cultural Heritage
- Country: Azerbaijan, Iran, Kazakhstan, Kyrgyzstan, and Turkey
- Reference: 01181

Inscription history
- Inscription: 2016 (11th session)
- List: Representative

The government of Armenia filed for lavash to be included on the UNESCO Intangible Cultural Heritage list in 2013, as announced by the Deputy Minister of Culture, Arev Samuelian. Armenia alone filed the nomination, which described lavash as a "traditional Armenian bread" and described its significance in Armenian culture without mentioning that it is also eaten in the rest of the region. This was opposed by officials from Azerbaijan, Iran, Turkey, and Georgia. Many groups in Iran protested the nomination, including the Ministry of Culture, which stated that the country would file a similar nomination, while state officials including Yonatan Betkolia called for Armenia's nomination to be cancelled. The ninth session of the Intergovernmental Committee for the Safeguarding of the Intangible Cultural Heritage, in 2014, accepted Armenia's original proposal under the name "lavash, the preparation, meaning and appearance of traditional Armenian bread as an expression of culture", facing objections from Azerbaijan's delegation. Turkish media reported on the committee's decision with headlines saying that Armenia had taken the bread from Turkey.

After protests against the listing, the committee changed the name of the listing to "lavash, the preparation, meaning and appearance of traditional bread as an expression of culture in Armenia"—using the phrase "in Armenia" rather than "Armenian". The same title had been proposed by the Azerbaijani delegation. The official listing was published with a note that said:

The Committee … takes note that lavash is shared by communities in the region and beyond, recalls that inscription on the Representative List does not imply exclusivity and encourages the submitting State when implementing safeguarding measures to remain conscious of the element's larger cultural context in the region; [The Committee] recalls the importance of using vocabulary appropriate to the spirit of the Convention and avoiding expressions such as 'unique' and 'original'.

Despite the committee's emphasis on lavash being a cross-cultural tradition, many believed that the specifically Armenian listing downplayed the importance of lavash in other countries. The leader of Armenia's UNESCO delegation, Vahram Kazhoyan, said during a press conference that the country was victorious in the dispute, noting that the nomination had not changed beyond the title, and that Azerbaijan had not influenced the change to the title. At the press conference, historian Suren Hobosyan said he expected an "organized and fierce fight" from Azerbaijan. The Azerbaijani Ministry of Culture released a statement that it had averted an "Armenian provocation", claiming the title change as evidence that lavash was not Armenian, and that Azerbaijan had initiated a meeting of states to file a separate nomination.

Azerbaijan, Iran, Kazakhstan, Kyrgyzstan, and Turkey submitted an Intangible Cultural Heritage nomination titled "flatbread making and sharing culture: Lavash, Katyrma, Jupka, Yufka" in 2015. This focuses on the culture surrounding lavash rather than the product. The listing is one of few with more than four countries, in contrast with the listing made solely by Armenia. It was added to the list in 2016, again with a note about the tradition being "shared by communities in the region and beyond". According sociologist Bahar Aykan, the dispute over lavash was an example of Intangible Cultural Heritage being used to promote culinary nationalism rather than a shared respect for cultural heritage.

== Consumption ==
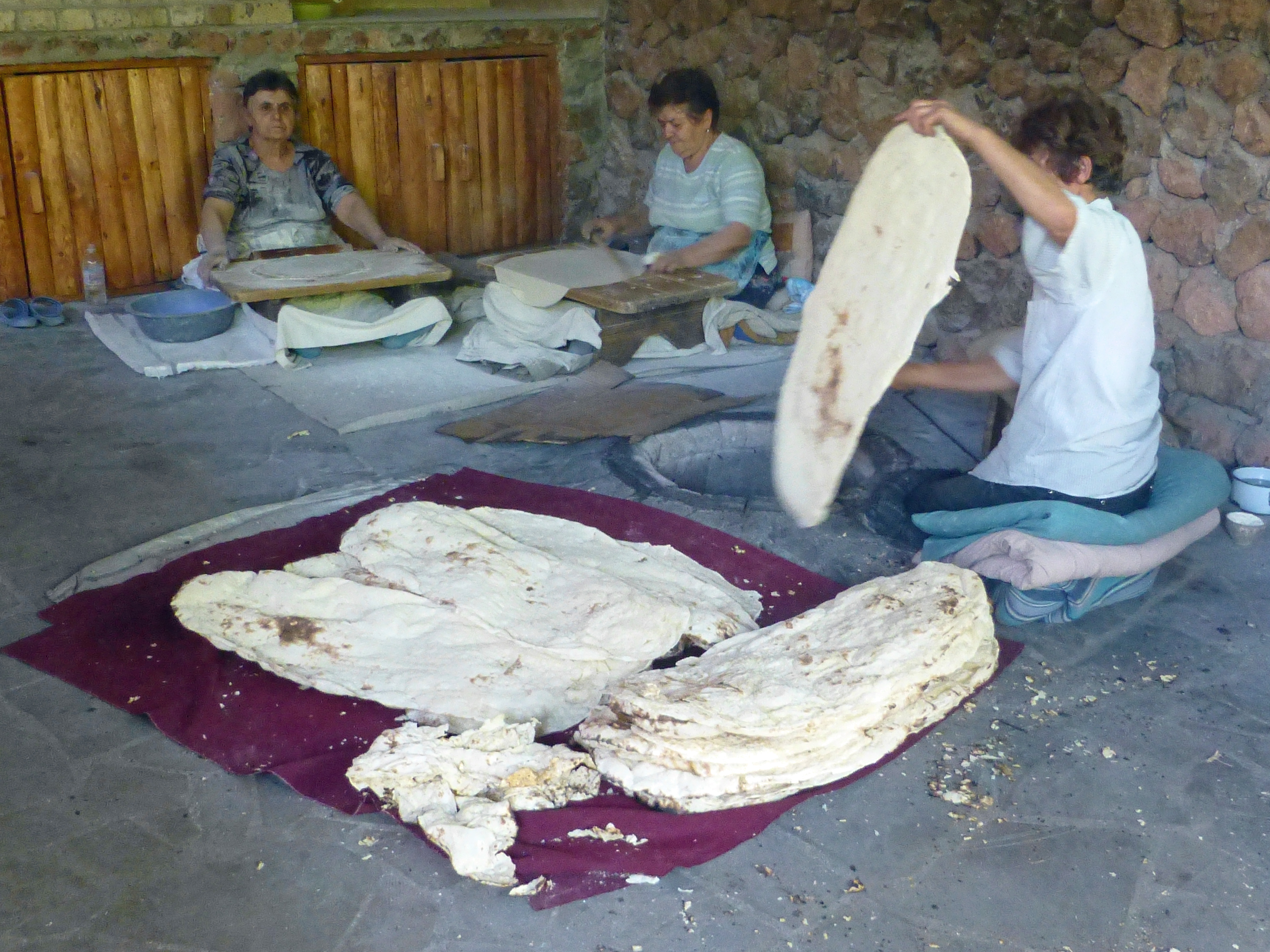
Lavash making in Armenia is a social event for women in a community.

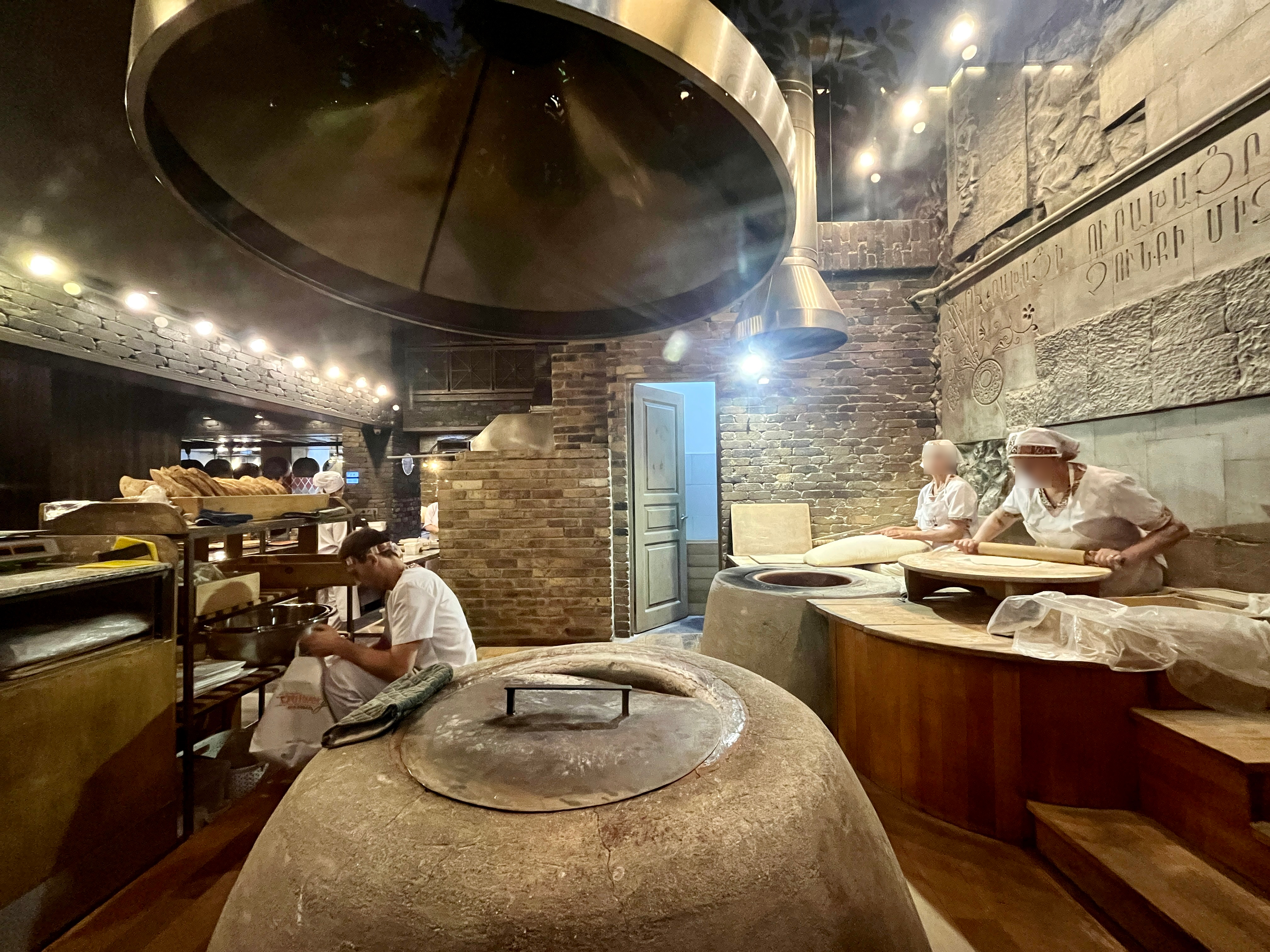
Lavash being prepared at a restaurant

Lavash is widespread across West and Central Asian cuisine, including Southern Caucasian, Afghan, and Iranian cuisines. It is strongly associated with Iranian and Armenian cuisine. The preparation is mostly the same across the region. Lavash wraps are served at cafés and restaurants. Large batches of lavash are carried by nomadic groups due to its convenience. The production of lavash, like other single-layer flatbreads, can easily be automated, contributing to its popularity across cultures.

Lavash comprises about 38% of bread consumption in Iran, as of 2024, and it is a staple food in may parts of the country. It is one of the four main breads of Iranian cuisine, alongside barbari, sangak, and taftoon, eaten in every part of Iran. These are all made of wheat, a common crop in many parts of Iran; lavash is the thinnest. The price of a single lavash in Iran is about 5 to 15 U.S. cents, and the profitability ratio, in Golestan Province, is about 55%. Affordability and ease of access make lavash and sangak very popular, and they contribute a large amount of food waste in Iran. Lavash and taftoon are the most common Iranian breads at restaurants.

Lavash is a staple of Armenian cuisine. A 2016 survey by the Statistical Committee of Armenia found that lavash comprised 16.9% of national bread intake, or 54 grams daily per capita. Lavash is served with most meals in Armenia, and the country's restaurants typically prepare it fresh. Armenians infrequently make lavash, instead storing it for a long time. Its preparation is a social event for women in a community, with each woman performing a different step of the process, while men contribute to the construction of tonirs and cushions. The dough and preparation method of lavash in each settlement may greatly vary as Armenia's mountainous geography causes relative isolation. Lavash made with the liquorice plant is used as folk medicine in Armenia.

Lavash is one of the main breads in Georgian cuisine. Lavash and another wheat bread, shoti, are staples in Eastern Georgia. It is one of few foods common between Armenian and Georgian cuisines. It is also widely eaten in Azerbaijani cuisine, including among Kurds in Azerbaijan. Lavash is one of the most common flatbreads in Turkish cuisine. The lavash served by Turkish grill restaurants is oblong and cooked until it forms a pocket like a pita; these restaurants serve it with tulum cheese. Lavash cooked on a saj is more common in the country's rural areas. In Kashmiri cuisine, lavash (known as lawaas) is widely eaten with butter and jam or as a wrap.

Homemade lavash is also made by the Armenian diaspora. Lavash is commonly found in North America, having been introduced by immigrants. In the United States, as of 2018, 10% of people have eaten lavash and 1% of food establishments serve it, according to Nation's Restaurant News. Lavash is also common in Tallinn, Estonia, due to Armenian immigration to the area. Lavash has been part of Russian cuisine since being introduced by Armenia during the Russian Armenia and Armenian SSR periods.

== In culture ==
Lavash is a wedding food in several countries. In Armenian weddings, it is traditional for a lavash to be placed on the couple's shoulders as a symbol of luck, wealth, and fertility. In the Sabirabad District of Azerbaijan, after a wedding, when the bride comes into her new house, her mother-in-law puts lavash on her shoulder and says: "Let you come to the house of wealth, let your foot be lucky". In Novkhani, Azerbaijan, after a funeral, it is customary for people to prepare kyulchya, which sometimes consists of halva wrapped up in lavash. Lavash is also used to swaddle babies in Armenia. An Armenian magical belief holds that, to push evil away from a child, a mother can bake a lavash shaped like a person from flour made by seven families, then place it under the child's pillow before burying it. Armenian Christians use lavash as a matagh sacrifice at some churches dedicated to Saint Stephen.

According to food writer Kate Leahy, lavash is the most significant bread in Armenia's culture. Many artworks depict the preparation of it, such as a painting by the Armenian American artist Manuel Tolegian, titled Armenian Ladies Baking Lavash, which was selected by U.S. President Gerald Ford to hang in the White House in 1976.

== See also ==
- List of breads
- Wedding tradition in Azerbaijan
