= Khorovats =

Meat dish traditional in Armenia

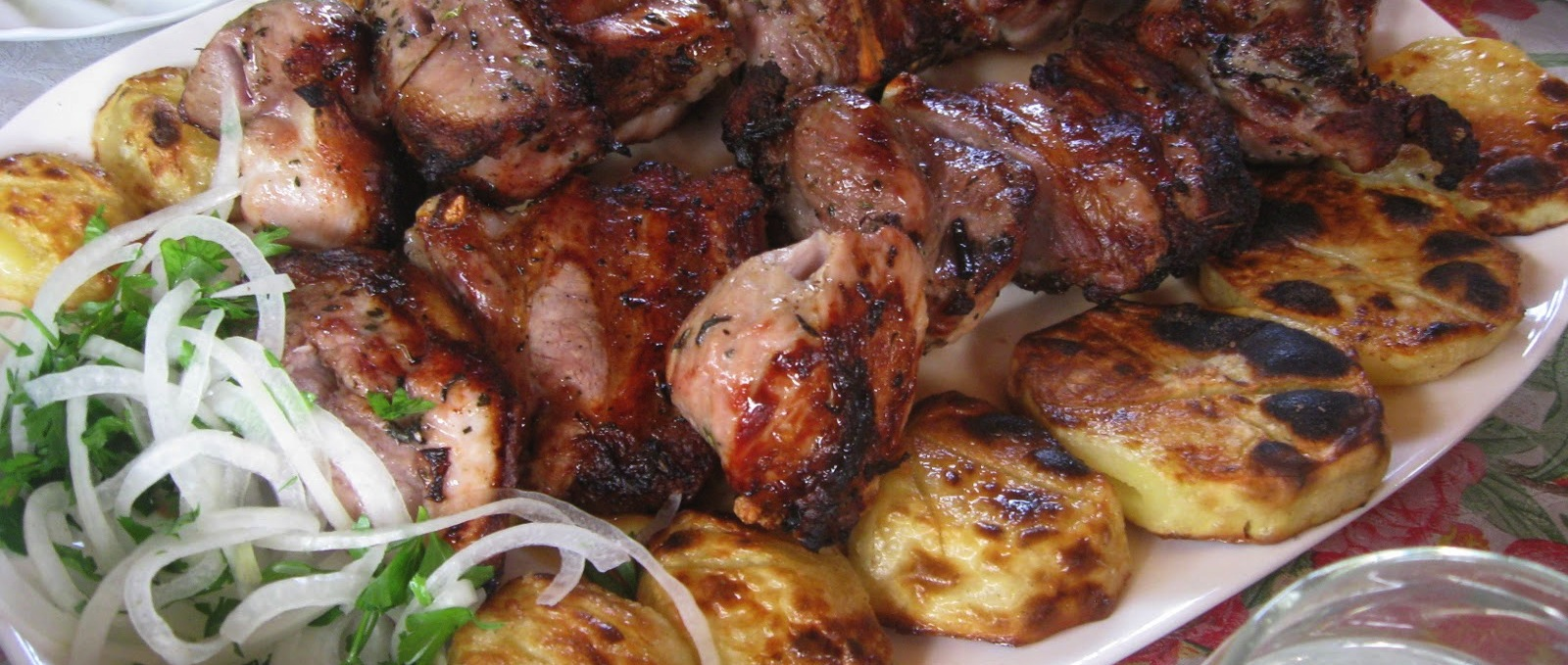
- Armenian khorovats
- Course: Main course
- Place of origin: Armenia
- Region or state: Armenia and Armenian diaspora
- Associated cuisine: Armenian cuisine
- Serving temperature: Hot
- Main ingredients: Meat

Khorovats (Armenian: խորոված, [χɔɾɔˈvɑt͡s]) is an Armenian grilled meat dish. The meat may be marinated before grilling, but it does not have to be. It can be made with lamb, pork, beef, chicken, fish, or even veal. This is generally a dish reserved for "festive occasions".

== Etymology ==
The word "խորոված" khorovats means "grilled" in Armenian and comes from the verb "խորովել" khorovel (to grill).

== Description ==
Khorovats can be made with lamb, pork, beef, chicken, or less commonly veal. Some type of vegetable is usually served with the meat. A common preparation for green vegetables like asparagus or green beans is to fry them and combine with whipped eggs, a dish which resembles scrambled eggs with vegetables. It is usually cooked in a tonir.

A typical khorovats is made of chunks of meat grilled on a shampoor (շամփուր) or skewer, although steaks or chops grilled without skewers may be also used.

In Armenia itself, khorovats is often made with the bone still in the meat (as lamb or pork chops).

Proshian Street in Yerevan is dubbed "Barbecue Street" by foreigners, because many khorovats restaurants are located on the street.

== In popular culture ==
In his The Travels of Sir John Chardin in Persia and the Orient, 17th-century French traveler Jean Chardin wrote:

The Armenians have a way of roasting the mutton and lamb in their own skin upon the coals, as they do chestnuts. When the mutton is dressed, they put the skin again upon it and sew it up well, and then they put it on the coals and cover it: the mutton is all night adoing, and it is not over and above good when it is done.

In a scene from the 1976 Soviet film When September Comes, prominent Armenian actor Armen Dzhigarkhanyan (Levon) makes khorovats with his grandson in the balcony of his daughter's Moscow apartment. His neighbors see smoke coming out of the balcony and call the firemen, but when a fireman arrives, everything settles down and all the neighbors gather at Levon's house to enjoy the dish.

Since 2009, an annual festival of khorovats has been held in Akhtala in northern Armenia. In 2012, John A. Heffern, the US ambassador to Armenia, was among 15,000 guests of the festival.

== Sources ==
- Albala, Ken (2011). Food Cultures of the World Encyclopedia. Vol. 2. Santa Barbara, California: ABC-CLIO. ISBN 9780313376269.
