= Žrnovnica (river) =

River in Croatia

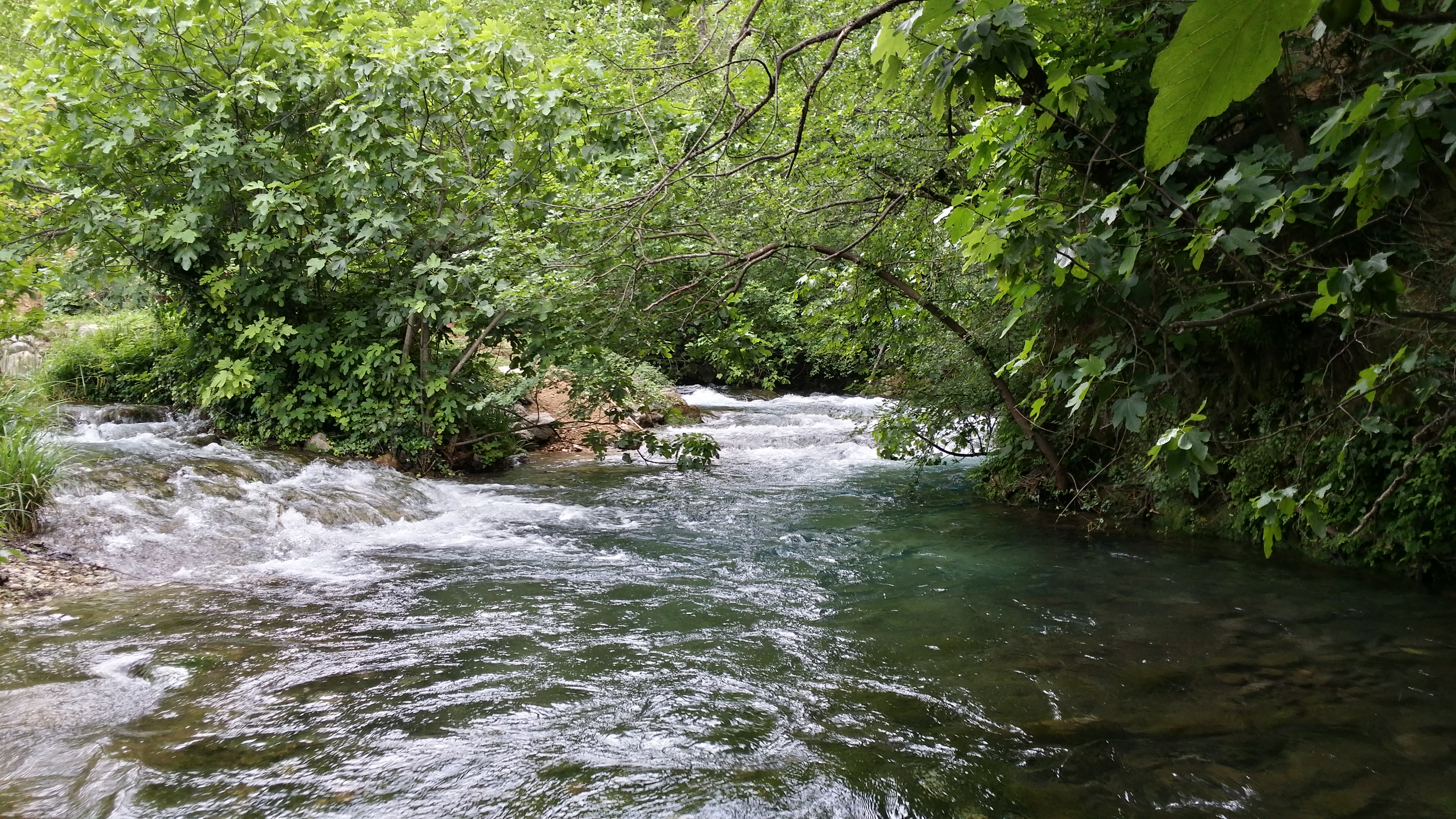
- Shooting location for the TV show Game of Thrones

- Location within Croatia

Location
- County: Croatia
- Municipalities: Podstrana, Split
- Cities: Žrnovnica, Stobreč, Podstrana

Physical characteristics
- Source: Vrilo A)
  - location: Dvori, Žrnovnica
  - coordinates: 43.52353°N 16.57438°E
- 2nd source: Vrilo B)
  - location: Dvori, Žrnovnica
  - coordinates: 43.5234°N 16.57509°E
- Mouth: Adriatic Sea
  - location: between Stobreč and Podstrana
  - coordinates: 43.50476°N 16.53075°E
  - elevation: 0 m (0 ft)
- Length: 4.8 km (3.0 mi)

Basin features
- River system: direct Adriatic watershed
- Cities: Dvori, Žrnovnica, Stobreč, Podstrana

Žrnovnica is a river in Croatia that springs at the foot of the Mosor, near Dvori village, in Split municipality, and in its short course flows through Žrnovnica and Podstrana settlements, in the wider area of city of Split, in the Split-Dalmatia County. The total length of the river is 4,800 meters. Its basin is a direct Adriatic Sea watershed.

== Course and features ==
Žrnovnica is a karst river, and in its upper course, is classified mountain river with very clear and cold waters, faster flow with small rapids and waterfalls. It flows through the settlement of the same name, Žrnovnica, and flows into the Adriatic only a few kilometers from Split in the direction of Omiš.

In its upper course, Žrnovnica passes through a nearly inaccessible gorge, making it a preserved part of the river. A promenade was made along the lower part of the river bank, and the rest of the bank was overgrown with willows and figs with other aquatic and riparian vegetation.

In the upper course, the river is inhabited by highly endangered endemic salmonid species, so called softmouth trout, also known as the Adriatic trout (Salmo obtusirostris), while the lower course has healthy populations of rainbow trout, eel, and some brown trout.

The softmouth trout is a special feature of Žrnovnica. It was introduced from nearby Jadro river, and it is one of a handful of rivers in Adriatic watershed, along with Jadro, to host this species, others being Vrljika, Neretva, Zeta and Morača. Its subspecies, S. o. salonitana, can also be found in Žrnovnica.

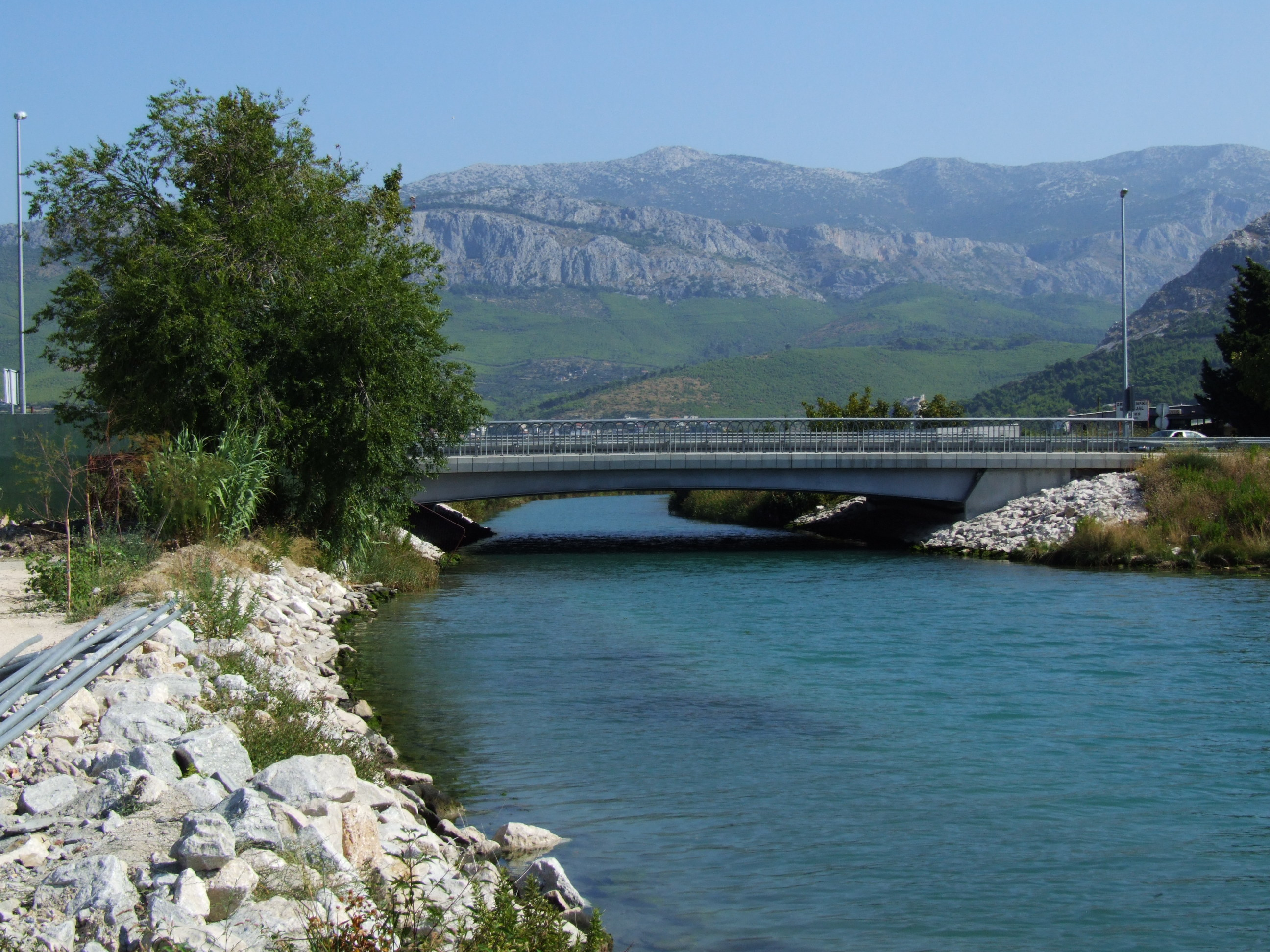
Žrnovnica river mouth
