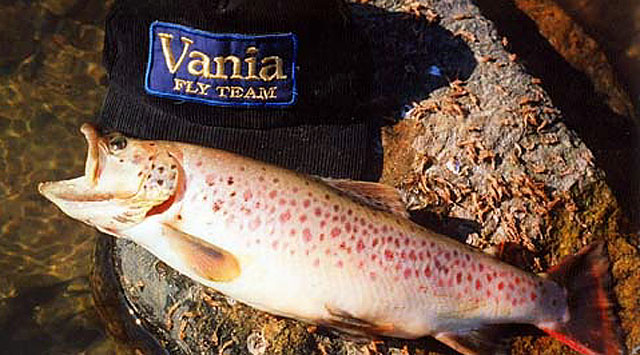

Conservation status
- Least Concern (IUCN 3.1)

Scientific classification
- Kingdom: Animalia
- Phylum: Chordata
- Class: Actinopterygii
- Division: Teleostei
- Order: Salmoniformes
- Family: Salmonidae
- Genus: Salmo
- Species: S. macedonicus

Binomial name
- Salmo macedonicus (S. L. Karaman, 1924)

= Salmo macedonicus =

Species of fish

Salmo macedonicus is a species of fish in the family Salmonidae. It is found in the basins of the rivers Vardar, Struma and Mesta in North Macedonia, Bulgaria and Greece. It is threatened by habitat loss.

The taxonomic status of this fish is controversial.
