= Salmo pellegrini =

Scientific classification
- Kingdom: Animalia
- Phylum: Chordata
- Class: Actinopterygii
- Division: Teleostei
- Order: Salmoniformes
- Family: Salmonidae
- Genus: Salmo
- Species: S. pellegrini

Binomial name
- Salmo pellegrini Werner, 1931

Synonyms
- Salmo trutta pellegrini Werner, 1931

Species of ray-finned fish

The Tensift trout (Salmo pellegrini) is a species of ray-finned fish in the genus Salmo. It is named for the river it was first described from, the Tensift River. It has also been recognized to be native in the Oum er rbia river system as well, and is known for only being native to Morocco. The Tensift trout fits into the Atlantic lineage along with the rest of the North African trout species, excluding the Dades trout.
