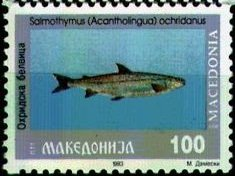

Conservation status
- Endangered (IUCN 3.1)

Scientific classification
- Kingdom: Animalia
- Phylum: Chordata
- Class: Actinopterygii
- Division: Teleostei
- Order: Salmoniformes
- Family: Salmonidae
- Genus: Salmo
- Species: S. ohridanus

Binomial name
- Salmo ohridanus Steindachner, 1892

Synonyms
- Acantholingua ohridana Salmothymus ohridanus

= Salmo ohridanus =

Species of fish

Salmo ohridanus, also known locally as the belvica in North Macedonia or belushka in Albania, is a species of freshwater salmonid fish, endemic to Lake Ohrid in Albania and North Macedonia.

Salmo ohridanus is a relatively small fish, usually shorter than 30 cm (12 in) and less than 0.5 kg (1.1 lb) in weight. It is a commercially exploited species subject to heavy fishing, and has been bred in fish farms for over 50 years. It has also been intentionally hybridized with another endemic species, the Ohrid trout (Salmo letnica). It is threatened by the hybridization, degradation of water quality and overfishing; but the stock remains abundant.

In earlier literature the belvica has variously been treated as belonging to suggested endemic genera Acantholingua and Salmothymus. Genetic studies however indicate it is a good member of the genus Salmo, and closest to the softmouth trout Salmo obtusirostris. Nevertheless, it is quite distinct from the brown trout complex.
