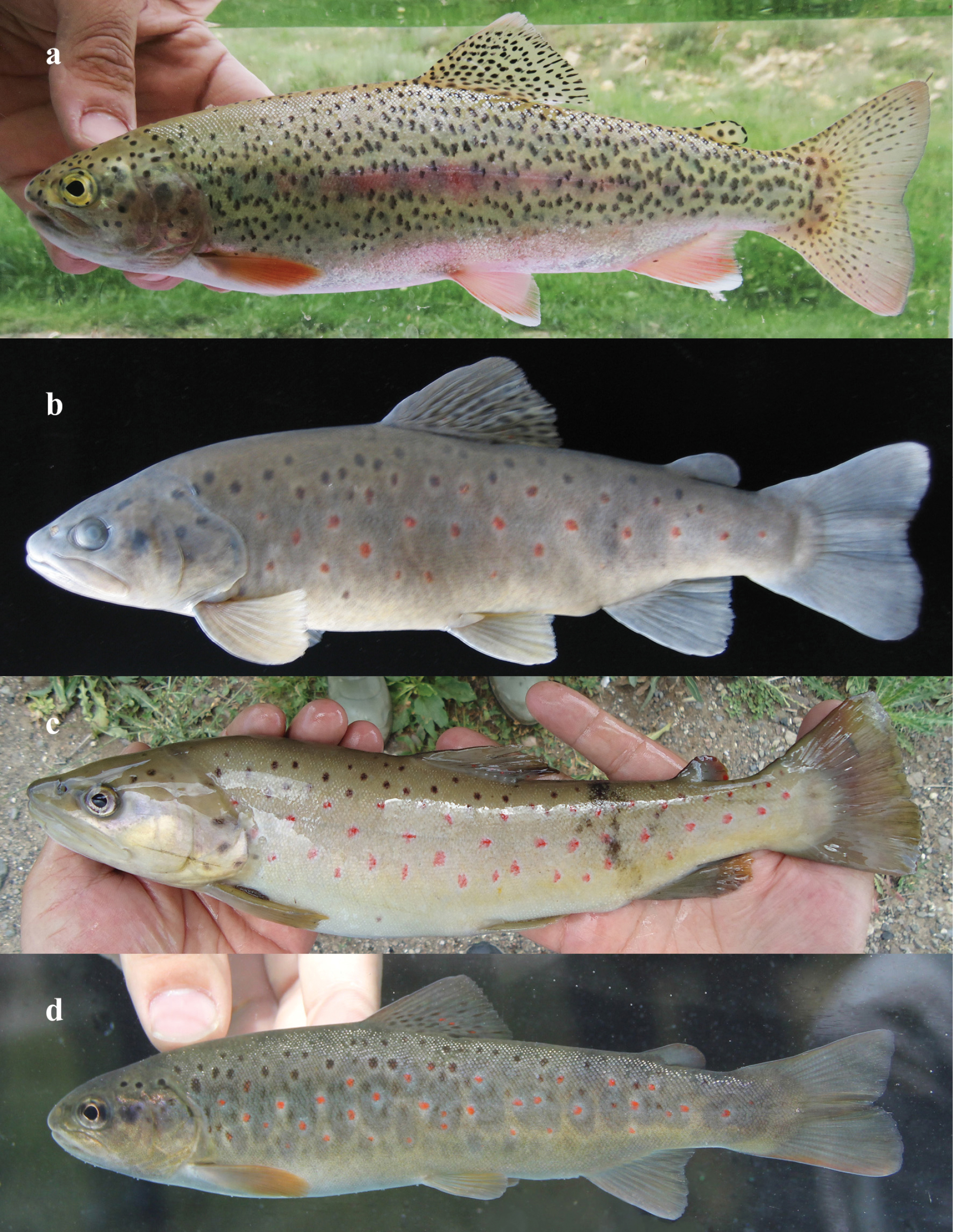

Scientific classification
- Domain: Eukaryota
- Kingdom: Animalia
- Phylum: Chordata
- Class: Actinopterygii
- Order: Salmoniformes
- Family: Salmonidae
- Genus: Salmo
- Species: S. ciscaucasicus

Binomial name
- Salmo ciscaucasicus Dorofeeva, 1967

Synonyms
- Salmo trutta ciscaucasicus Dorofeeva, 1967

= Salmo ciscaucasicus =

Species of fish

Salmo ciscaucasicus, the Caspian salmon or Terek trout, is a salmonid fish endemic to the Caspian Sea and its inflowing rivers. It was described in 1967 originally as a subspecies of Salmo trutta. S. ciscaucasicus lives on the western shore of the lake from northern Azerbaijan to the Ural River, while the main breeding river is the Terek. It lives at depths down to 50 m. Males can reach a maximum standard length of 130 cm. Forms of the species include anadromous, lacustrine, and resident. In the northern Ural and Volga, there may be hybrids between S. ciscaucasicus and S. trutta.

Another species, Salmo caspius Kessler, 1877, inhabits the southern part of the Caspian, but it is considerably smaller in size.
