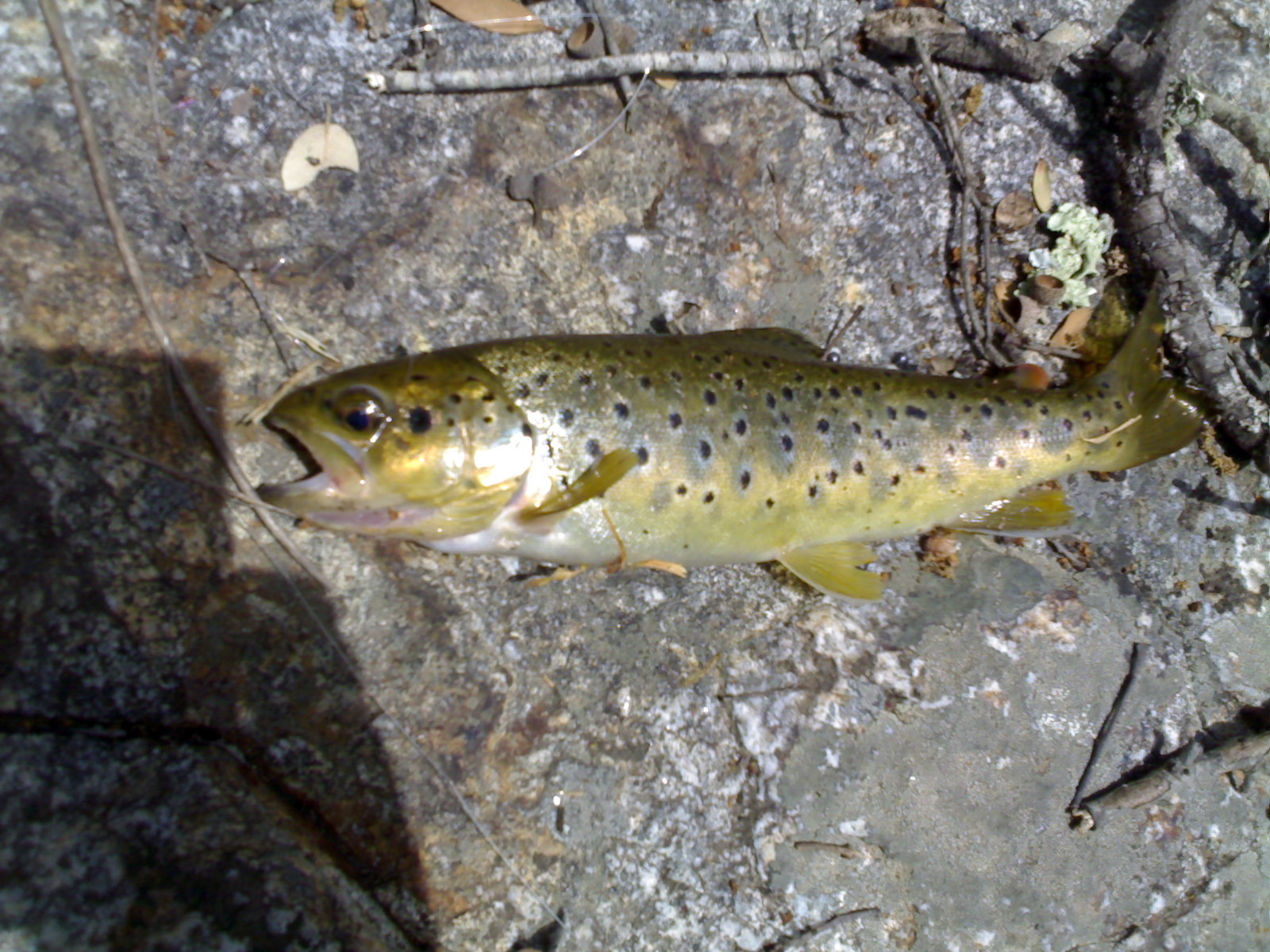

Conservation status
- Near Threatened (IUCN 3.1)

Scientific classification
- Domain: Eukaryota
- Kingdom: Animalia
- Phylum: Chordata
- Class: Actinopterygii
- Order: Salmoniformes
- Family: Salmonidae
- Genus: Salmo
- Species: S. cettii

Binomial name
- Salmo cettii Rafinesque, 1810

= Salmo cettii =

Species of fish

Salmo cettii, or the Mediterranean trout, is a species of trout, a freshwater fish in the family Salmonidae. It lives in the Mediterranean region in Corsica, Sardinia, Sicily, and on the Italian mainland in the Magra drainage and further south. It is a nonmigratory fish which lives in streams and in karstic resurgences. It is smaller than 40 cm (16 in) in length. It is sometimes referred to Salmo trutta macrostigma, which depending on concept is either a more widespread Mediterranean taxon, or a taxon endemic to Algeria.
