= Gomgush =

Traditional Armenian banquet stew

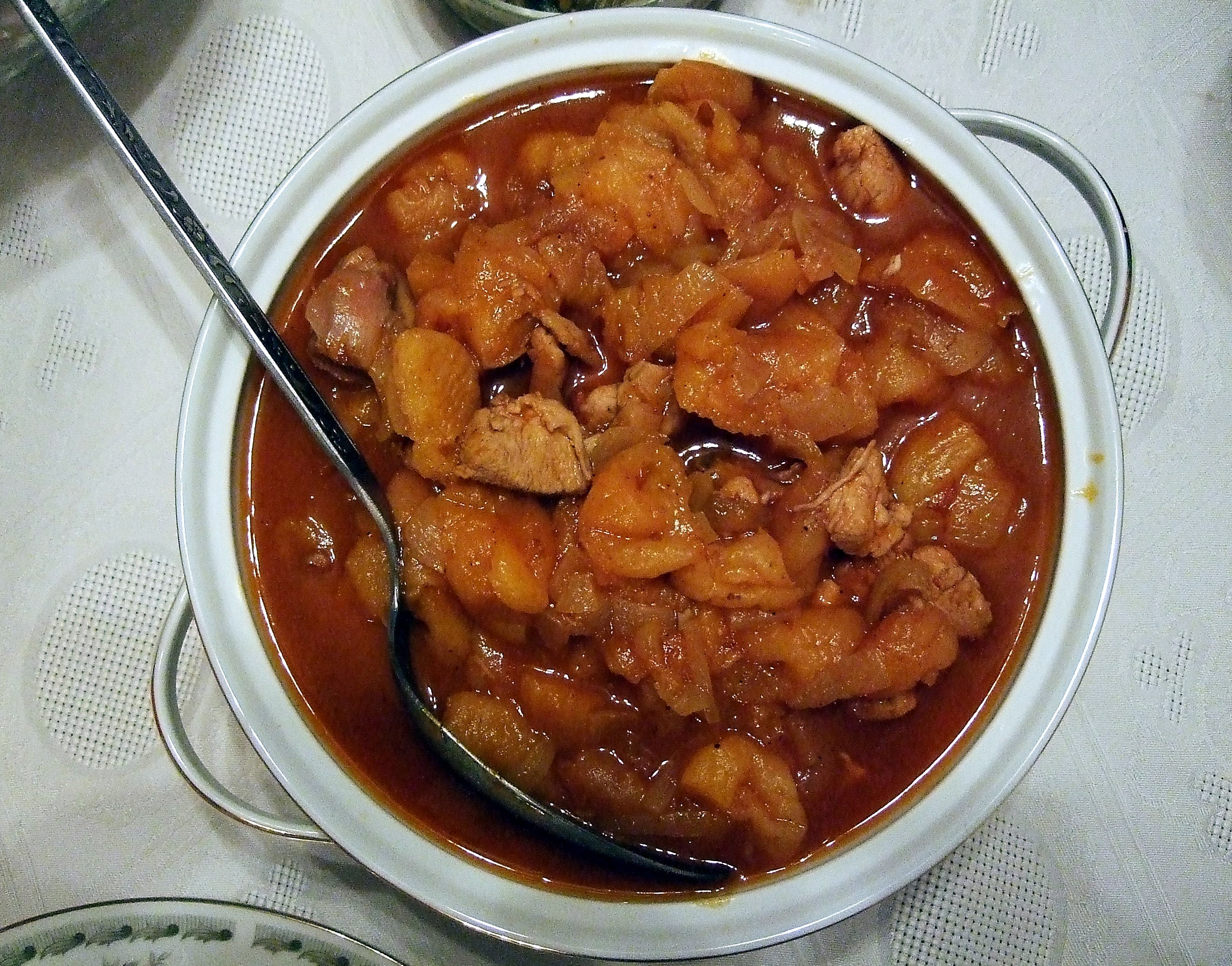
- Type: Stew
- Place of origin: Armenia
- Main ingredients: Meat or Sevan trout, vegetables, legumes
- Ingredients generally used: Summer squash, tomatoes, chickpeas, pumpkin, matzoon, garlic, mint, pepper paste, dill, prunes
- Variations: Ainteb
- Similar dishes: Dzhash

Gomgush (Armenian: ղամղուշ) is a traditional Armenian banquet stew, resembling dzhash (Ճաշ) but with added ingredients. A gomgush is often served at celebrations including weddings and banquets. Gomgush is a brothy stew including an array of meats and legumes, several vegetables, and spices. Gomgush is typically cooked in the tonir.

Ingredients may include summer squash, tomato sauce, prunes, garlic, mint, chickpeas, sevan trout, pumpkin, matzoon, pepper paste, and dill. In Ainteb, gomgush may include the liberal use of dried mint, tomatoes, and lemon juice. Often, when cooked in a tonir or cauldron, the same container may cook hundreds of stews without being washed, contributing to growingly complex tastes.

== See also ==
- List of stews
