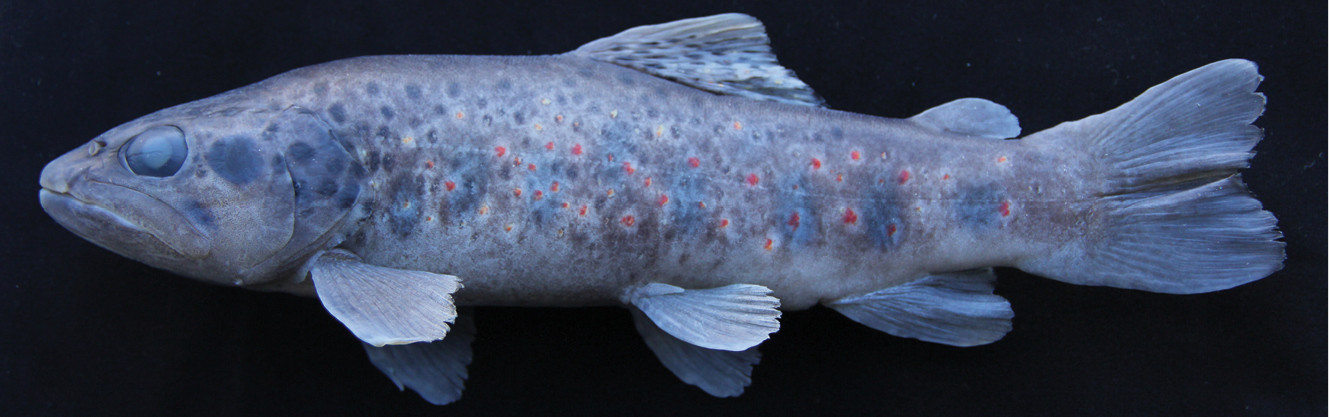
- Male (holotype), 205 mm (8.07 in)
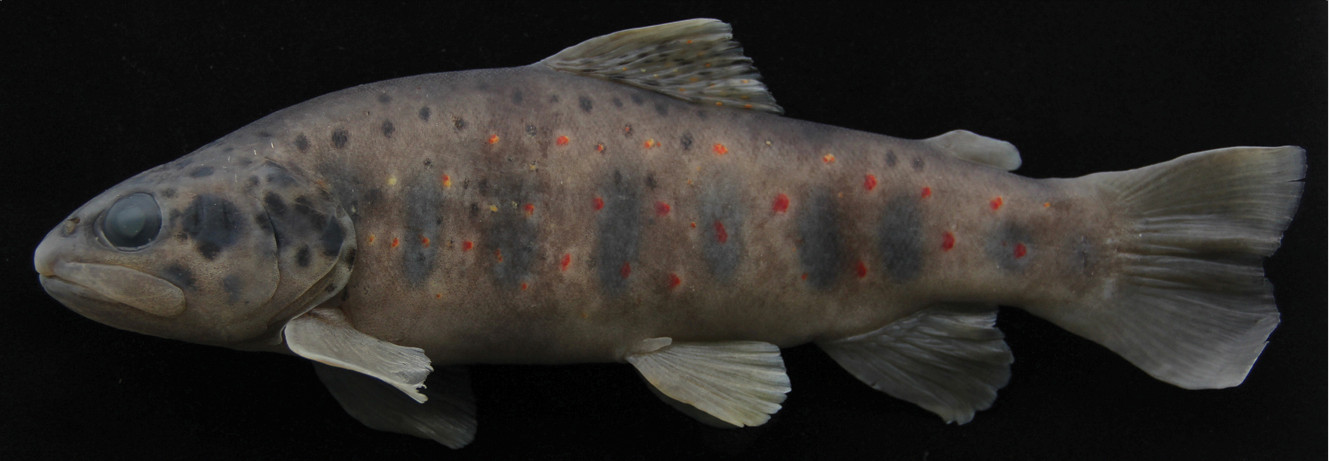
- Female (paratype), 208 mm (8.19 in)

Scientific classification
- Kingdom: Animalia
- Phylum: Chordata
- Class: Actinopterygii
- Order: Salmoniformes
- Family: Salmonidae
- Genus: Salmo
- Species: S. kottelati

Binomial name
- Salmo kottelati Turan, Doğan, Kaya, & Kanyılmaz, 2014
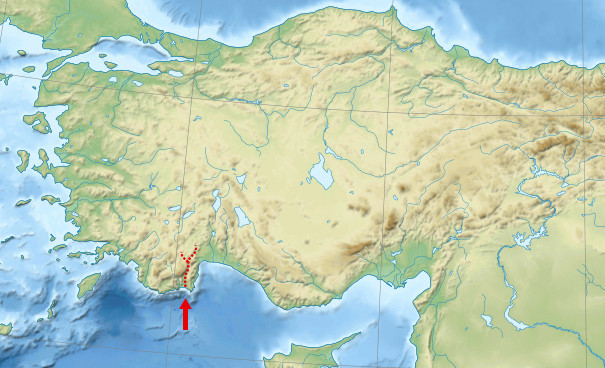
- Approximate location of Alakır Stream in Antalya Province, Turkey

= Salmo kottelati =

Species of fish

Salmo kottelati is a species of trout endemic to the Alakır Stream of Antalya Province in southern Turkey. It was previously considered part of Salmo macrostigma (Salmo trutta macrostigma).

== Etymology ==
The fish is named in honor of Swiss ichthyologist Maurice Kottelat (b. 1957), because of his contributions to the study of European and Asian fishes.
