= Salmo chilo =

Conservation status
- Vulnerable (IUCN 3.1)

Scientific classification
- Kingdom: Animalia
- Phylum: Chordata
- Class: Actinopterygii
- Division: Teleostei
- Order: Salmoniformes
- Family: Salmonidae
- Genus: Salmo
- Species: S. chilo

Binomial name
- Salmo chilo Turan, Kottelat & Engin, 2012

Species of fish

Salmo chilo, the Ceyhan trout or chilo trout, is a species of freshwater ray-finned fish belonging to the family Salmonidae, which contains the trout, salmon, char and related fishes. This trout is endemic to Turkey where it is known from a single river basin.

== Taxonomy ==
Salmo chilo was first formally described in 2012 by the ichthyologists Davut Turan, Maurice Kottelat and Semih Engin with its type locality given as Akdere Stream at Gürün county in the Euphrates River drainage of Sivas Province in Turkey. This taxon is a member of the Salmo trutta species complex and some authorities regard it as being a form or subspecies of the brown trout. Salmo chilo is a member of the gensu Salmo, which includes the Old World trout and the Atlantic salmon (S. salar). The genus Salmo is placed in the subfamily Salmoninae within the family Salmonidae on the order Salmoniformes.

== Etymology ==
Salmo chilo is classified in the genus Salmo, this anme is Latin for trout or salmon. The specific name, chilo, is a Latin word for a person who has a big lip, a reference to the obvious subterminal mouth of this species, with its fleshy maxilla and lower lip.

== Description ==
Salmo chilo reaches a standard length of 23.5 cm (9.3 in) and has an elongate body shape. It is distinguishable by having four dark bands on the sides in both males and females; the dorsal profile of the head is highly convex; the snout is blunt; and the mouth is obviuously subterminal with a fleshy maxilla and lower lip.

== Distribution and habitat ==
Salmo chilo is known only from the its type locality, the Akdere Stream, which is a tributary of Ceyhan River in Turkey. It is found in spring-fed upland streams.
