= Salmo opimus =

Conservation status
- Endangered (IUCN 3.1)

Scientific classification
- Kingdom: Animalia
- Phylum: Chordata
- Class: Actinopterygii
- Order: Salmoniformes
- Family: Salmonidae
- Genus: Salmo
- Species: S. opimus

Binomial name
- Salmo opimus Turan, Kottelat & Engin, 2012

Species of fish

Salmo opimus is a salmonid fish in the genus Salmo. It was described by Davut Turan, Maurice Kottelat and Semih Engin in 2012, and is known from Turkey. The type locality was the Alara Stream in Gündoğmuş, Antalya Province. The species epithet, "opimus" (meaning "opulent" in Latin) refers to the large body size of the adults.
