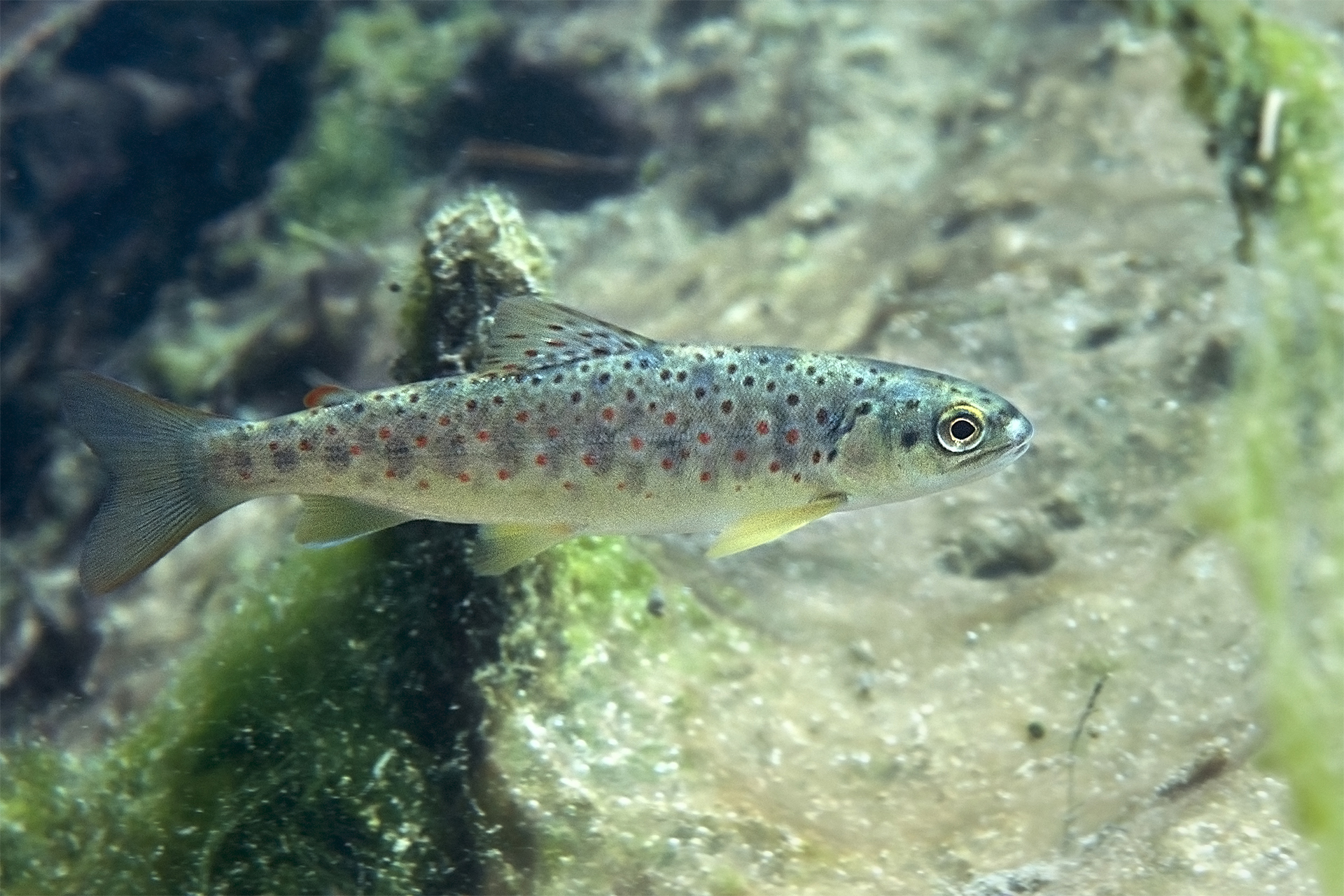

Scientific classification
- Domain: Eukaryota
- Kingdom: Animalia
- Phylum: Chordata
- Class: Actinopterygii
- Order: Salmoniformes
- Family: Salmonidae
- Genus: Salmo
- Species: S. farioides

Binomial name
- Salmo farioides Karaman, 1938

Synonyms
- Salmo ghigii; Salmo mediterraneus; Salmo visovacensis; Salmo zrmanjaensis

= Salmo farioides =

Species of fish

Salmo farioides, commonly known as the West Balkan trout, the Adriatic brown trout, or the Balkan brook trout, is a species of ray-finned fish found in the Balkans, including Albania, Croatia, North Macedonia, among others. It is an important fish in numerous rivers and lakes throughout the region. Identification of Salmo farioides is difficult due to the high degree of endemism in the western Adriatic and Mediterranean area, particularly among salmonid species, and because of high phenotypic diversity among trout populations specifically.

== Description ==
Salmo farioides is characterized by large red spots, which are sometimes surrounded by whiteish areas, along the flanks and faint vertical bands that are residuals of parr marks.

Among mature individuals, females and males are roughly the same length and weight (36 mm and 458 g, respectively), based on measurements from a population sampled from the Morača River in Montenegro. Sexual maturity is reached after the second summer of life, with spawning occurring between October and through January. Spawning begins when the water temperature is greater than 10 °C (50 °F).

Salmo farioides was originally described by Stanko Karaman in 1938; because the entire Karaman fish collection was lost, Salmo farioides is a neotype. The species like originates from stock that entered the mountainous area of the western Po drainage in the Pleistocene era. It is hypothesized that Salmo farioides colonized the upper part of the Apennine slopes into the Po drainage and eventually reached the lower part of the river, moving towards the Adriatic during the Würm glaciation, where it would have entered the Neretva River.

Salmo farioides feeds on mainly bottom-dwelling invertebrates and is found in small, flow-flowing streams. However the microhabitat of Salmo farioides varies by size of the individual: large fish select deeper microhabitats with slower water speeds, whereas small and medium fish prefer medium-depth microhabitats with slightly faster speeds.

== Ecology ==
Salmo farioides serves as a bioindicator of the quality in upland rivers where it dominates cold-water streams and is at the top of the trophic pyramid. It is considered as a vulnerable species based on a state-wide threat assessment as a result of climate change and increasing water temperatures in their habitats, as well as overfishing due to recreational fishing. (Note: This species has not yet been assessed by the IUCN or is considered data deficient) Hydrological modeling suggests that, based on pessimistic projections about the CO_{2} concentrations by the end of the century, suitable habitat for Salmo farioides will substantially decrease.

Salmo farioides is found in Mavrovo National Park in North Macedonia where part of its habitat would have been damaged by the Boškov Most Hydro Power Plant; as a result of the habitat destruction, international funding was pulled from the project.
