= Jadro Spring =

Croatian spring

The Jadro Spring is a water source rising in the Dinaric Alps in Croatia. The spring was the original water supply for the ancient city comprised by Diocletian's Palace (now an area within the present day city of Split). Contemporary studies indicate favourable water quality levels at the spring source. The Jadro Spring is the source of the Jadro River. A rare species found in the upper reach of the Jadro River is the soft-mouthed trout, Salmothymus obtusirostris salonitana.

== See also ==
- Croatia
- Jadro River
- Karst
