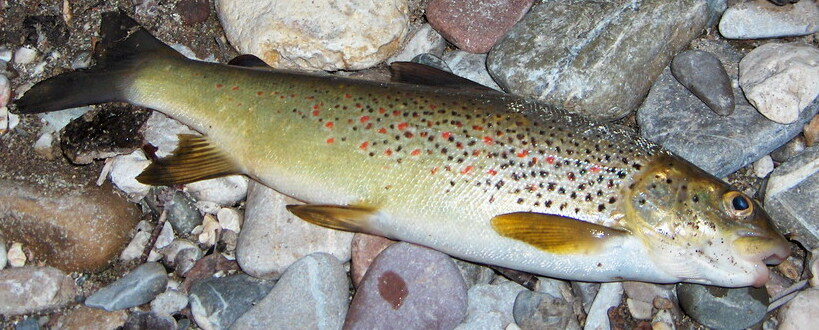
- Softmouth from the Upper Neretva

Conservation status
- Vulnerable (IUCN 3.1)

Scientific classification
- Kingdom: Animalia
- Phylum: Chordata
- Class: Actinopterygii
- Division: Teleostei
- Order: Salmoniformes
- Family: Salmonidae
- Genus: Salmo
- Species: S. obtusirostris

Binomial name
- Salmo obtusirostris (Heckel, 1851)

Subspecies
- S. o. oxyrhynchus; S. o. salonitana; S. o. krkensis; S. o. zetensis

= Salmo obtusirostris =

Species of fish

Salmo obtusirostris, commonly known as the softmouth trout, also known as the Adriatic trout, or Adriatic salmon, is a species of salmonid fish endemic to a handful rivers spilling into Adriatic in the Western Balkans, in southeastern Europe, namely in Bosnia and Herzegovina, Croatia and Montenegro. The scientific name has changed several times through history; synonyms include Thymallus microlepis, Salmothymus obtusirostris and Salar obtusirostris.

This species spawns in the early spring and is an obligatory freshwater fish. They are an important game fish in the region.

== Distribution and subspecies ==
Salmo obtusirostris is found naturally in four drainages of the Adriatic Sea, in Croatia, Bosnia and Herzegovina and Montenegro: the Neretva-Vrljika system, the Jadro, the Morača-Zeta system, and possibly the Krka river drainage around Knin although it is presumed extinct for some time now.

In addition, sometimes during 1960s, it has been introduced from the Jadro river to the nearby Žrnovnica river, both being small karst, single river drainages, of very short course, in vicinity of Split.

Although the Vrljika belongs to the Neretva River drainage it's a sinking river, divided into several surface and underground segments, hence separated from the Neretva River in significant manner regarding the softmouth trout populations. However, the Vrljika softmouth trout is apparently most similar to the Neretva's subspecies, while some autapomorphies exist in the Vrljika population. The Vrljika softmouth trout appears to have originated from a vicariance that split a common ancestral population into large (Neretva) and small (Vrljika) fragmented populations.

The different populations are sometimes classified into subspecies:

- Salmo obtusirostris oxyrhynchus: Neretva and its tributaries the Buna and its tributary Bunica, the Bregava, the Upperr and Lower Trebižat, and the Rama before construction of the Rama Dam, in Bosnia and Herzegovina; it also inhabit the Vrljika within both Croatia and Bosnia and Herzegovina.
- Salmo obtusirostris salonitana: the Jadro River and the Žrnovnica River (introduced from the nearby Jadro in the 1960s) in Croatia;
- Salmo obtusirostris krkensis: the Krka river (inhabited only about one kilometer of the river's headwater, but is now most likely extinct); in Croatia
- Salmo obtusirostris zetensis: the Zeta River and the Morača River in Montenegro.

== Appearance and anatomy ==
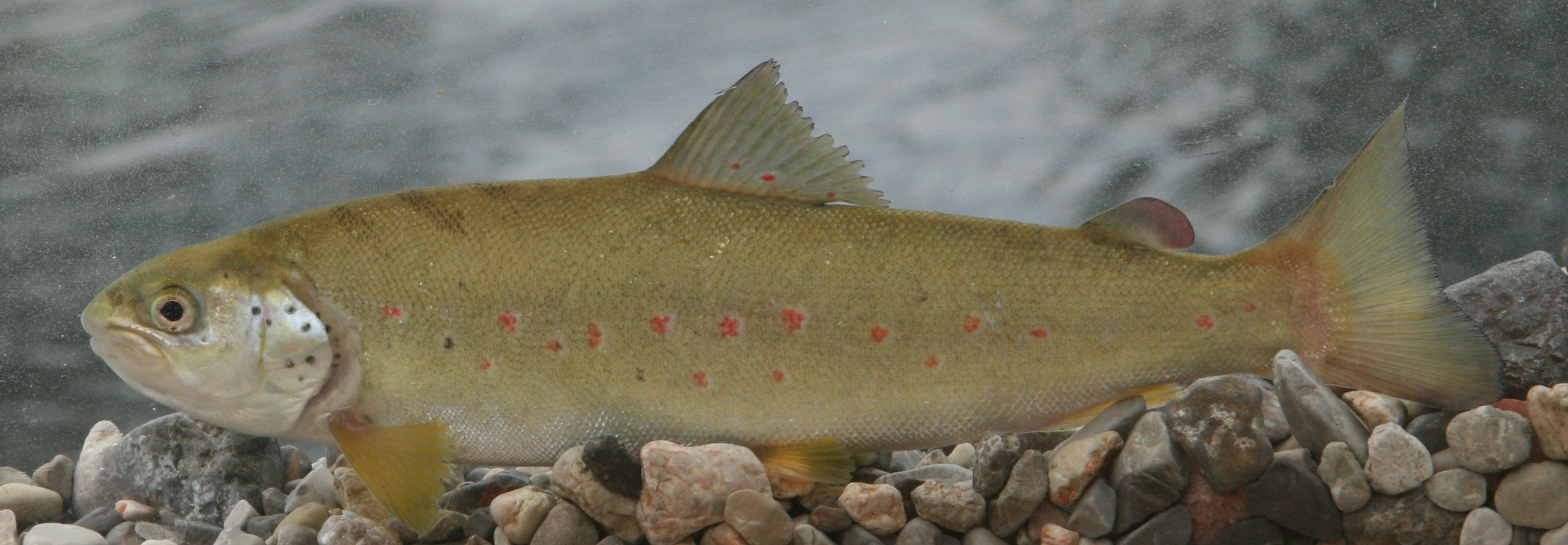
Softmouth from the Vrljika

The most obvious characteristic of the Adriatic trout is an elongated snout. It also has a small and fleshy mouth, relatively large scales and high body depth. The color of the body varies between subspecies, it is mostly green with red and black dots. There are no vertical stripes that are common in brown trout of the Adriatic Sea drainages that can be found.

== Conservation ==
Adriatic trout are threatened by excessive damming, hybridization with introduced species and overfishing. In the river Neretva, natural hybrids (named kosor by locals) between Adriatic and brown trout can be found. Hybridization was also confirmed experimentally. Adriatic trout prefers rivers with more water and wide riverbed. Adriatic and brown trout have different spawning times that overlap only slightly every few years, which is why natural hybridization is not widespread and both species live sympatrically in the same rivers.

== Bibliography ==
- Weiss, Steven Joseph; Đug, Samir; Marčić, Zoran; Oikonomou, Anthi; Shumka, Spase; Mušović, Aldijana; Škrijelj, Rifat; Simonović, Predag; Vesnić, Adi (2018). Endangered Fish Species in Balkan Rivers: Their distributions and threats from hydropower development (pdf). Riverwatch and EuroNatur. doi:10.13140/RG.2.2.22638.10563 – via ResearchGate.
