= Salmo taleri =

Conservation status
- Endangered (IUCN 3.1)

Scientific classification
- Kingdom: Animalia
- Phylum: Chordata
- Class: Actinopterygii
- Order: Salmoniformes
- Family: Salmonidae
- Genus: Salmo
- Species: S. taleri

Binomial name
- Salmo taleri S. L. Karaman, 1933

Species of fish

Salmo taleri, also known as the Nikšić trout, is a species of freshwater fish in the salmon family. It is found in the Upper Zeta river and Moraca drainage in Montenegro.

== Description ==
The fish can reach a maximum recorded length of 30 cm (12 in). It lives near or at the bottom of the water body. There are quite a few black spots on the flank and side of head.
