= Salmo coruhensis =

Conservation status
- Near Threatened (IUCN 3.1)

Scientific classification
- Kingdom: Animalia
- Phylum: Chordata
- Class: Actinopterygii
- Order: Salmoniformes
- Family: Salmonidae
- Genus: Salmo
- Species: S. coruhensis

Binomial name
- Salmo coruhensis Turan, Kottelat & Engin, 2010

Species of fish

Salmo coruhensis is a species of trout, a freshwater salmonid fish. It lives in streams flowing into the Black Sea, in Turkey and possibly Georgia.

This fish is silvery in colour with distinctive red spots and can grow to 80 cm (31 in) length. It lives in clear, flowing water, particularly in middle stretches of the main branches of rivers and streams. On the other hand, it is also found in short coastal streams. After spawning it moves to the sea but stays near the river mouths, or in the lower stretches of rivers. It migrates upstream to breed in October–November.

Etymology; named after Çoruh River due to mainly occurring within Çoruh basin.
