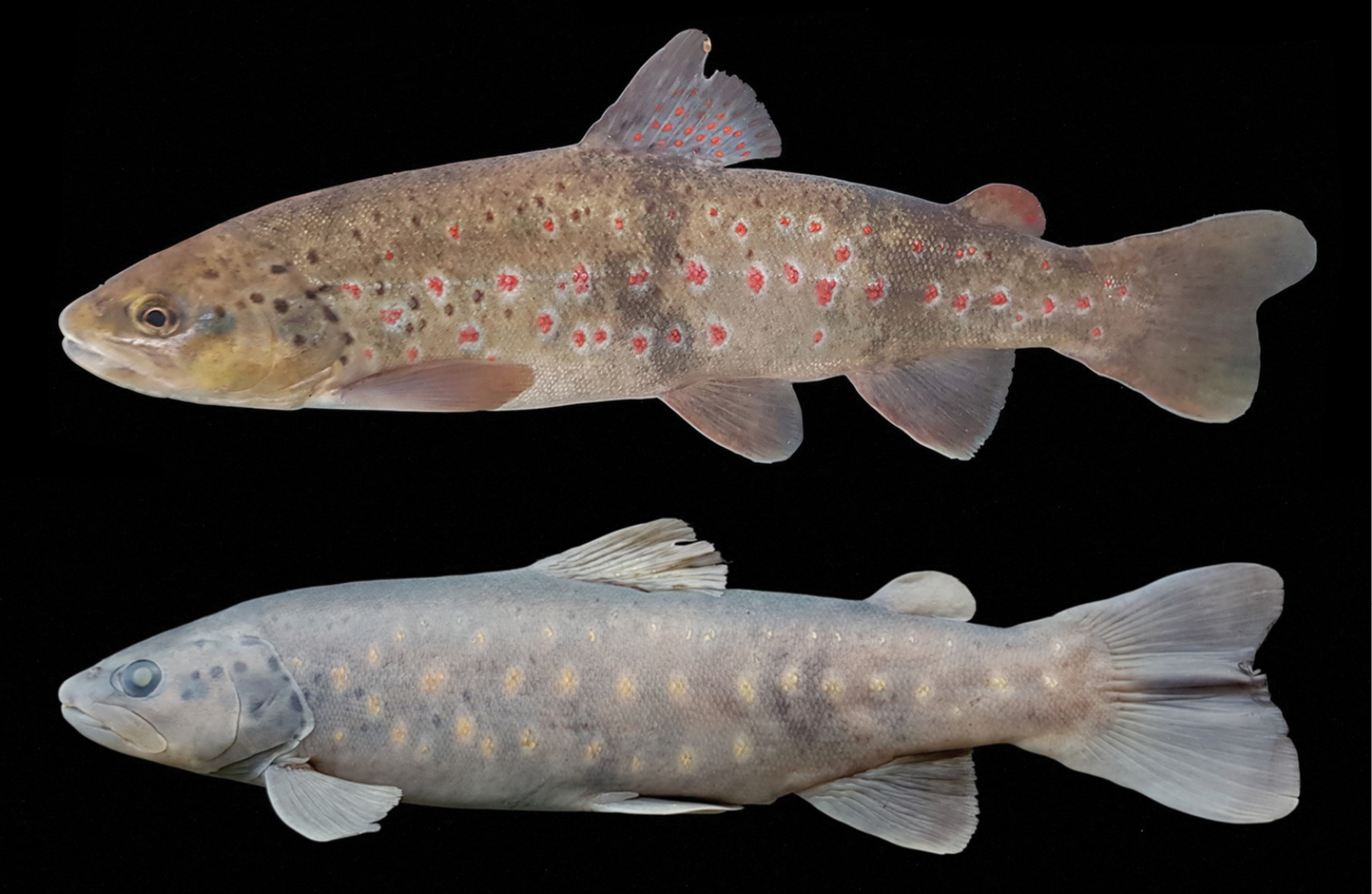

Scientific classification
- Domain: Eukaryota
- Kingdom: Animalia
- Phylum: Chordata
- Class: Actinopterygii
- Order: Salmoniformes
- Family: Salmonidae
- Genus: Salmo
- Species: S. baliki

Binomial name
- Salmo baliki Turan, İsmail Aksu, Münevver Oral, Kaya, Bayçelebi, 2021

= Salmo baliki =

Species of fish

Salmo baliki is a species of trout, a type of salmonid fish. It is described from the Murat River, a drainage of the Euphrates River.
