= Salmo balcanicus =

Conservation status
- Critically endangered, possibly extinct (IUCN 3.1)

Scientific classification
- Kingdom: Animalia
- Phylum: Chordata
- Class: Actinopterygii
- Order: Salmoniformes
- Family: Salmonidae
- Genus: Salmo
- Species: S. balcanicus

Binomial name
- Salmo balcanicus (S. L. Karaman, 1927)

Species of fish

Salmo balcanicus is a type of trout, a fish in the family Salmonidae. It is endemic to Lake Ohrid and its outlet in North Macedonia and Albania in the Balkans.

Salmo balcanicus is one of four different forms of the Ohrid trout complex which is endemic to the single lake, along with Salmo letnica, Salmo aphelios and Salmo lumi. The various forms, suggested to be different species, are distinguished by their breeding time and habitat, by which they in practice are reproductively isolated from each other. There is no support for their distinct species status from molecular data however. Salmo balcanicus specifically spawns from October to January at the outlet of the lake, Black Drin, in the northwestern end of the lake near the Macedonian-Albanian border area. As the river has been dammed, it is suspected that the population may have gone extinct.

The flesh of Salmo balcanicus is typically of pale pink colour. Overall the Ohrid trouts are silvery in colour, with black dots. Red dots occur along the lateral line. Salmo balcanicus can grow to 40 cm (16 in) length.
