= Salmo obtusirostris salonitana =

Scientific classification
- Kingdom: Animalia
- Phylum: Chordata
- Class: Actinopterygii
- Order: Salmoniformes
- Family: Salmonidae
- Genus: Salmo
- Species: S. obtusirostris
- Subspecies: S. o. salonitana

Trinomial name
- Salmo obtusirostris salonitana Karaman, 1926

Subspecies of fish

Salmo obtusirostris salonitana (also termed by the common names soft-muzzled trout or Solin salmon and the scientific synonym Salmothymus obtusirostris salonitana) is an endemic trout subspecies found in the Jadro River in the vicinity of Solin (Dalmatia, Croatia), and in the nearby Žrnovnica River, where it was introduced in 1964. The upper reaches of the Jadro River including Jadro Spring, covering an area of 7.8 hectares, have been protected as an ichthyological reserve since 1984, for the purpose of preserving this endangered fish species, S. o. salonitana.

This fish species is thought to be endangered not only by historic river diversions, but by increasing urbanisation, overfishing and by the presence of the rainbow trout, introduced into the Jadro before World War II.

== Bibliography ==
- Gabelica, Ivan, ed. (2018). Protected Areas of Nature (PDF). Public Institution for the Management of Protected Areas in the County of Split and Dalmatia - "Sea and karst". ISBN 978-953-56977-5-6. Archived from the original (PDF) on 2018-12-03.
- Radović, Jasminka; Čivić, Kristijan; Topić, Ramona, eds. (2006). Biodiversity of Croatia (PDF). Zagreb: State Institute for Nature Protection, Ministry of Culture - Republic of Croatia. ISBN 953-7169-20-0. Archived from the original (PDF) on 2023-04-15.
- Tomljanović, Tea; Treer, Tomislav; Aničić, Ivica; Safner, Roman; Šprem, Nikica (July 2012). "Threatened fishes of the world: Salmo obtusirostris salonitana (Karaman, 1926) (Salmonidae)" (PDF). Croatian Journal of Fisheries. 70 (2): 61–64.
- Tomljanović, Tea (September 2014). "Endemska mekousna pastrva solinka (Salmo obtusirostris salonitana)" [Endemic softmouth trout solinka (Salmo obtusirostris salonitana)] (PDF). Tusculum (in Croatian). 7 (1): 215–224.
