= Salmo cenerinus =

Conservation status
- Data Deficient (IUCN 3.1)

Scientific classification
- Kingdom: Animalia
- Phylum: Chordata
- Class: Actinopterygii
- Order: Salmoniformes
- Family: Salmonidae
- Genus: Salmo
- Species: S. cenerinus

Binomial name
- Salmo cenerinus Kottelat, 1997

Species of fish

Salmo cenerinus is a species of fish from the family of Salmonidae, in northern Italy from the Po to the Isonzo and on the northern slope of the Apennines. The species was introduced to different waters outside their original distribution area, to which may also include the Isonzo area. In various places it has probably hybridized with introduced trout (Salmo trutta).

== Description ==
Salmo cenerinus in lakes grows to 80 centimeters and in rivers to only 40 centimeters body length. Black and dark brown, and red spots are present all over the body. The caudal fin is slightly indented.

== Lifecycle ==
The species colonized clear, fast-flowing and well-aerated streams in the hill country, and subalpine and alpine lakes, with two different morphs occur ("trout" and "lake trout"). As a food serve aquatic insects and other invertebrates, large individuals also prey on fish. The spawning period is dependent on altitude and temperature and is from November to February. Eggs are laid in smaller tributaries on gravel base. Males become sexually mature at two, with females three years, the maximum age is at least eight years.
