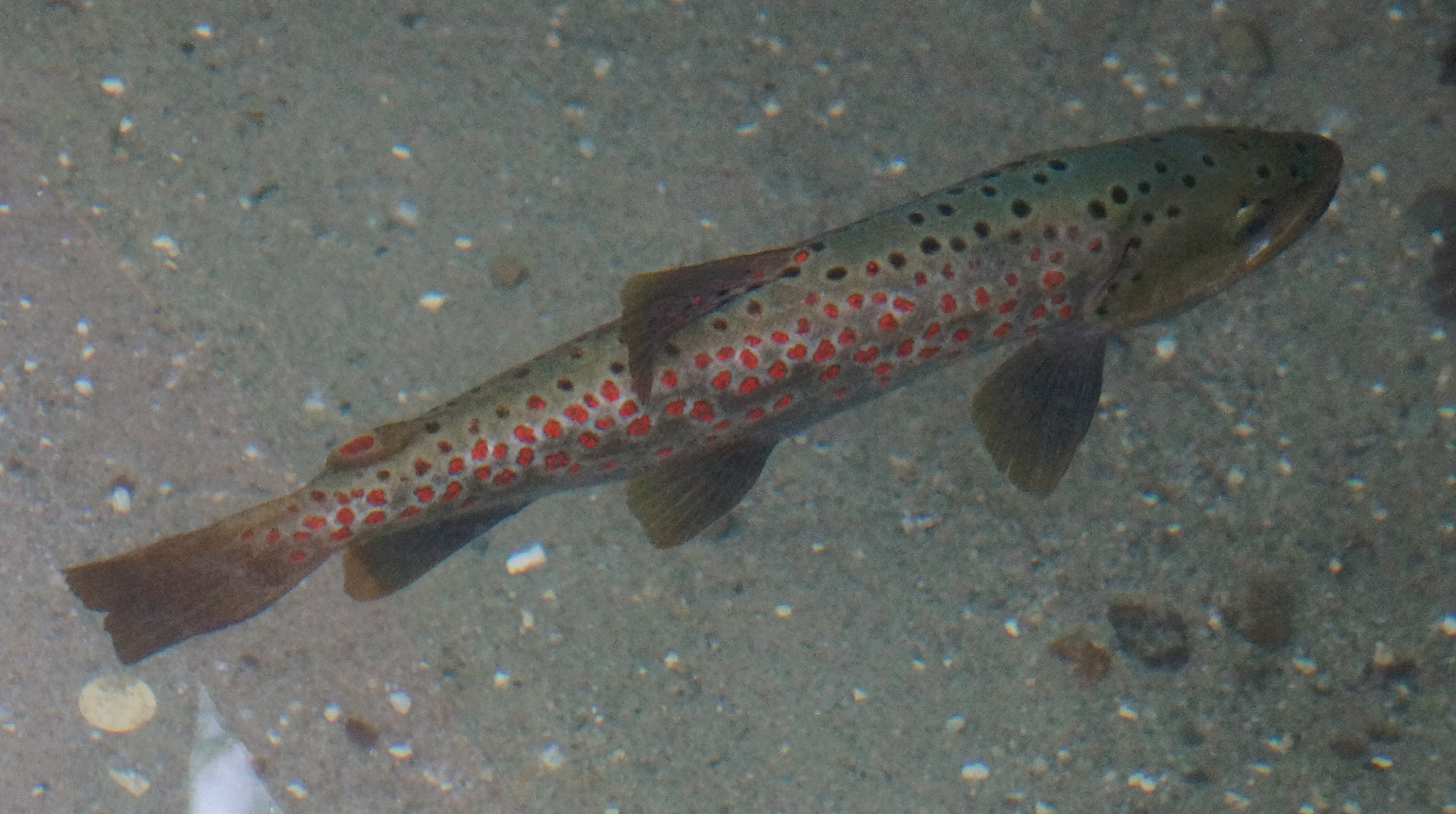

Conservation status
- Endangered (IUCN 3.1)

Scientific classification
- Kingdom: Animalia
- Phylum: Chordata
- Class: Actinopterygii
- Order: Salmoniformes
- Family: Salmonidae
- Genus: Salmo
- Species: S. letnica

Binomial name
- Salmo letnica (S. Karaman, 1924)

= Ohrid trout =

Species of fish

Ohrid trout or the Lake Ohrid brown trout (Salmo letnica) is an endemic species of trout in Lake Ohrid and in its tributaries and outlet, the Black Drin river, in North Macedonia and Albania. Locally, the fish is known as охридска пастрмка (ohridska pastrmka) in Macedonian and Koran or Korani in Albanian.

== Taxonomy ==
Ohrid trout is part of the brown trout complex, so its taxonomic status is controversial. It has, however, been deemed to be genetically sufficiently distinct to be regarded as a distinct species for conservation arguments.

=== Subdivision of the Ohrid trout ===
Within the Ohrid trout, up to four intralacustrine forms have been separated, which are treated as distinct species in the FishBase and by the IUCN. Morphological or molecular data so far do not support this division, though. These forms are characterized by different breeding areas and different breeding times, by which they are thought to be reproductively isolated from each other. The four forms or species include:

- Salmo balcanicus breeds in the outlet of the lake in its northwest end, in October–January; it is possibly extinct.
- Salmo lumi breeds in January–February in the tributaries of the lake.
- Salmo aphelios breeds in May–July near springs of the eastern shore of the lake.
- Salmo letnica breeds in January–February.

In addition to the Ohrid trout, Lake Ohrid has another endemic and truly distinct salmonid, Salmo ohridanus.

== Fisheries and gastronomy ==
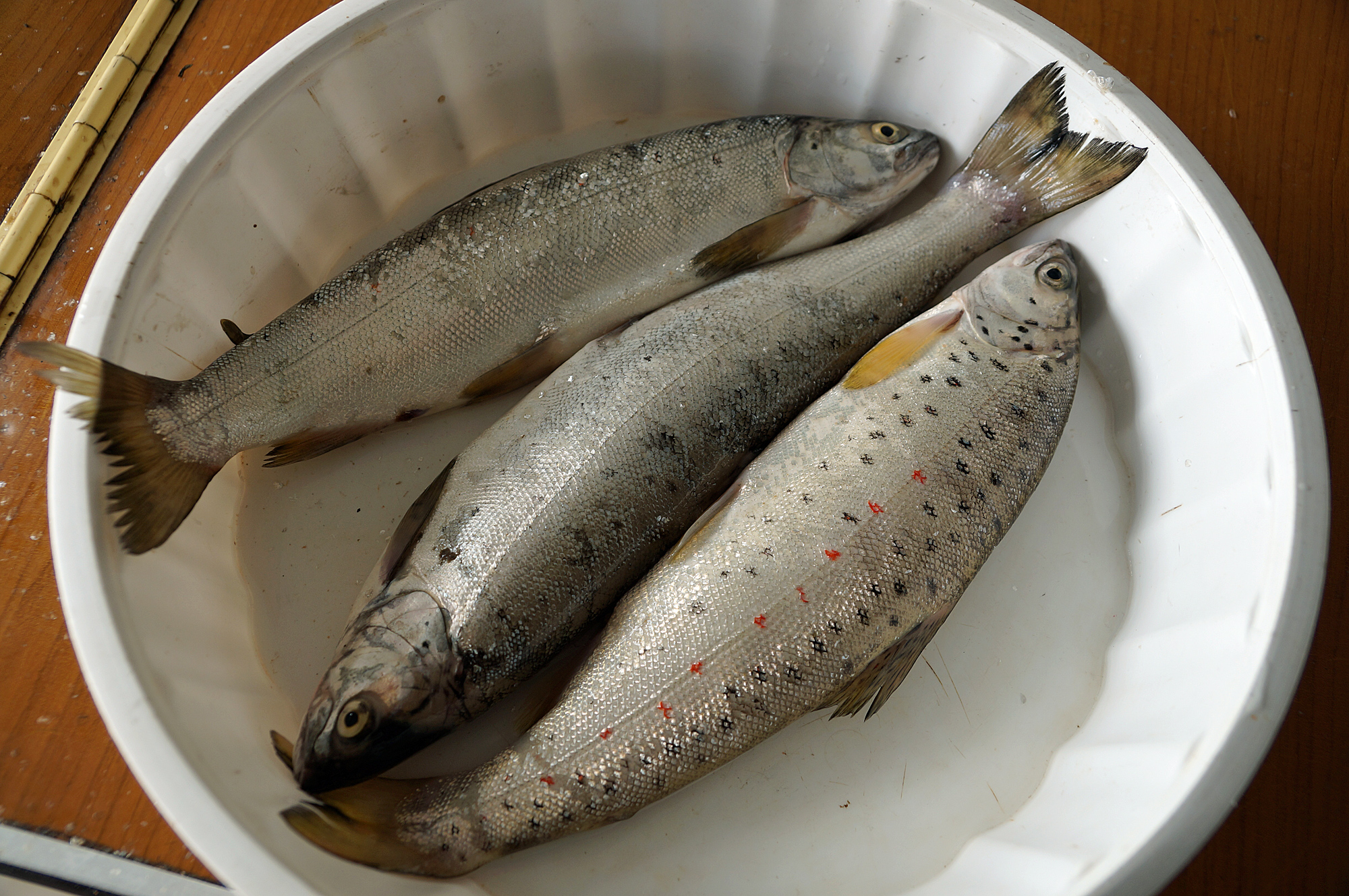
Ohrid Trouts in a fish shop in Pogradec, Albania

The Ohrid trout is a specialty in Macedonian and Albanian gastronomy; it is used for soups and other dishes. It tastes like a brown trout crossed with an Atlantic salmon.

In recent years, extensive fishing has driven the Ohrid trout to the verge of extinction, though several conservation activities are going on. A fishing ban has been imposed by the government of Macedonia, since 2004 and until 2014. In Albania, since 2003, the state law on fisheries prohibits fishing during the spawning period only, but no restrictions exist for the rest of the year, and the fish population is still dwindling due to illegal fishing and overfishing.

The Ohrid trout is depicted on the reverse of the Macedonian 2 denars coin, issued in 1993.

== Introduction outside of their natural range ==
=== Vlasina Lake ===
The Ohrid trout has been successfully translocated to and bred in the Vlasina Lake in Serbia, during the 1950s and 1960s; their current population status is unknown. The first lots of Ohrid trout were introduced in the newly formed Vlasina reservoir in 1953, when around 500,000 fish were transferred. The Ohrid trout was the dominant species in the lake at the time, but then lost its position during the 1980s, because the breeding program was discontinued, and because of failure of natural spawning due to water level variations related to working schedules of the hydroelectric plant, Vrla. Some fish still spawn successfully in the flooded tributaries of the lake. During the 1990s, bleak (Alburnus alburnus) and roach (Rutilus rutilus) from Lake Ohrid were introduced into Vlasina as food for the Ohrid trout. Also a yearly program of artificial spawning and conservation efforts started.

=== Introduction to Americas ===
As stated in a report by the U.S. Geological Survey (USGS), the Ohrid trout was stocked in Parvin Lake, Big Creek Reservoir, and Turquoise Lake in Colorado, in 1969; seven lakes in northern Minnesota, including Strawberry Lake, Chester Lake, and Big Trout Lake; an unspecified locality in Montana; Watauga Lake Reservoir and South Holston Reservoir in Tennessee; and a few reservoirs in Wyoming, including Viva Naughton Reservoir on the Green River, lakes near Casper, and the North Platte River.

The USGS report states that the trout was brought into the United States by the U.S. Fish and Wildlife Service and shipped to a federal hatchery in Iowa and a state hatchery in Minnesota. The eggs from Yugoslavia were hatched in the United States; young fish were released into several small lakes in northern Minnesota in 1968 and 1969. The species was first stocked in Colorado in 1969. Introductions into most of these states failed. They have been repeatedly stocked in Tennessee since 1971 with no evidence of reproduction yet, though spawning has been observed.
