= Salmo aphelios =

Conservation status
- Endangered (IUCN 3.1)

Scientific classification
- Kingdom: Animalia
- Phylum: Chordata
- Class: Actinopterygii
- Order: Salmoniformes
- Family: Salmonidae
- Genus: Salmo
- Species: S. aphelios

Binomial name
- Salmo aphelios Kottelat, 1997

Species of fish

Salmo aphelios is a species of trout, a salmonid fish endemic to Lake Ohrid in North Macedonia and Albania in the Balkans.

Salmo aphelios is one of four different forms of the Ohrid trout complex within the single lake, along with S. balcanicus, S. letnica, and S. lumi. The various trout forms, which have been suggested to be different species, are distinguished by their breeding time and habitat, by which they in practice are thought to be reproductively isolated from each other. Genetic data have not supported their distinction, though.

Salmo aphelios specifically spawns from May to July near the underwater springs on the eastern shore of the lake, at the Macedonian-Albanian border area. Its flesh is typically of orange colour. Overall, the Ohrid trouts are silvery in colour, with black dots. Red dots occur along the lateral line. S. aphelios can grow to 40 cm (16 in) long.
