= Salmo rhodanensis =

Conservation status
- Data Deficient (IUCN 3.1)

Scientific classification
- Kingdom: Animalia
- Phylum: Chordata
- Class: Actinopterygii
- Order: Salmoniformes
- Family: Salmonidae
- Genus: Salmo
- Species: S. rhodanensis

Binomial name
- Salmo rhodanensis Fowler, 1974

Species of fish

Salmo rhodanensis, or the Rhône trout, is a salmonid fish, a putative species of trout resident in the Rhône river drainage in France and Switzerland. It was previously considered as belonging to Salmo trutta. Salmo rhodanensis is an exclusively freshwater fish, and is uniquely characterized by four broad black bars on its body: behind gill opening, under dorsal base, above anal fin origin, and at the base of the tail.

The species is currently threatened by hybridization with the actual Salmo trutta that has been introduced by stocking to the same drainage. Pure, non-introgressed populations of the Rhône trout are actually not known.
