= Salmo =

Salmo Temporal range: Middle Miocene to present
- Atlantic salmon
- Brown trout

Scientific classification
- Kingdom: Animalia
- Phylum: Chordata
- Class: Actinopterygii
- Division: Teleostei
- Order: Salmoniformes
- Family: Salmonidae
- Subfamily: Salmoninae
- Genus: Salmo; Linnaeus, 1758

Type species
- Salmo salar Linnaeus, 1758

Synonyms
- Acantholingua Hadzisce, 1960; Fario Valenciennes, 1848; Salar Valenciennes, 1848; Salmono; Salmothymus Berg, 1908; Trutta Garsault, 1764

Genus of fishes

Salmo is a genus of ray-finned fish from the subfamily Salmoninae of family Salmonidae, and is part of the tribe Salmonini along with the sister genera Salvelinus and Salvethymus. Almost all Salmo species are native only in the Old World (including most of Europe, coastal North Africa and part of West Asia around the Black Sea), the only exception being the Atlantic salmon (Salmo salar), which is also naturally found across the North Atlantic in eastern North America.

The number of distinct species and subspecies in Salmo is a debated issue. The Atlantic salmon and brown trout (Salmo trutta) are widespread species and have been introduced worldwide as farmed food fish or recreational game fish, while most of the other Salmo species are narrowly distributed forms endemic to single watersheds.

The name Salmo derives from the Latin salmō, meaning salmon. The vast majority of the Salmo species have trout as their common name, except the Atlantic salmon, which along with six Pacific species from the genus Oncorhynchus (also from the subfamily Salmoninae, but of a different tribe) constitute the only seven officially recognized species of salmon.

Only two fossil species are known: †Salmo immigratus Gorjanovic-Kramberger, 1891 from the Miocene of Croatia, and †Salmo derzhavini Vladimirov, 1946 from the late Pliocene of Armenia. S. immigratus was initially dated to the Late Miocene, though more recent analyses suggest that it may date to the Middle Miocene, or the regional Sarmatian stage. S. immigratus appears to be a basal member of the genus, while S. derzhavini represents the earliest known occurrence of the brown trout species complex.

== Species ==
The species currently listed in this genus are:

- Salmo abanticus Tortonese, 1954 (Lake Abant trout)
- Salmo akairos Delling & Doadrio, 2005 (Lake Ifni trout)
- Salmo aphelios Kottelat, 1997 (summer trout)
- Salmo balcanicus (S. L. Karaman, 1927) (Struga trout)
- Salmo baliki Turan, İsmail Aksu, Münevver Oral, Kaya, Bayçelebi, 2021
- Salmo carpio Linnaeus, 1758 (Lake Garda trout)
- Salmo caspius Kessler, 1877 (Caspian trout)
- Salmo cenerinus Nardo, 1847
- Salmo cettii Rafinesque, 1810 (Mediterranean trout)
- Salmo chilo Turan, Kottelat & Engin, 2012
- Salmo ciscaucasicus Dorofeeva, 1967 (Terek trout)
- Salmo coruhensis Turan, Kottelat & Engin, 2010 (Çoruh river trout)
- †Salmo derzhavini Vladimirov, 1946 (fossil; Late Pliocene)
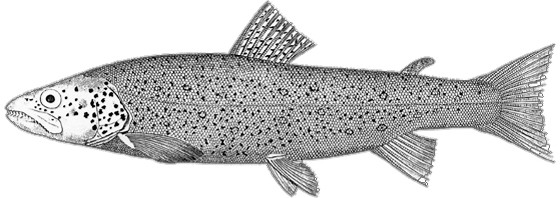
- Salmo dentex (Heckel, 1851) (Zubatak trout)
- Salmo euphrataeus Turan, Kottelat & Engin, 2014 (Euphrates trout)
- Salmo ezenami L. S. Berg, 1948 (Kezenoi-am trout)
- Salmo farioides S. L. Karaman, 1938 (Balkan brook trout)
- Salmo ferox Jardine, 1835 (Ferox trout)
- Salmo fibreni Zerunian & Gandolfi, 1990 (Fibreno trout)
- †Salmo immigratus Gorjanovic-Kramberger, 1891 (fossil; Middle Miocene)
- Salmo ischchan (Sevan trout)
  - †S. i. ischchan Kessler, 1877 (winter bakhtak)
  - S. i. aestivalis Fortunatov, 1926 (summer bakhtak)
  - S. i. gegarkuni Kessler, 1877 (gegharkuni)
  - †S. i. danilewskii Gulelmi, 1888 (bojak)
- Salmo kottelati Turan, Doğan, Kaya, & Kanyılmaz, 2014 (Alakir trout)
- Salmo labecula Turan, Kottelat & Engin, 2012
- Salmo labrax Pallas, 1814 (Black Sea trout)
- Salmo letnica (S. L. Karaman, 1924) (Pestani trout)
- Salmo lourosensis Delling, 2011 (Louros trout)
- Salmo lumi G. D. Poljakov, Filipi, Basho & Hysenaj, 1958 (Lumi trout)
- Salmo macedonicus (S. L. Karaman, 1924) (Macedonian trout)
- Salmo macrostigma (A. H. A. Duméril, 1858) (Maghreb trout)
- Salmo marmoratus G. Cuvier, 1829 (marble trout)
- Salmo montenigrinus (S. L. Karaman, 1933) (Montenegro trout)
- Salmo multipunctatus Doadrio, Perea & Yahyaoui, 2015 (Draa trout)
- Salmo munzuricus Turan, Kottelat & Kaya, 2017
- Salmo nigripinnis Günther, 1866 (Sonaghen trout)
- Salmo obtusirostris (Heckel, 1851)
  - S. o. krkensis (S. L. Karaman, 1927) (Krka softmouth trout)
  - S. o. obtusirostris Heckel, 1851 (softmouth trout)
  - S. o. oxyrhynchus (Steindachner, 1882) (Neretva softmouth trout)
  - S. o. salonitana (S. L. Karaman, 1927) (Jadro softmouth trout)
  - S. o. zetenzis (Hadžišče, 1961) (Zeta softmouth trout)
- Salmo ohridanus Steindachner, 1892 (Ohrid trout)
- Salmo okumusi Turan, Kottelat & Engin, 2014 (Western Euphrates trout)
- Salmo opimus Turan, Kottelat & Engin, 2012
- †Salmo pallaryi Pellegrin, 1924 (Sidi Ali trout)
- Salmo pelagonicus S. L. Karaman, 1938 (Pelagonian trout)
- Salmo pellegrini F. Werner, 1931 (Tensift trout)
- Salmo peristericus S. L. Karaman, 1938 (Prespa trout)
- Salmo platycephalus Behnke, 1968 (flathead trout)
- Salmo rhodanensis Fowler, 1974 (Rhône trout)
- Salmo rizeensis Turan, Kottelat & Engin, 2010 (Rize River trout)
- Salmo salar Linnaeus, 1758 (Atlantic salmon)
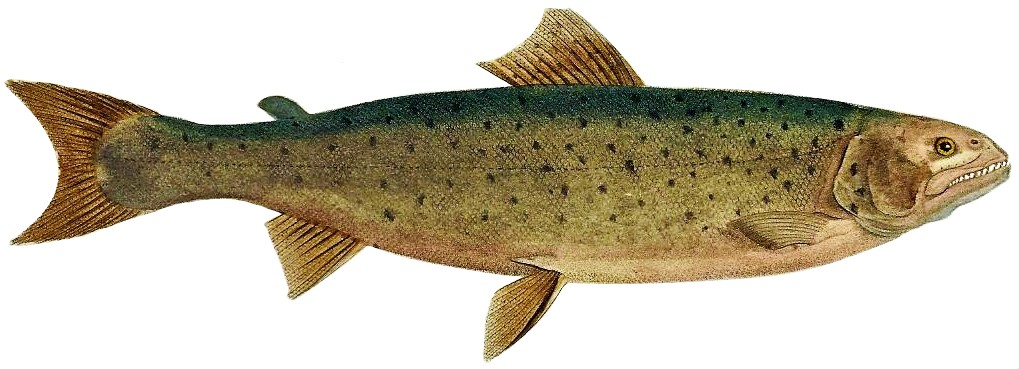
- †Salmo schiefermuelleri Bloch, 1784 (Austrian Lakes trout)
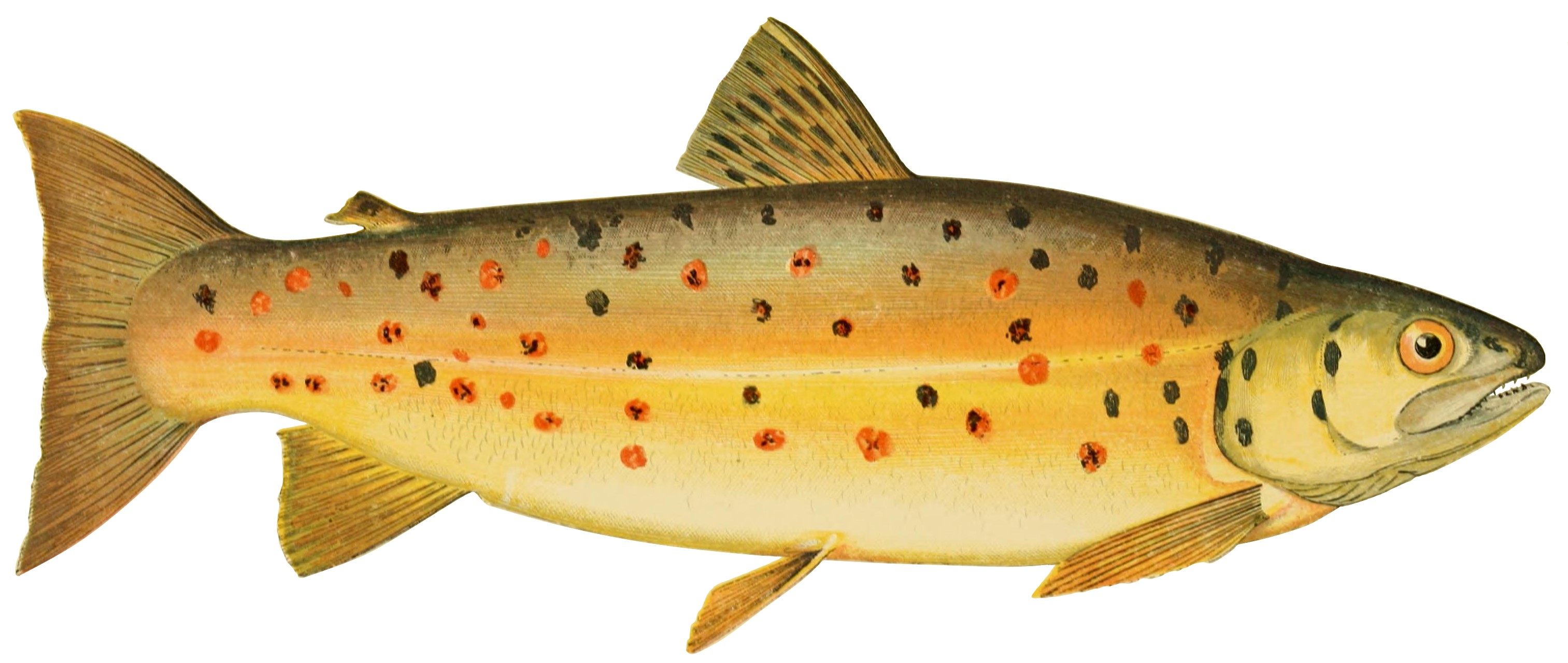
- Salmo stomachicus Günther, 1866 (Gillaroo trout)
- Salmo taleri (S. L. Karaman, 1933) (Zeta trout)
- Salmo tigridis Turan, Kottelat & Bektaş, 2011 (Upper Tigris trout)
- Salmo trutta Linnaeus, 1758
  - S. t. aralensis L. S. Berg, 1908 (Aral trout)
  - S. t. fario Linnaeus, 1758 (brown trout)
  - S. t. lacustris Linnaeus, 1758 (lake trout)
  - S. t. oxianus Kessler, 1874 (Amu-Darya trout)
  - S. t. trutta Linnaeus, 1758 (sea trout)
- Salmo viridis Doadrio, Perea & Yahyaoui, 2015 (green trout)
- Salmo visovacensis Taler, 1950
- Salmo zrmanjaensis Karaman, 1938
