= Salmo platycephalus =

Conservation status
- Endangered (IUCN 3.1)

Scientific classification
- Kingdom: Animalia
- Phylum: Chordata
- Class: Actinopterygii
- Order: Salmoniformes
- Family: Salmonidae
- Genus: Salmo
- Species: S. platycephalus

Binomial name
- Salmo platycephalus Behnke, 1969

Species of fish

Salmo platycephalus, known as the flathead trout, Ala balik or the Turkish trout, is a type of trout, a fish in the family Salmonidae. It is endemic to southeastern Turkey. It is known only from one population, which occupies three streams, tributaries of the Zamantı River in the Seyhan River basin. The population itself is abundant, but subject to threat by habitat loss, since the range is small. Also, predation of juveniles by introduced rainbow trout may cause population decline. The species is classified as critically endangered.

The flathead trout feeds on the abundant mayfly and caddis species present in the Zamanti River. Scuds, a small crustacean, also provide a nutrient rich source of food in the abundant vegetation found within the river.

Genetic evidence suggests that the flathead trout may indeed be derived from introduced brown trout (Salmo trutta) and thus not be a distinct species of its own. Nevertheless, it is a unique form which requires protection.

== Literature ==
- Behnke, R.J. 1968. A new subgenus and species of trout, Salmo (Platysalmo) platycephalus, from south-central Turkey, with comments on the classification of the subfamily Salmoninae. Mitt. Hamburg Zool. Mus. Inst. 66: 1–15.
