= Salmo lumi =

Conservation status
- Endangered (IUCN 3.1)

Scientific classification
- Kingdom: Animalia
- Phylum: Chordata
- Class: Actinopterygii
- Order: Salmoniformes
- Family: Salmonidae
- Genus: Salmo
- Species: S. lumi

Binomial name
- Salmo lumi G. D. Poljakov, Filipi, Basho & Hysenaj, 1958

Species of fish

Salmo lumi is a type of trout, a fish in the family Salmonidae. It is endemic to Lake Ohrid and its tributaries in Albania and North Macedonia.

Salmo lumi is one of four different forms of the Ohrid trout complex within Lake Ohrid, along with Salmo letnica, Salmo balcanicus and Salmo aphelios. There are however no known morphological characters that would clearly distinguish it from the others. The head and body of these trout are silver in colour, with black dots. Red dots occur along the lateral line. Salmo lumi can grow to 38 cm (15 in) length.

The various trout of Ohrid are distinguished by their breeding time and habitat, and they are thus in practice reproductively isolated from each other. Salmo lumi specifically spawns from January to February in the tributaries of the lake. In the lake it lives at 60–80 m (200–260 ft) depths. Its status as a distinct species is not yet confirmed by molecular methods.
