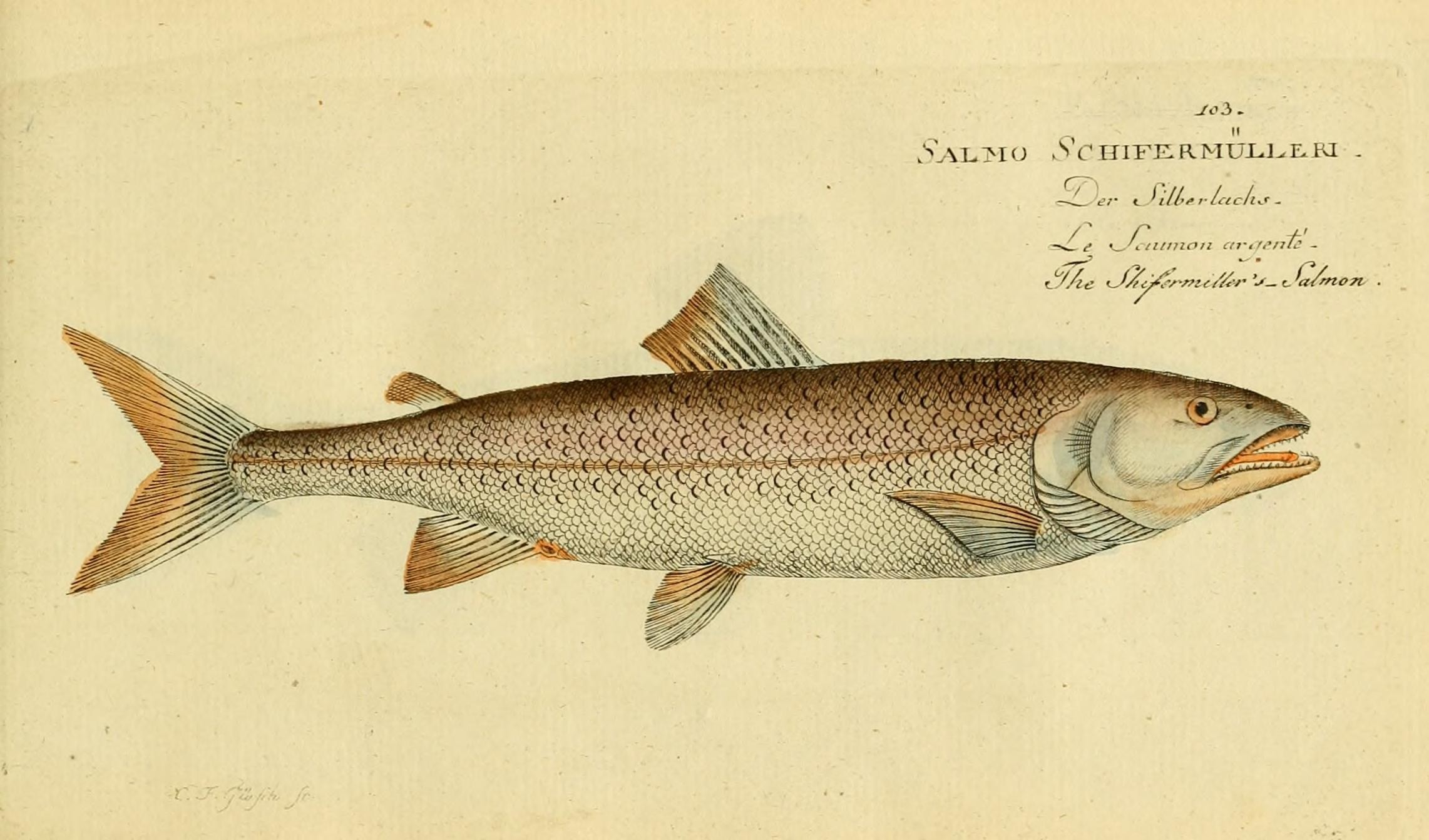

Conservation status
- Extinct (last seen in the 19th century) (IUCN 3.1)

Scientific classification
- Kingdom: Animalia
- Phylum: Chordata
- Class: Actinopterygii
- Order: Salmoniformes
- Family: Salmonidae
- Genus: Salmo
- Species: †S. schiefermuelleri

Binomial name
- †Salmo schiefermuelleri Bloch, 1784

= Salmo schiefermuelleri =

Species of fish

Salmo schiefermuelleri is a designation for populations of trout in some subalpine lakes of Austria, whose taxonomical status is however unclear and which are suspected to be extinct.

In their Handbook of European Freshwater Fishes (2007) and in the IUCN Red List, the ichthyologists Kottelat and Freyhof took up this name to refer to legendary fishes called Maiforelle that live in deep parts of Austrian lakes of the Danube basin and only appear in May to breed in shallow water. Only stories in literature of these fishes are known and it is unclear whether or not they are extinct. Similar populations of trout have been present elsewhere in the alpine region, e.g. in Switzerland, and they were initially included in the definition of Salmo schiefermuelleri Bloch, 1784. The currently suggested definition however does not apply to fishes in other drainages than Danube, particularly lakes Attersee, Traunsee and Fuschlsee. The fish is listed as Data Deficient Until 2024, while its taxonomy and survival are in doubt., it is declared extinct By The IUCN Red List of Threatened Species In 2024
