= Jadro =

Watercourse in Dalmatia, Croatia

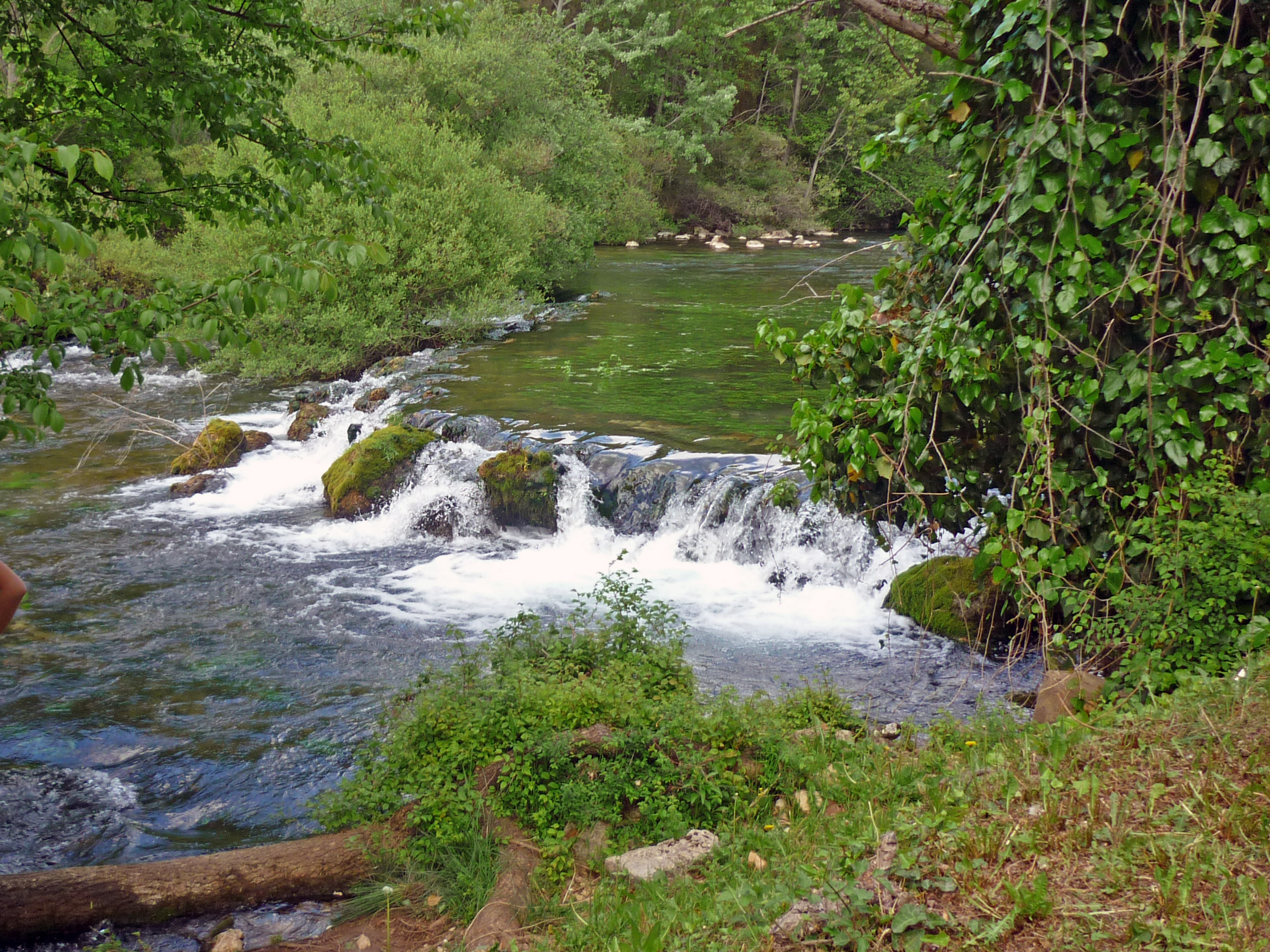
- Jadro near Solin

Location
- Country: Croatia

Physical characteristics
- Mouth
  - location: Adriatic Sea
  - coordinates: 43.5347°N 16.4757°E
- Length: 4.5 km (2.8 mi)

The Jadro is a watercourse in Dalmatia, Croatia, that discharges into the Adriatic Sea. The upper reaches of the Jadro River, as well as its source, Jadro Spring, are protected as an ichthyological nature reserve, partly due to the presence of an endemic species of soft-mouthed trout. The headwaters of the Jadro River were the original water supply for the ancient city comprised by Diocletian's Palace (now an area within the present day city of Split). Contemporary studies indicate favourable water quality levels of the river near the headwaters at Jadro Spring.

The Jadro flows through the town of Solin and has a length of approximately four kilometres' moreover, the river provides water to the cities of Split, Kaštela and Trogir as well as of municipalities Podstrana, Klis, Seget and Okrug. Incompliances with the regulations related to water for consumption occasionally appear due to turbidity caused by abundant precipitation.

People from Solin also call it Solinska rika (Croatian for "Solin's river").

Salmo obtusirostris salonitana is an endemic trout species living in this river, which is currently endangered by the rainbow trout.

== Bibliography ==
- Tomljanović, Tea (September 2014). "Endemska mekousna pastrva solinka (Salmo obtusirostris salonitana)" [Endemic softmouth trout solinka (Salmo obtusirostris salonitana)] (PDF). Tusculum (in Croatian). 7 (1): 215–224.
