= Dades trout =

Scientific classification
- Kingdom: Animalia
- Phylum: Chordata
- Class: Actinopterygii
- Division: Teleostei
- Order: Salmoniformes
- Family: Salmonidae
- Genus: Salmo
- Species: S. multipunctatus

Binomial name
- Salmo multipunctatus Doadrio, Perea & Yahyaoui, 2015

Synonyms
- Salmo multipunctata Doadrio, Perea & Yahyaoui, 2015

Species of ray-finned fish

The Dades trout (Salmo multipunctatus), also called the Draa trout, is a species of ray-finned fish in the genus Salmo. It is known to inhabit the headwater tributaries of the Draa River system in Morocco. It was originally thought that the Dades trout was of the Atlantic lineage, like the other trout of Morocco, but after genetic testing it was revealed that it was its own distinct lineage, one that is considered extremely basal. It is known for having profuse spotting across its entire body. These spots are mostly black, with the occasional red dots mixed throughout.
