= Nestos =

Nestos may refer to:

- Nestos (municipality), a municipality in Greece
- Nestos (river), a river in Bulgaria and Greece
- Nestos Chrysoupoli F.C., a Greek football club
- Ragnvald Nestos (1877–1942), American politician
