= Podstrana =

Municipality in Split-Dalmatia County, Croatia

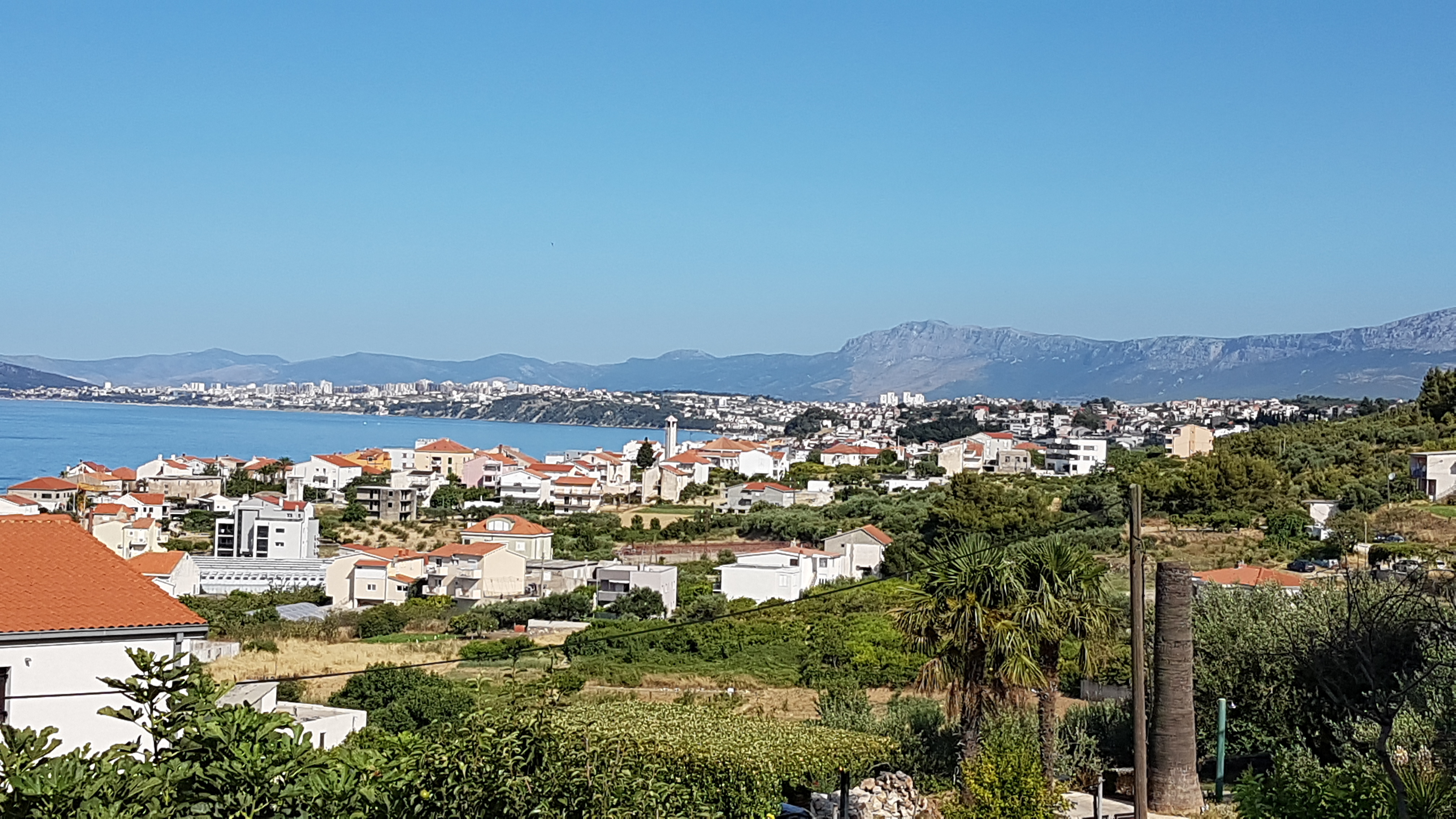

- Location within Croatia
- Coordinates: 43°28′48″N 16°34′48″E
- Country: Croatia
- Region: Dalmatia
- County: Split-Dalmatia County

Area
  - Total: 11.7 km^{2} (4.5 sq mi)

Population (2021)
  - Total: 10,403
  - Density: 889/km^{2} (2,300/sq mi)
- Time zone: UTC+1 (CET)
  - Summer (DST): UTC+2 (CEST)
- Postal code: 21312 Podstrana
- Area code: +385 (0)21
- Website: podstrana.hr

Podstrana is a municipality and a suburb of Split in the Split-Dalmatia County in Croatia. In 2011, it had a population of 9,129, of which 97% were Croats.

== Climate ==
Podstrana experiences a hot-summer Mediterranean climate (Köppen climate classification Csa) with extremely long periods of sunshine throughout the year.

Winter is mild, with a January average of 8 °C (46.4 °F). Snow is unknown.

Spring and fall (autumn) are considered ideal seasons for sightseeing and various outdoor activities.

Summers are very hot during the day, and hot in the summer nights.

== History ==
In the Second World War, the town suffered 131 casualties.

== Demographics ==
In 2021, the municipality had 10403 residents in the following 10 settlements:

- Gornja Podstrana, population 129
- Podstrana – Grbavac, population 807
- Podstrana – Grljevac, population 1523
- Podstrana – Miljevac, population 1092
- Podstrana – Mutogras, population 394
- Podstrana – Sita, population 2130
- Podstrana – Strožanac Donji, population 1687
- Podstrana – Strožanac Gornji, population 629
- Podstrana – Sv. Martin, population 991
- Podstrana – Žminjača, population 1021
Podstrana: Population trends 1857–2021
v

population	562	634	689	814	990	973	926	1175	912	958	933	1747	2798	5240	7341	9129	10403
	1857	1869	1880	1890	1900	1910	1921	1931	1948	1953	1961	1971	1981	1991	2001	2011	2021

Sources: Croatian Bureau of Statistics publications

== Economy ==
The fairly rural suburb is located c. 8 km away from downtown Split. Peach growing has been replaced by tourism, which is now the dominant sector. Le Méridien Lav, a five-star hotel is located within the municipality of Podstrana.

== See also ==
- Lucius Artorius Castus
