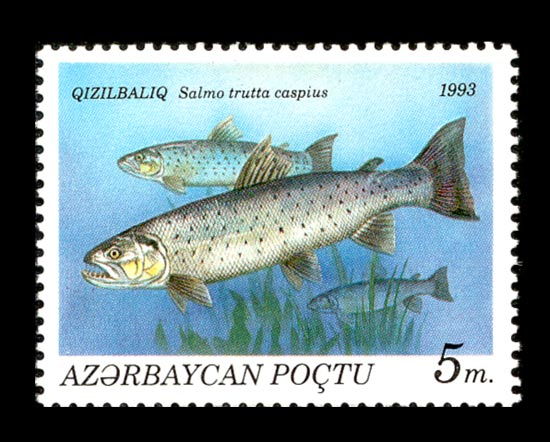
- The Caspian trout, depicted on a 1993 stamp from Azerbaijan as Salmo trutta caspius.

Scientific classification
- Kingdom: Animalia
- Phylum: Chordata
- Class: Actinopterygii
- Order: Salmoniformes
- Family: Salmonidae
- Genus: Salmo
- Species: S. caspius

Binomial name
- Salmo caspius Kessler, 1877

Synonyms
- Salmo trutta caspius

= Caspian trout =

Disputed species of fish

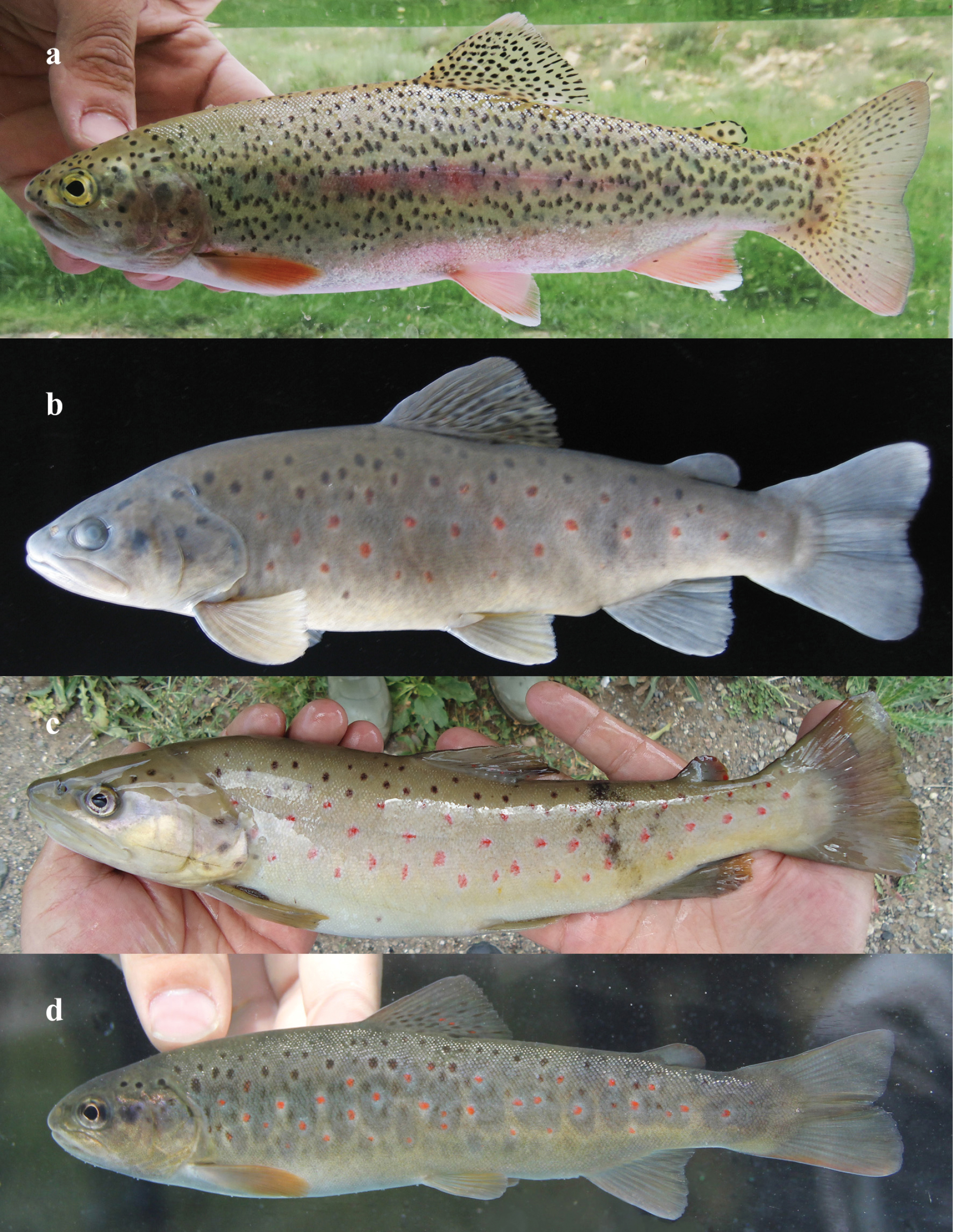
The fish labeled with the letter B in this figure is a specimen of S. caspius.

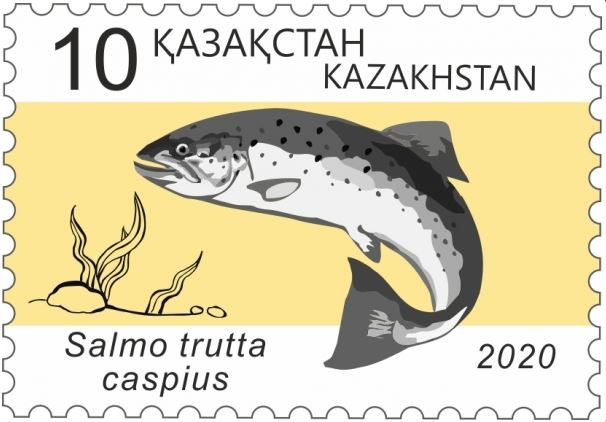
The Caspian trout, depicted on a 2020 stamp from Kazakhstan, also as Salmo trutta caspius.

The Caspian trout (Salmo caspius) is a disputed species of fish in the family Salmonidae. It is native to Eurasia, where it occurs only in the southern Caspian Sea basin. It reaches 25 cm (9.8 inches) in standard length. While historically considered a distinct species, recent evidence suggests that the Caspian trout, as well as the Black Sea salmon (Salmo labrax) and the Abant trout (Salmo abanticus) are not distinct species but are instead morphs of the brown trout (Salmo trutta).
