= Salmo macrostigma =

Conservation status
- Data Deficient (IUCN 3.1)

Scientific classification
- Kingdom: Animalia
- Phylum: Chordata
- Class: Actinopterygii
- Division: Teleostei
- Order: Salmoniformes
- Family: Salmonidae
- Genus: Salmo
- Species: S. macrostigma

Binomial name
- Salmo macrostigma (A. H. A. Duméril, 1858)

Synonyms
- Salar macrostigma A. H. A. Duméril, 1858; Salmo fario macrostigma (A. H. A. Duméril, 1858); Salmo trutta macrostigma (A. H. A. Duméril, 1858); Salmo lapasseti Zill, 1858; Salmo trutta pellegrini Werner, 1931

Species of fish

Salmo macrostigma, known as the Algerian trout, is a species of freshwater trout endemic to Algeria in northwest Africa. It can reach a length of 60 centimetres (24 in) TL.

The name Salmo trutta macrostigma (or Salmo macrostigma) has previously been used of many populations also in other regions around the Mediterranean, but in recent years those have been split into separate local species.
