= Upper Reka =

Subregion of the Reka region

Coordinates: 41°45′N 20°39′E

Extent of Upper Reka in the northwest part of North Macedonia, near the Kosovo and Albania borders

Upper Reka (Macedonian: Горна Река, romanized: Gorna Reka; Albanian: Reka e Epërme) is a geographic area and ethnographic subregion of the broader Reka region of western North Macedonia, including settlements within the upper left portion of the Municipality of Mavrovo and Rostuša and of Gostivar Municipality. The region historically is home to both a Muslim Albanian community and Christian Orthodox Albanian speaking population. In the modern period, Orthodox Upper Rekans self identify as Macedonians, and due to their migration from Upper Reka, the remaining population by the 2010s are Muslim Albanian Upper Rekans. Upper Reka is a mountainous and rugged region with animal grazing and highland pastures. In contemporary times, the largest inhabited settlement is the village of Vrbjani. Upper Reka is an isolated and underdeveloped region with limited communication links, whereby access and travel becomes difficult during the snowy winter months.

Historically Upper Reka inhabitants mainly engaged with agricultural and farming activities of which some of the remaining population continues to do. The region has experienced much depopulation over time due to seasonal or permanent migration to nearby regions and abroad in search of employment and better living standards. In the 14th century Upper Reka was part of the Lordship of Prilep, of the Mrnjavčević family, until 1395, when its territory was subjugated to Bayezid I of the Ottoman Empire under which it remained until the Balkan Wars of 1912-1913. Thereafter it became part of Kingdom of Serbia, the Kingdom of Yugoslavia, the Socialist Federal Republic of Yugoslavia, and eventually part of North Macedonia.

== Geography and Environment ==
=== Location ===
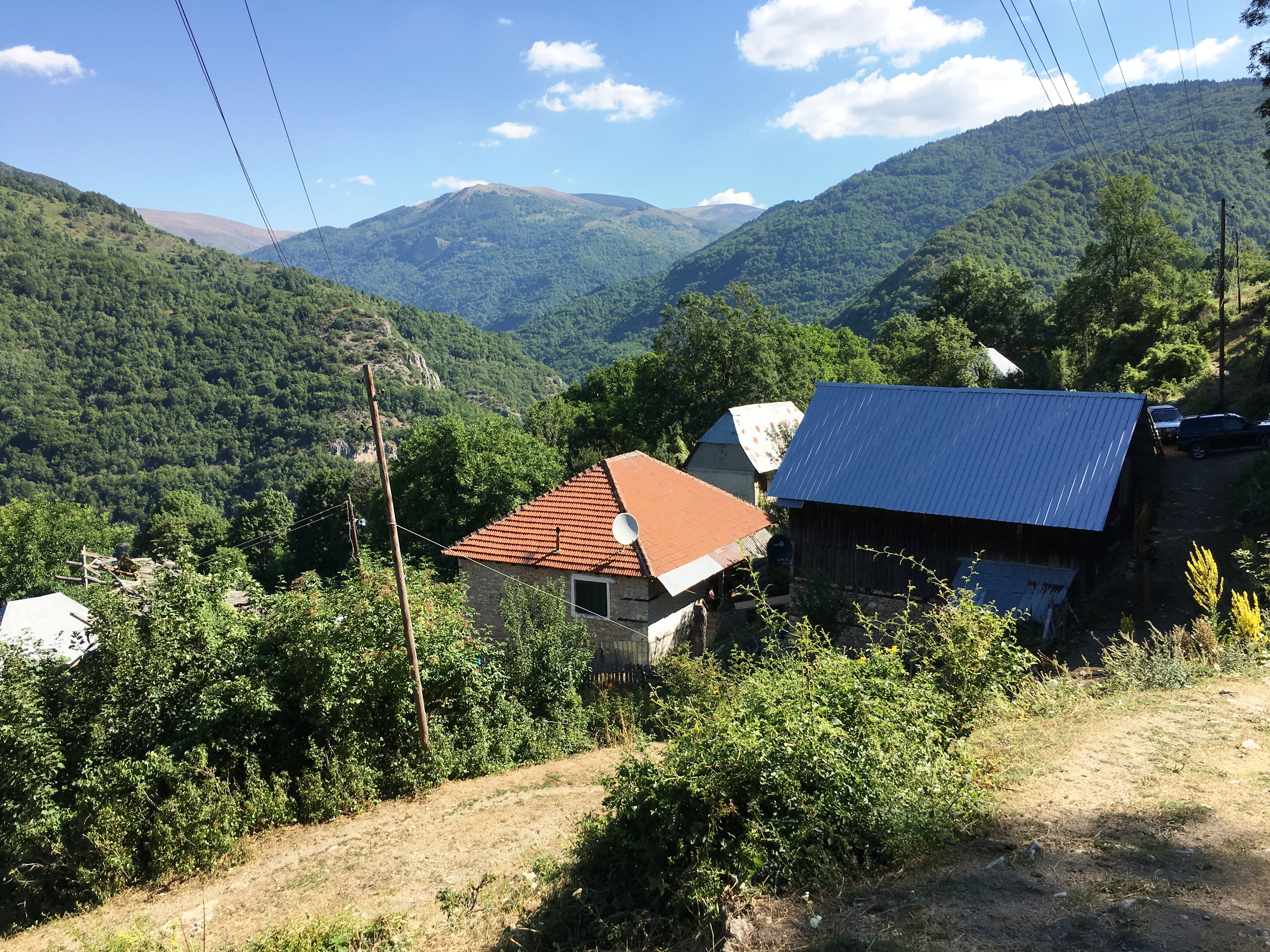
View from Volkovija of the slopes of Korab mountain and Radika river canyon

The broader Reka region is divided into Mala (small), Dolna (lower) and Golema (large) or Gorna (Upper) sub-regions (ethnographic/geographic regions). Upper Reka alongside the wider Reka region was also considered (and from an Albanian point of view still considered) to belong to the larger region of Dibra that encompasses multiple sub-regions centered around the town of Debar on both sides of the Albanian-Macedonian border.

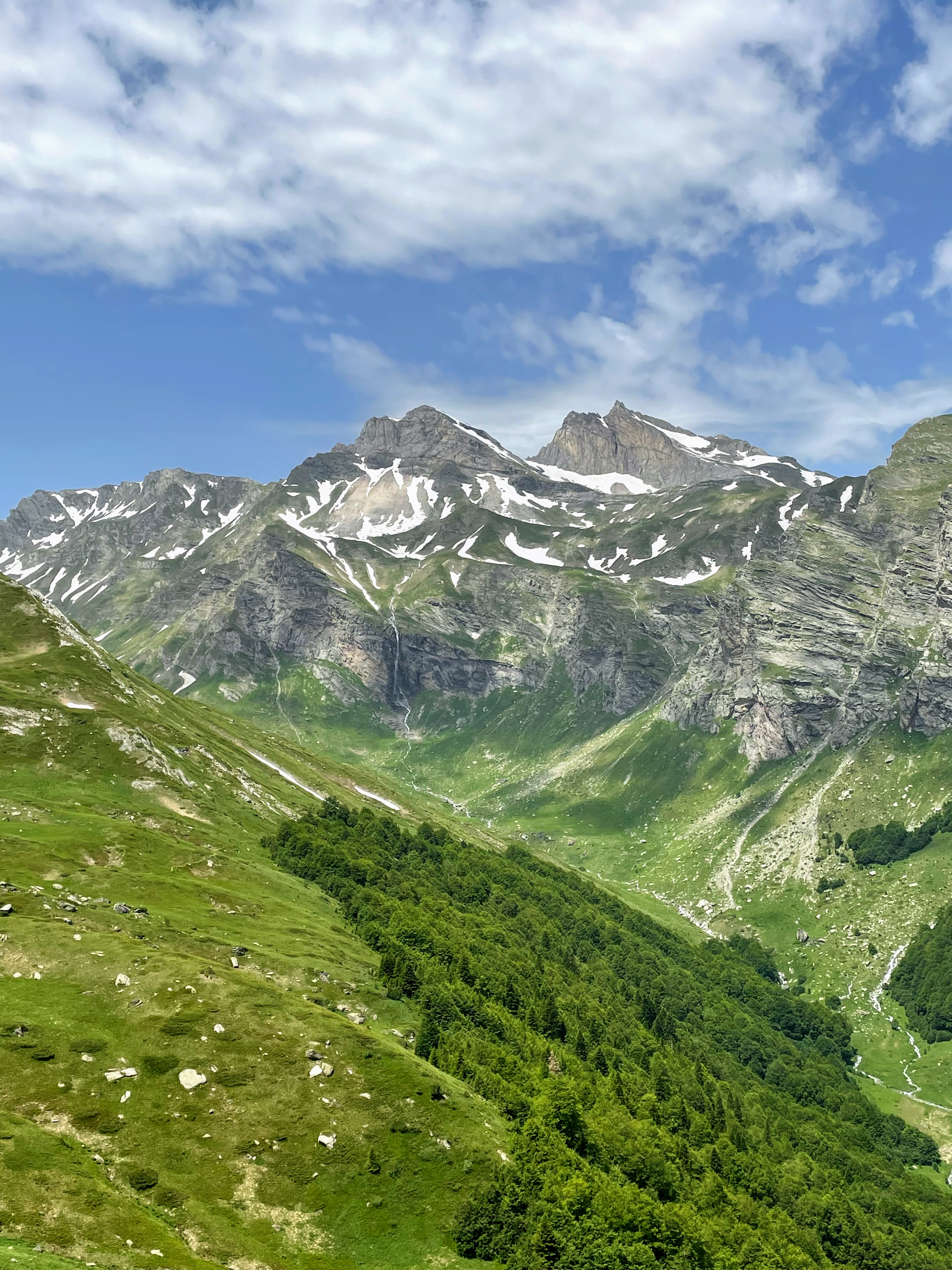
Korab Mountains and Dlaboka river valley

The region of Upper Reka is bordered by Kosovo to the north and by Albania in the west. It is a mountainous area with highland alpine pastures, situated at the northern end of the Radika river basin that continues on into Lower Reka all the way to the southern Boškov Bridge, near the area of Small Reka. Upper Reka's northern and northeastern territorial borders consist of the Vraca Mountains which are part of the wider Šar Mountains that extend nearby as the Ničpur Mountains with Lera peak at 2194 m. The northwest and western borders of Upper Reka go along the Korab Mountains with Golem Korab peak at 2753 m. A narrow pass at 1920 m above sea level, between the Korab and Šar Mountains exists that allows for communication and interaction with the ethnographic/geographic Gora region. Through this opening, located between the three point border mountain peak of Ksulje e Priftit at 2092 m and the Vraca Mountains is the most suitable communication link (consisting of an automobile road, pedestrian and mule paths) between the former village of Štirovica at the extreme northern end of Upper Reka and Restelica village at the southern edge of the Gora region in Kosovo.

The southern border of Upper Reka is on the right side within the valley of the river Radika. It is between the villages of Vrbjani in Upper Reka and Žirovnica in Lower Reka that are represented by geographical and communicative limitations presented by the imposing Korab Mountains. A road links both villages and is the main outlet for transitory communication between within the area that goes all the way to Debar. The eastern part of the southern border from the left side of the Radika river valley fully belongs to the Bistra Mountains with Medenica peak at 2163 m. An eastern road that intersects with the others at Volkovija village heads toward near Vrben village at Upper Reka's eastern limits. Onward that road continues toward to Mavrovi Anovi town and Mavrovo Lake and further on to Gostivar. Apart from the main Radika river, a series of tributaries that feed it are found throughout Upper Reka such as Dlaboka Reka (Albanian: Përroi i Thellë), Brodečka Reka (Ujë të Vaut, also Uji i Vaut), Ribnička Reka (Përroi i Rimnicës) and so on. Highland mountain alpine pastures used for livestock grazing by the local populace are found throughout the mountainous region such as Rečka Planina (Bjeshka e Reçit), Nistrovski Korab (Korabi i Nistrovës) and Ḱafa Kadis (Qafa e Kadisë). In total, the confines of the Upper Reka region covers an area of about 358.8 square kilometres (138.5 sq mi).

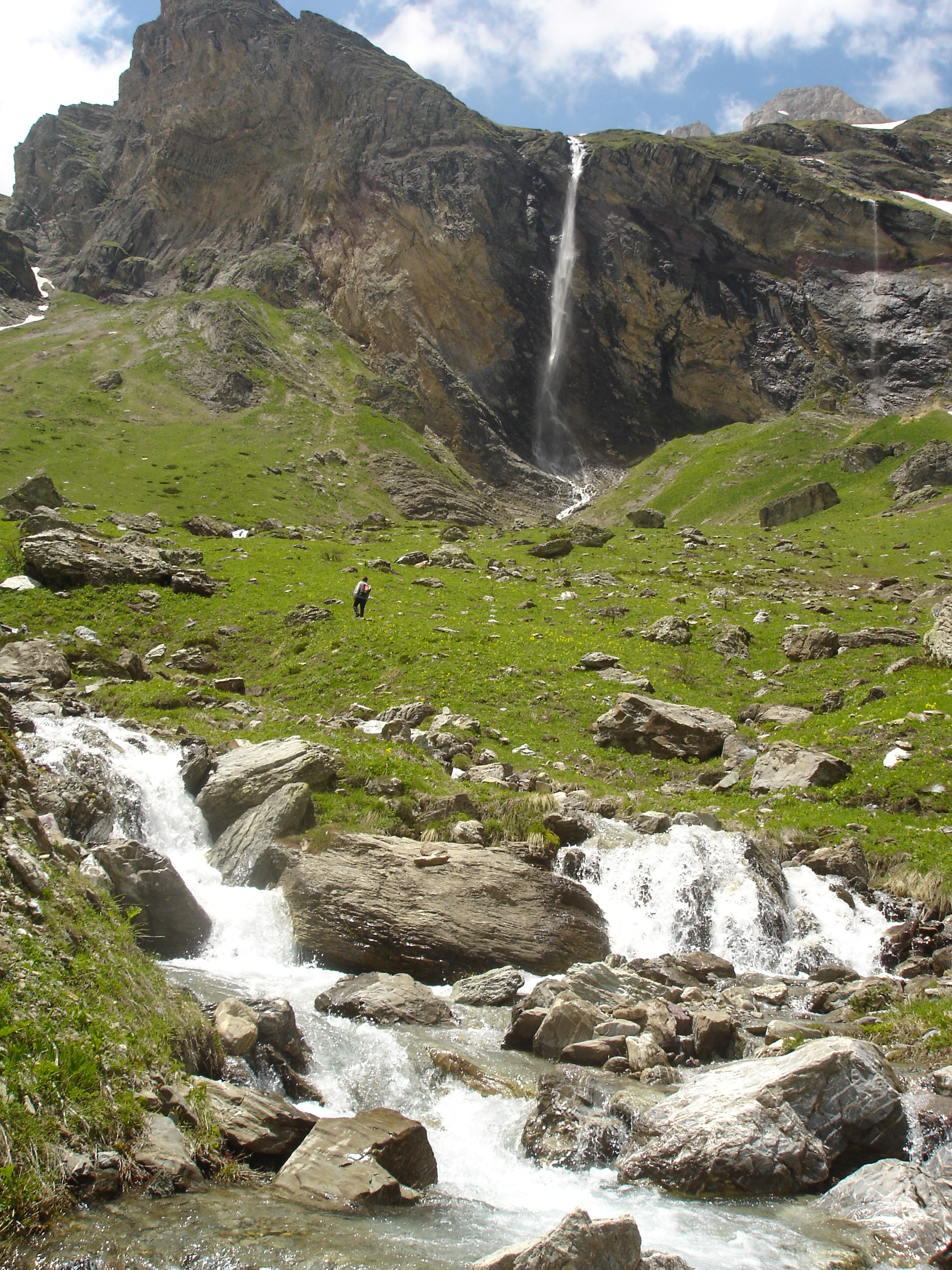
Dlaboka river and its waterfall in background

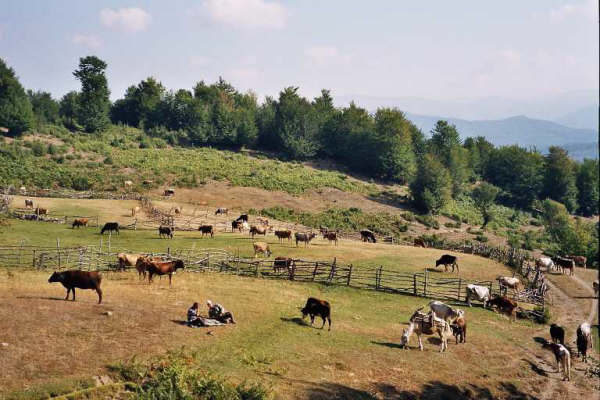
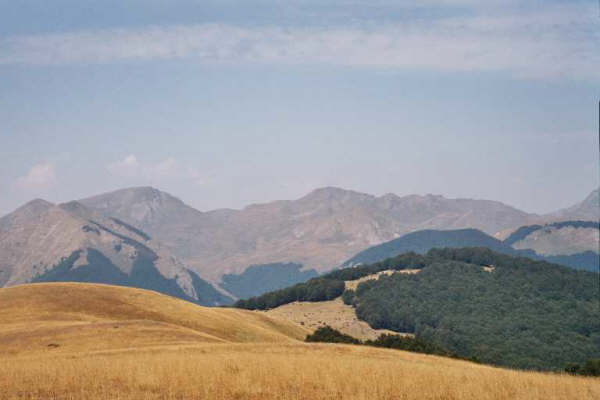
Upper Reka animal grazing and highland mountain pastures

=== Settlements ===
Upper Reka settlements within Mavrovo and Rostuša Municipality include Tanuše (Tanushaj), Nivište (Nivisht), Ribnica (Rimnicë), Žužnje (Zhuzhnjë), Nistrovo (Nistrovë), Ničpur (Niçpur), Volkovija (Vallkavi), Kičinica (Kiçinicë), Krakornica (Krakarnicë), Beličica (Beliçicë), Vrben (Vërben), Bogdevo (Bogdë), Sence (Sencë), Vrbjani (Vërbjan), Bibaj and Grekaj. Upper Reka settlements within Gostivar Municipality are Brodec (Va, definite form: Vau). Traditionally three other adjacent villages, Duf and Orḱuše (Orqushë) in Mavrovo and Rostuša Municipality and Gorno Jelovce (Jalloc i Epërm, also Jallofcë e Epërme) all within the neighboring Upper Polog region have at times also been considered belonging to Upper Reka, due to linguistic affiliations and cultural connections. Also due to uprisings in the Upper Reka region, former settlements such as: Trnica (Tërnicë), Reč (Reç), Dubovo (Dëbovë), Štirovica (Shtirovicë), Strezimir (Shtrezmir) and Zavojsko (Zavojskë) were burned down by Serbian and Bulgarian forces between 1912–1916.

=== Climate, fauna and wildlife ===
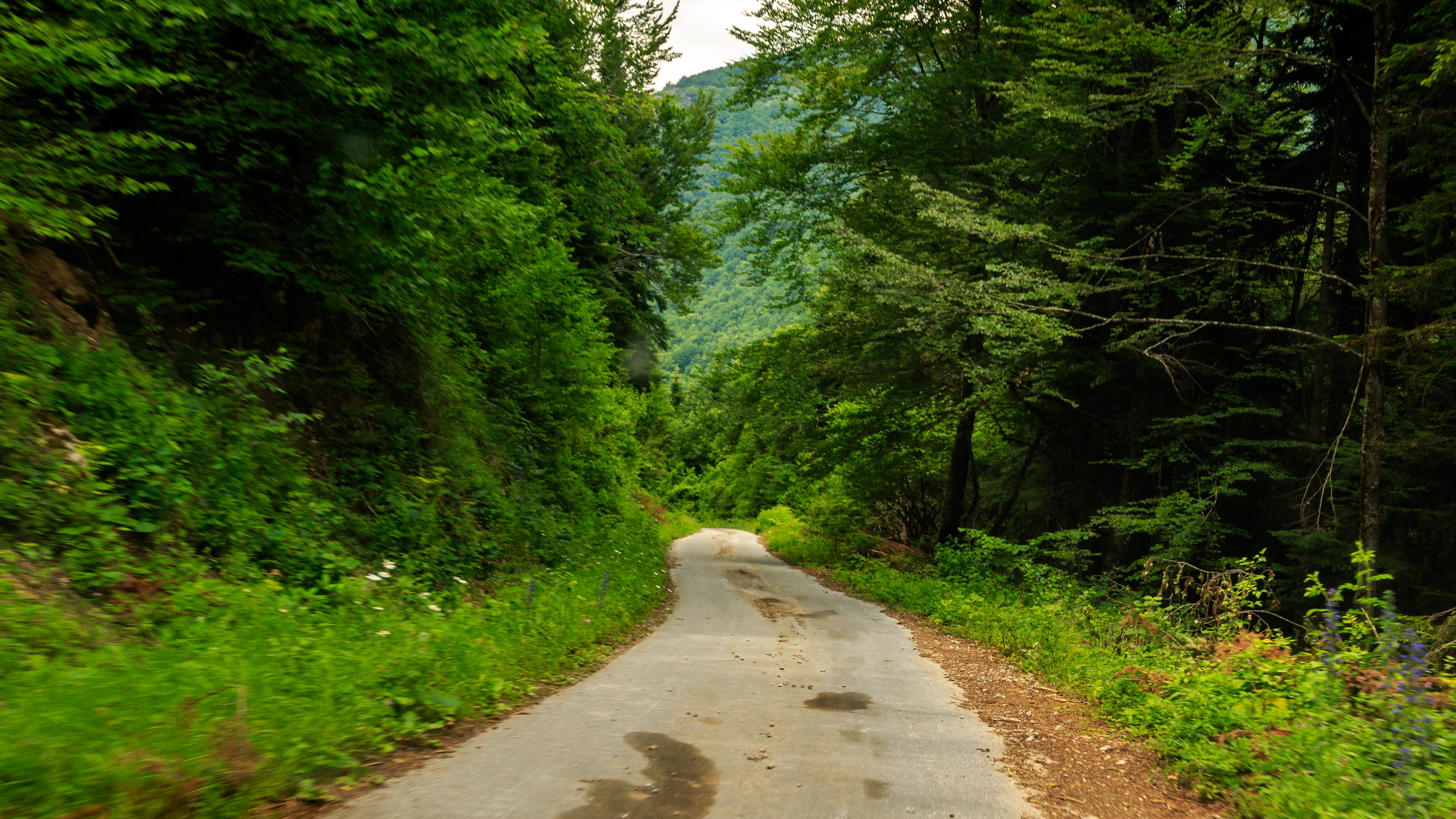
Road to Beličica village

The Upper Reka region is the only area within North Macedonia to have a cold Alpine climate. Due to the high altitude, the region is exposed to winds from various directions. From the east, the strong gusts of what Upper Reka locals refer to as era bardh, literally the white wind, the rain-bringing warm southeast wind ladas and the northwest wind heralding weather change called era poshtr or low wind. The region is exposed to thunderstorms mainly during summer, while rain, frost, hail and rainbows occur according to seasonal weather patterns. The winter season is often long and snowy and so too is the summer season, while spring and autumn seasons are short. Snow mostly appears in the region from the middle of autumn lasting until mid-spring. It recent times snow fall continues late into spring and even at times into early summer. Due to snow fall, Upper Reka becomes an isolated region as communication for most of the year with neighbouring areas is severely limited and even impassable such as that with Albania through the Korab Mountains. In past times, the population was forced during the short summer season to supply food grains, salt, beans and other food stuffs as snow made communications difficult between nearby villages and the outside world. Most of Upper Reka along with Dolna Reka is located within Mavrovo National Park. In the area of Upper Reka, parts of the region still contain virgin forests of old and unique species of Beech trees (Abies borisii-regis) especially around Dlaboka river and the northern part of the Radika river valley. Parts of Upper Reka forests were felled until the 1950s to create pastures for sheep grazing. Upper Reka is also home to the critically endangered subspecies of Eurasian lynx, the Balkan lynx (Lynx lynx balcanicus).

== Demographics ==
=== Population and Identity ===
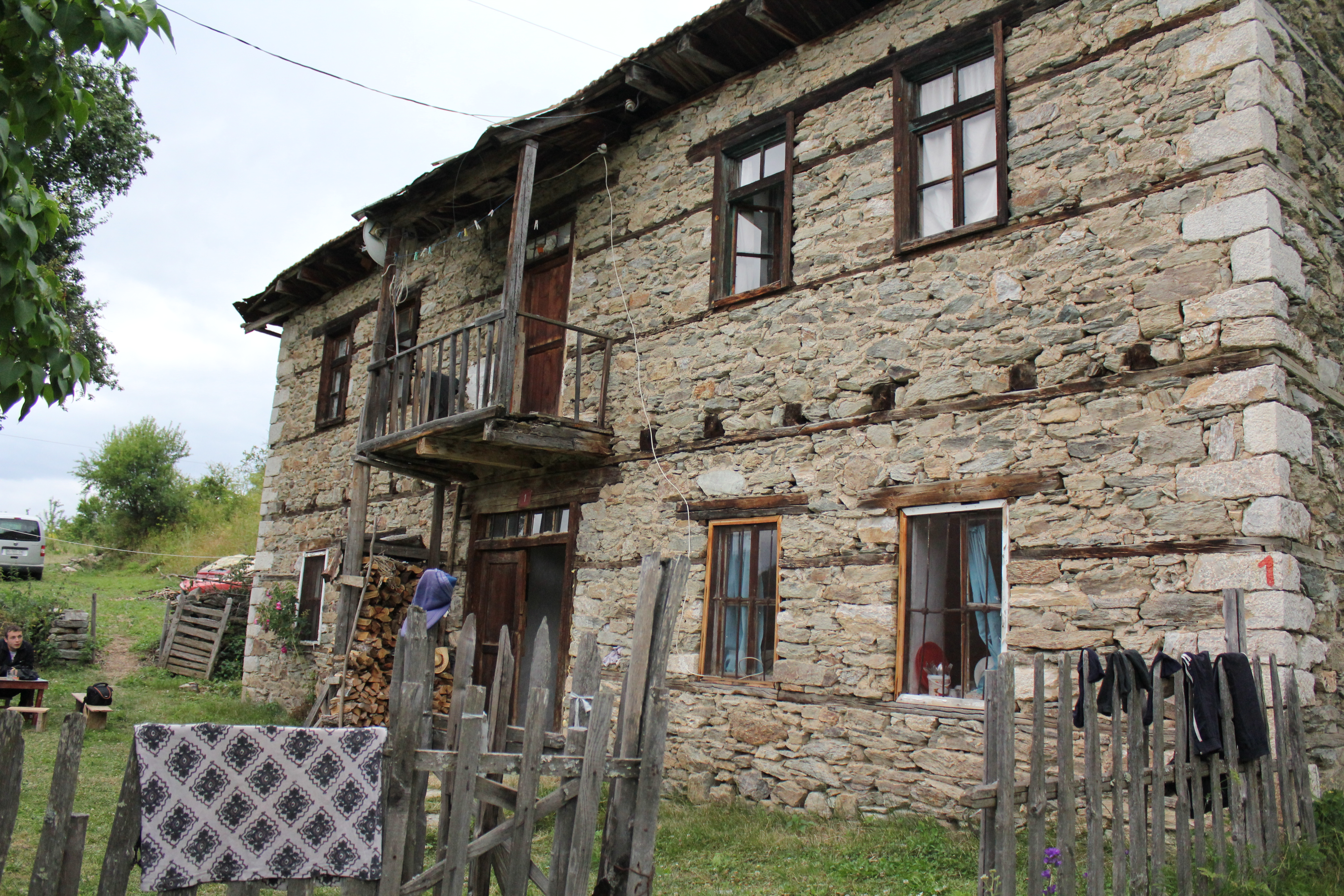
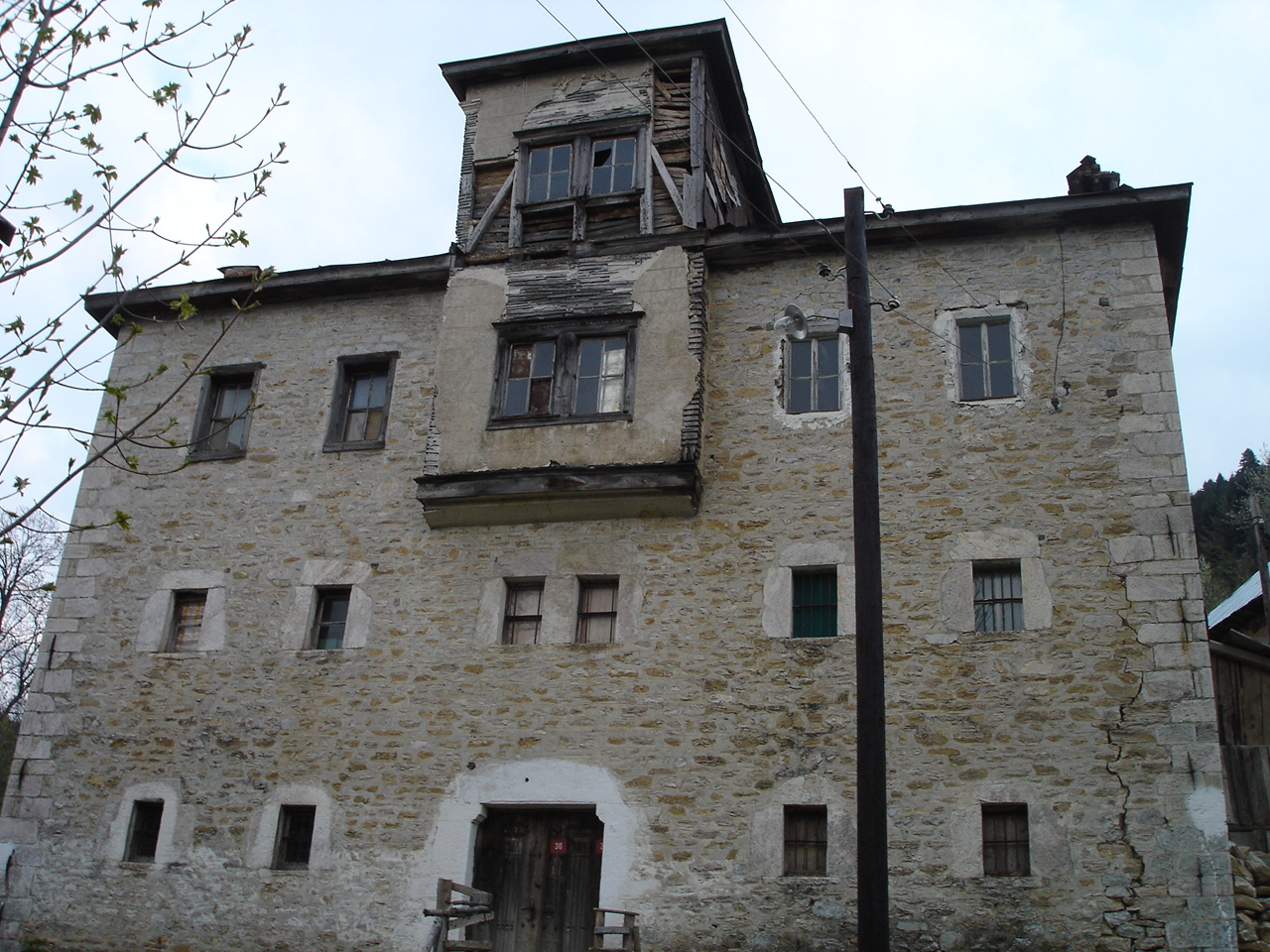
Old house, Krakornica (left) and Kulla architecture: Gligorovci house, Volkovija (right).

Upper Reka is inhabited by Muslim and Christian Albanian speaking people referred through demonyms in Macedonian as Gornorekanec (plural: Gornorekanci) and Rekali (plural: Rekalinj/të) in Albanian. By outsiders they are referred to as Shkreti, from the Albanian word and expression shkretë/i shkret meaning the poor ones, due to their isolated mountainous homeland and difficult living circumstances. The term was used by people from Upper Polog, Mavrovo Pole, and Lower Reka, regardless of ethnicity or religion. In the modern period, the term is used by people from the Mavrovo area and Lower Reka, its use in Macedonian is as a pejorative and in all neighbouring areas the word is used as a way to identify people from Upper Reka. Upper Rekans do not use the word to describe themselves and only say it when describing the hardships of the past.

Of the Albanian speaking populations who remained Christian Orthodox, they assimilated and identify as Macedonians, while those who embraced Islam consider themselves Albanians. Due to the migration of Orthodox Christians to urban centers a few decades ago, today the majority of inhabitants are Muslim Albanians, with a minority of Orthodox Albanian speakers, who self-identify as Macedonians. The 2002 Macedonian census listed Vrbjani as the largest Muslim Albanian settlement in Upper Reka with 625 inhabitants and the main Orthodox settlement was Vrben with 142 inhabitants. In Upper Reka, households are called shpi (Standard Albanian: shtëpi) or literally house and traditionally consisted of patriarchal extended families. These families, some affluent ones, lived in large and at times fortified multi story stone dwellings called kulla or tower house while other families had smaller houses.

=== Economy and Seasonal/Permanent migration ===
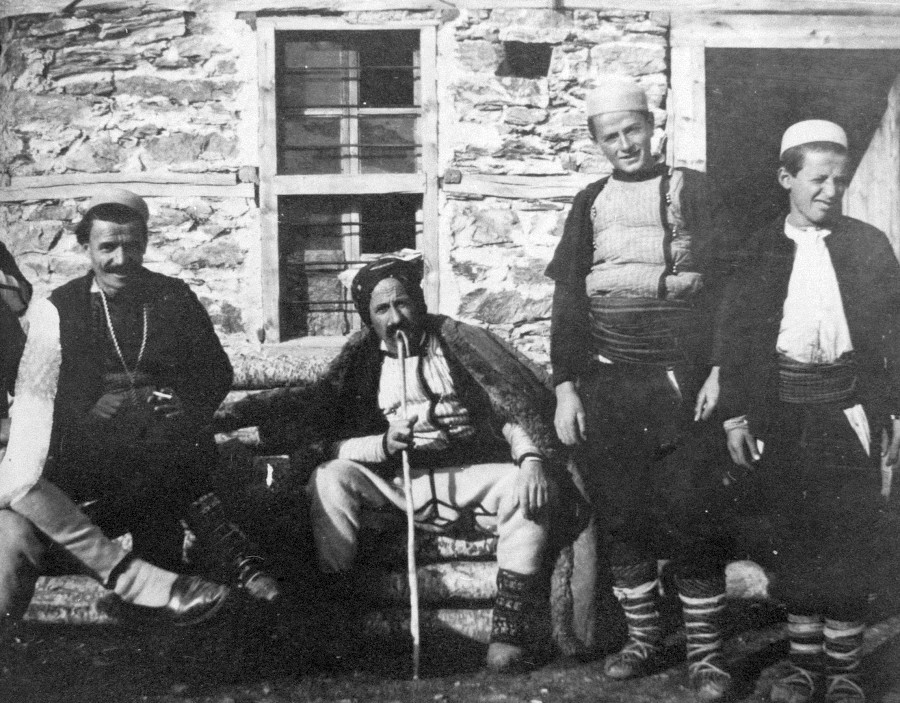
Shepherd in a sheepskin cloak with some men from Štirovica, 1907

Due to difficult living circumstances and at times sociopolitical disturbances, especially in the 19th century, Upper Reka has historically been a region with much outward temporary and permanent migration. Traditionally the population was mainly engaged with animal husbandry and agricultural activities which some of the small remaining population still carry out. As such during the late Ottoman era, Upper Reka males (mainly adults) would seasonally go on kurbet or economic migration. Often they would find employment as pastry makers or as halva, salep and boza merchants and salesmen in the then Ottoman capital Istanbul or regional cities like Skopje and Edirne. In Romania and Bulgaria, some Upper Reka people were also employed in the housing construction industry as stonemasons or builders and likewise when the need arose in cities such as Shkodër or their local area too.

Permanent migratory flows during the late Ottoman era were mainly to neighbouring villages and regions where today these populations often form few households within a settlement amongst their wider Albanian population. In the region of Upper Pollog, Upper Reka people relocated to the following villages: Čegrane, Forino, Korito, Balin Dol, Malo Turčane, Dolna Banjica, Sretkovo, Novo Selo, Rečane, Vrutok, Pečkovo, Zdunje, Vrapčište, Kalište and Gradec. In Lower Polog: Gorno Sedlarce, Rakovec, Žerovjane, Radiovce, Tenovo, Lukovica, Sedlarevo and Gurgurnica. In villages within the vicinity of Skopje city: Crn Vrv, Krušopek, Sveta Petka and Patiška Reka, while near Veles at: Gorno Jabolčište, Sogle, Klukovec and Buzalkovo. In some villages, the Upper Reka population migrated there as Christians like in Lukovica and only converted thereafter to Islam. While in Patiška Reka, they remained Orthodox and Albanian speaking until World War Two, before relocating to Skopje thereafter. The population in these new villages outside Upper Reka still identifies as Albanian, the Orthodox part of the settlers from Reka after their relocation to nearby villages and towns where Slavic was the language of the majority gradually were assimilated ("Macedonicized") after the Second World War. The villages were inhabited by large populations of people whom in recent decades, have migrated to Skopje, Veles, Tetovo and Gostivar or the majority to Italy and Germany.

Some Upper Reka residents from Vrbjani have in recent decades migrated to the neighbouring Muslim Macedonian village of Žirovnica with municipal services in Lower Reka and number some 258 people. While Orthodox Christians migrated from the 1950s onwards to the then Yugoslav capital Belgrade, other cities like Skopje and to nearby Gostivar town where they form the main population of Durtlok neighbourhood. Due to the 2001 insurgency in northern Macedonia, the village of Tanuše was affected by the conflict which made some residents migrate thereafter to other places. Young Upper Reka people in recent times have also emigrated to Western countries, while some older inhabitants return to their homes in Upper Reka during the summer period.

== Language and Culture ==
=== Upper Reka Albanian dialect ===
The Albanian Upper Reka sub-dialect belongs to the larger Gheg dialect spoken by Northern Albanians. In the 2000s, among the Orthodox population residing in Upper Reka, in terms of daily speech were mainly fluent in Albanian between themselves and even the young, while having knowledge of Macedonian. In the modern period (2010s), Muslim Albanians residing in Upper Reka are to varying degrees bilingual in Macedonian.

=== Observances, Customs and other folk culture ===
In Upper Reka, a number of secular and religious holidays are celebrated. Secular celebrations are Diten e Vers (first Day of Spring) celebrated March 1. The main Orthodox Christian celebrations are Shnkrysh (Feast of the Cross) and Blagavesht (the Annunciation). Other important celebrations are the feast days of saints such as Shingjergj (St. George), Shumtanas (St. Athanasius), Shmitr (St. Demetrius), Shën Eremia (St. Jeremiah), Shën Mëria (St.Mary) and St. Barbara. Muslim celebrations are Sultan Nevrus (Nowruz), Ramadan and the two Bajrams (Eid al-Fitr, and Eid al-Adha). The traditional clothing of Upper Reka, though sharing similarities with clothing of surrounding areas, is known for its distinctive regional style and use of multiple colours, as well as complex floral and other patterns.

== History ==
=== Origins ===
Various positions exist about the origins of the Upper Reka population within Balkan related scholarship. Some of those by historians and ethnographers were based on ideological or nationalist perspectives, referring either to an Albanisation or Slavisation of the population.

One of the earliest authors to write about the matter was Serbian journalist Spiridon Gopčević. In his now discredited work regarding the Balkans, Gopčević claimed that Upper Reka inhabitants were “Albanianized Slavs”. In the late 1890s Štilijan Čaparoski and folklorist Panajot Ginoski, both from Galičnik, Dolna Reka, maintained that Upper Reka inhabitants spoke a corrupted form of Albanian that was understood only by the locals, and contained a mixture of Slavic and Albanians words.

Due to some patronymic names of families, Serbian philologist Dušan Nedeljković contended a Vlach origin for some Upper Reka families in the villages Brodec and Reč, alongside Slavic origins that were Albanianized. Historian Nick Atanasovski, who did fieldwork in Lower Reka contends that the sub-regions of Small, Lower and Upper Reka were subjected to Islamisation, though not colonisation. While anthropologist Mirjana Mirčevska who did field work in Upper Reka during the 2000s, stated that both the Muslim and Orthodox population was mainly of Macedonian Slavic origin, with possible Albanian elements in their ethnogenesis. Mirčevska recorded local Upper Reka traditions in Bogdevo, Krakornica and Ničpur that attribute the founding of those villages to three brothers: Boge, Krako and Niko who originated from the Kolašin region located in contemporary Montenegro.

Galaba Palikruševa, examining medieval Ottoman tax registers or defters of the region in the 1970s regarding personal names, stated that there was a prominent non-Slavic element in Upper Reka of Albanian and/or Vlach origin. As such, Palikruševa contended that certain scholarship which stated that the contemporary Upper Reka population was Slavs who adopted the Albanian language to preserve their Christian faith is an untenable position. Historian Dimitar Bechev regards the Christian populace of Upper Reka as Orthodox Albanian speakers, whereas historian Noel Malcolm considers them to be Orthodox Albanians. Albanian philologist Edibe Selimi-Osmani who did fieldwork in Upper Reka during the 1990s and 2000s regarded the population as being of Albanian origin.

Linguist Qemal Murati, referring to both the Muslim and Orthodox population as Albanians argued that scholars who suggested the Upper Reka population are Albanianized Slavs have done so due to nationalist reasons so as to deny the historical Albanian element in the region. Murati also states that certain Upper Reka Albanian vocabulary regarding kinship attributed to a Vlach origin does not suffice. This is due to those Albanian words being direct borrowings from Latin that had not undergone an intermediate stage in Aromanian before entering the Albanian language. In the early 2010s, scholar Andrea Pieroni and a team of researchers from various national backgrounds did fieldwork and a comparative study of past and present Upper Reka botanical terminology. In their findings they concluded that the Upper Reka population was one that “had been heavily influenced by the Slavic culture - and not vice versa, as Spiridon Gopčević stated.” The research team attributed that acculturation process to the imposition of the border in 1912 limiting contact with Albania and extensive interactions with surrounding multiethnic regions where trade was undertaken. In addition Slavic languages and culture played a role in that process due to they being the national and dominating ones of the state. The team also identified that there was some Aromanian botanical terminology present in the Upper Reka dialect.

Andrea Pieroni and a multinational research team in the early 2020s found Slavic terminology was present in botanical terminology among neighbouring Albanian villages outside Upper Reka whose ancestral origins were from the region. The team's conclusion was certain Slavic botanical terminology associated with women entered the community through historic intermarriage with neighbouring Orthodox Slavic women of Gora and the Macedonian Mijaks. Slavic botanical terminology used by men, and not the household, came from trade and pastoral interactions with neighbouring Slavic areas.

=== Medieval Ottoman period ===
During the 14th century Upper Reka was part of the Lordship of Prilep, of the Mrnjavčević family, until 1395, when its territory was subjugated to Bayezid I of the Ottoman Empire. In 1467 Ottoman defters list the region of Reka as a vilayet and in Upper Reka there were 15 inhabited villages and 3 uninhabited ones. The following villages recorded for the first time were: Štirovica, Ribnica, Vrben, Ničpur, Nistrovo, Volkovija, Žužnje, Brodec, Krakornica, Strezimir, and Ribničica (a former village), with Vrbjani being the largest settlement. Beličica, Kičinica and Leskovo (a former village) were listed as uninhabited. The villages of Nivišta, Bibaj, Grekaj, Reč and Tanuše where not registered as existing at that time. In light of the anthroponymic evidence provided by the archival material, Palikruševa comments that the attested non-Slavic personal names are generally ambiguous and do not necessarily indicate either an Albanian or Vlach origin of the bearer, although undoubtedly attest to an Albanian-speaking element in the region. On the other hand, Murati notes that the vast majority of the recorded non-Slavic anthroponyms (e.g., Gjin, Gjergj, Gjon, Tanush, Progon, Meksha, Bardh, Kola) were Albanian in character. In 1519, a few Muslim households are counted within Ottoman defters in villages like Vrbjani, Sence, Ribničica and Kučuk or Small Ribnica. A few Muslim households began to appear in the villages of: Krakornica, Strezimir, Štirovica and Žužnje.

=== Middle to Late Ottoman period ===
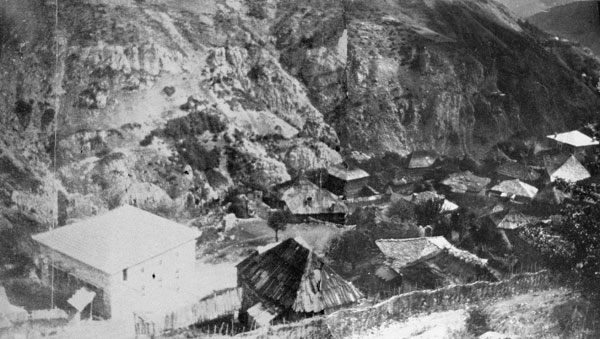
Štirovica village, 1907

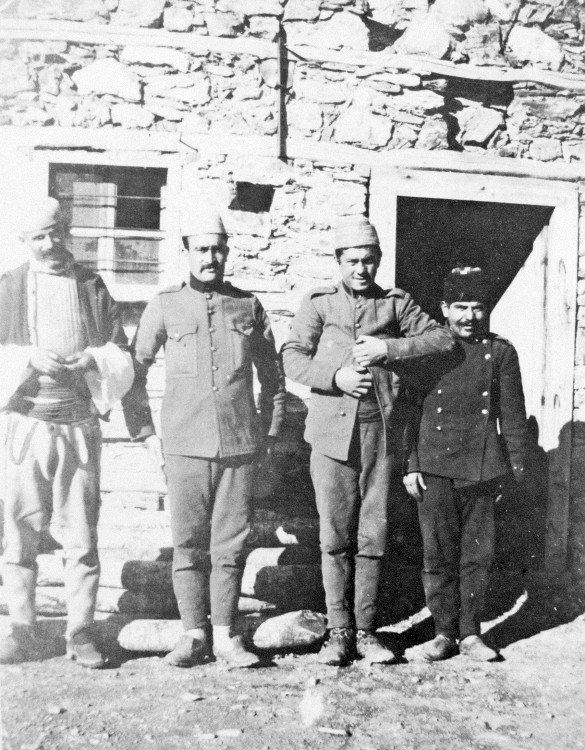
Ottoman gendarmerie in Upper Reka, 1907

Intensive conversion to Islam occurred in Upper Reka from the late 18th to early 19th centuries, stemming in part from the closure of the Peć Patriarchate and demise of its parishes. The village of Štirovica was the last settlement where its 30 remaining Christian households converted to Islam in 1855. Various Muslim and Orthodox Upper Reka inhabitants still retain memories of family ties and distant common ancestors. A small Catholic population was also present that stemmed from some Catholic Albanians who migrated to Upper Reka from nearby areas located in contemporary Albania and later became assimilated.

Due to Upper Reka's isolation and difficult living conditions, some inhabitants turned to banditry during the 18th and 19th century while others migrated to cities and regions for work. In the late Ottoman period the wider Reka area formed a nahiye or district with its centre in Žirovnica village that had administrative officials and a small army garrison. Orthodox Christian villages of Upper Reka in the late Ottoman period either had a Bulgarian or Serbian village priest. Due to the Macedonian struggle, these priests were sometimes replaced with one or the other depending on the fluid church allegiances of a settlement's Orthodox inhabitants. Certain Orthodox individuals from Upper Reka during this time like Josif Bageri made significant contributions to the Albanian national awakening.

In the 19th century, due to the lack of Albanian language schools and books, but also as a result of foreign propaganda, the Albanians of Upper Reka were to prone to being assimilated.

Serbian researcher M.V. Veselinović wrote in 1890 there were fifteen Upper Reka villages that spoke Arbanaški, were of Serbian Orthodox faith, had Serbian liturgy and "celebrated the same religious holidays as the Slavs". Veselinović stated Upper Rekans and Serbs shared a religious affiliation, while "their language brought them closer to the Albanians". In the late 1890s Štilijan Čaparoski and folklorist Panajot Ginoski, both from Galičnik, Dolna Reka, maintained that Upper Reka inhabitants spoke a corrupted form of Albanian that was understood only by the locals, and contained a mixture of Slavic and Albanians words. Ethnographer Vasil Kanchov in his demographic study of Ottoman Macedonia (1900) wrote the Kaza of Reka had a total of 23 Albanian villages with a majority Orthodox population in the region. At that time, the Albanians of Reka accepted the authority of the Bulgarian church and attended Bulgarian schools. According to the newspaper Shkupi (1911), Orthodox Albanians of Reka informed the Constantinople Patriarchate they were against foreign languages being taught in their villages, or accepting priests without knowledge of Albanian. The inhabitants demanded Albanian be taught in the school and church, otherwise they would seek to become Catholic.

=== Yugoslav period ===
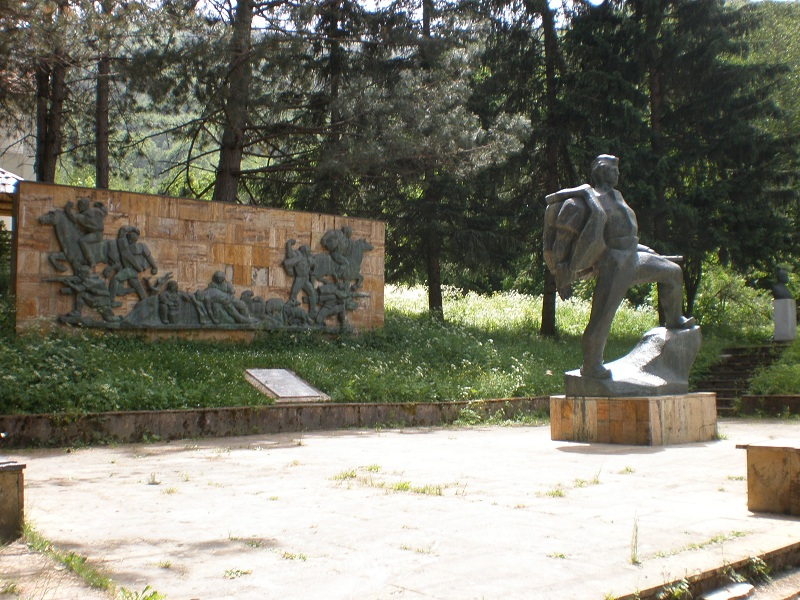
Monument in Trnica area dedicated to fallen civilians and partisans of the Beličica massacre in 1944

Ottoman rule lasted until the First Balkan War (1912–13) with the arrival of the Serbian army that annexed the region into Serbia. In 1913, Muslim Albanians of the region, led by imam Malik Mema, rose up against Serbian forces and managed to free the region and also some villages of the Gostivar area. During World War I, local resistance continued as the region passed to Bulgaria. As such Serbian and Bulgarian forces during 1912-1916 burned down the villages of Trnica, Reč, Dubovo, Štirovica and Strezimir. A number of Serbian authors of this period denied there was an Albanian ethnic identity for the Orthodox populations of Upper Reka. Serbian historian Rista Nikolić described the Albanians of Reka as Serbs, due to the fact they were of the Orthodox faith.

Bulgarian authors have also written about the Orthodox Albanians of Upper Reka. In 1915, historian Yordan Ivanov wrote Orthodox Albanians of Gostivar were undergoing Bulgarisation due to them being near the Bulgarian population. Linguist Stefan Mladenov stated in the Galičnik area counting Albanians accurately was difficult, especially in Upper Reka, because there were Christian villages such as Beličica, Duf, Kičinica and Sence who spoke Albanian and Bulgarian. He described the Muslim Albanians of Upper Reka keeping Christian traditions and living fraternally with its Christian Albanian population.

A Serb journalist visited the region and wrote a report (1927) for the newspaper Vreme about the "Serbs who only speak Albanian". He described the villages of Beličica, Brodec, Duf, Gorno Jelovce, Kičinica and Vrben, as "pure Serbian", continuing Serb naming practises and Orthodoxy dating back to the Ottoman period. Villagers had no knowledge of Serbian and spoke only Albanian, but identified as Serbs and wore similar clothing to the neighbouring Mavrovo region. The report described the opening of Serb schools and the hope children would learn Serbian "for the first time" and teach the "forgotten" language to their parents.

The region later became part of Kingdom of Yugoslavia. In 1941 after Yugoslavia's occupation by Axis powers, Upper Reka was attached to Albania by Fascist Italy. Communist partisan resistance emerged from villages like Beličica that fought against Albanian fascist Balli Kombëtar forces which supported Upper Reka's inclusion into Albania. On 19 September 1944, after 19 Partisans were captured, they along with 17 Beličica villagers were massacred by Ballist forces headed by Aqif Reçani near the area of the former village of Trnica. After World War II, Upper Reka became part of Communist Yugoslavia. The region remained isolated and undeveloped which resulted in migrations to distant urban centres like Belgrade, Skopje and Gostivar, and to Western countries.

=== Modern North Macedonia ===
Upper Reka became part of the Republic of Macedonia (now North Macedonia), when the Socialist Republic of Macedonia, a republic within Yugoslavia, gained independence following a referendum in 1991. During the 2001 Albanian insurgency some Macedonian military police, stationed in the village of Tanuše, damaged the village mosque to prevent its possible use by NLA guerrillas. In the 2000s, among the wider Macedonian population, there was little awareness of the existence of an Orthodox Christian population which used Albanian as a language of everyday communication. In the 2010s, Upper Reka came to national attention when a few prominent Upper Reka Orthodox Christian individuals like Branko Manoilovski declared an Albanian identity or Branislav Sinadinovski who called for an Albanian Orthodox Church to be present within the region. These moves have been overwhelmingly opposed and denounced by most Orthodox Upper Reka people who see them as the outcome of politics and propaganda. Orthodox Upper Rekans view their identity as Macedonian, consider Macedonian their mother tongue and religious tradition as historically Slavonic. Orthodox Upper Rekans acknowledge Albanian was a spoken language, but according to them they did so in past times as a way to protect their community from the actions of armed bands in the region.

In the mid 2010s, there was some cultural revival within Upper Reka such as the festival Takimet e Rekës së Epërme (Upper Reka gathering), first held during August 2014 in Ribnica and the creation of a cultural association named Josif Bageri by some prominent Muslim and Christian Upper Reka individuals aiming at socio-cultural, historical and linguistic preservation of Upper Reka heritage. Historical village relations and bonds between Muslim and Orthodox Upper Rekans had lapsed and become nonexistent by the 2010s.

== Gallery ==
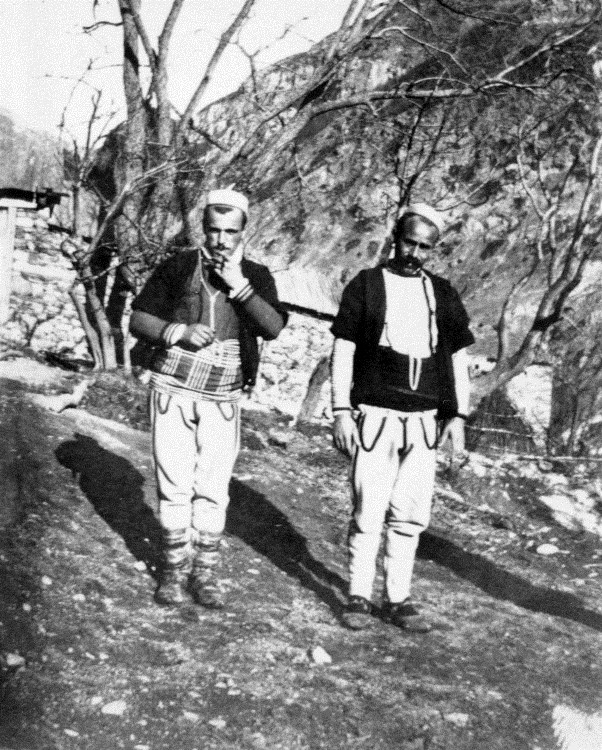
Two Upper Reka men: A man from Reč on the left and a man from Strezmir on the right.

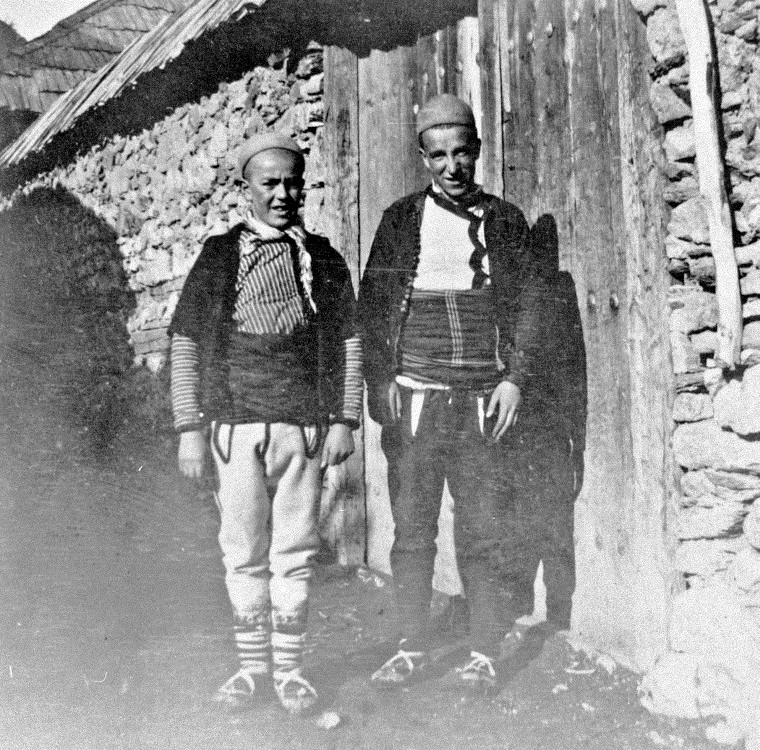
Two young men of Štirovica showing off opingas (shoes).

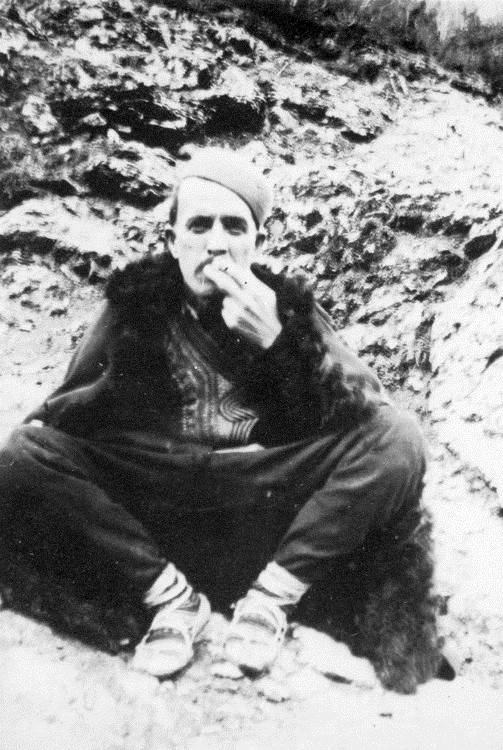
Man smoking, in the upper Reka valley near Debar.

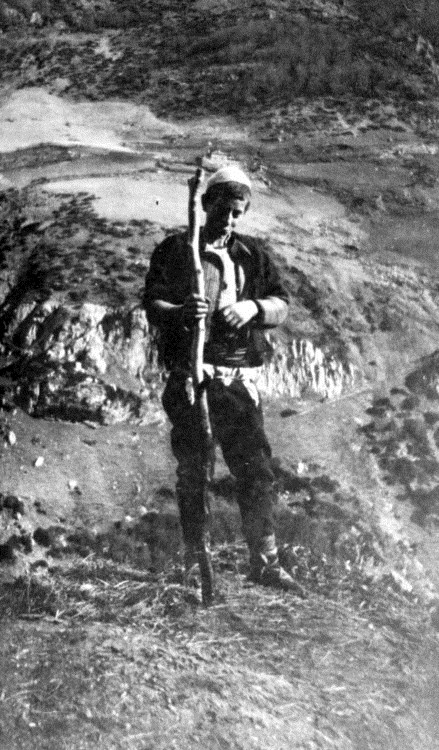
Young Albanian in the upper Reka valley near Debar.

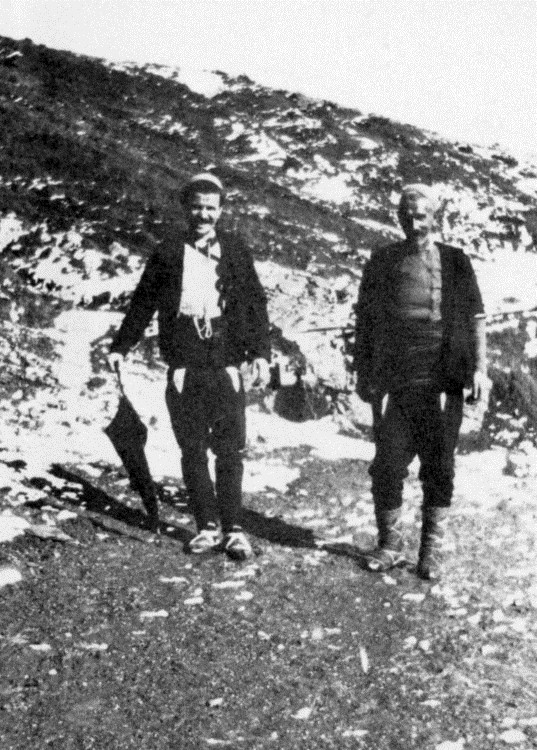
Albanians in the Upper Reka valley near Debar.

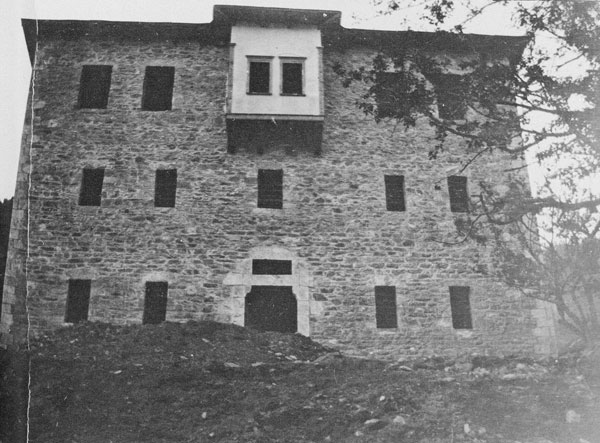
New kulla (tower house) in Brodec, 1907

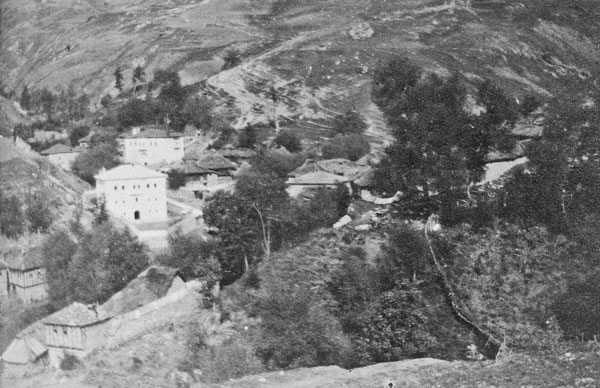
Brodec village, 1907

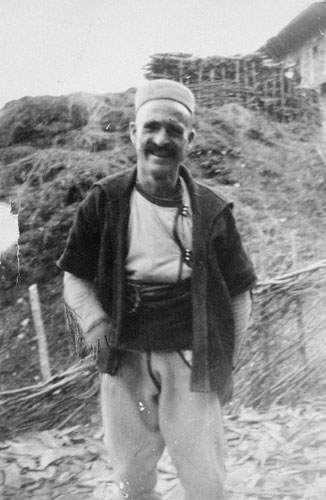
Albanian from Upper Reka valley near Debar, 1907

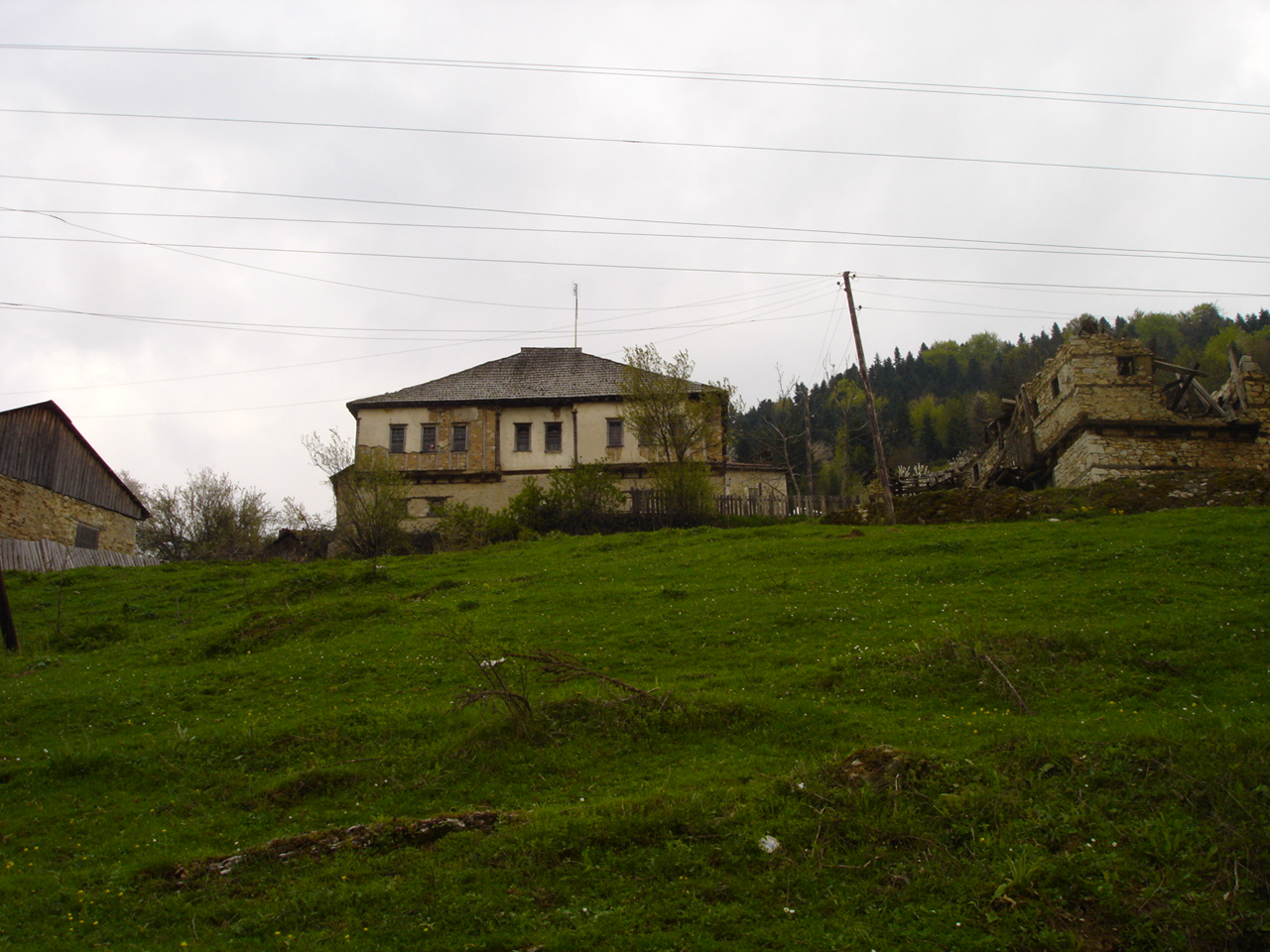
View from the lower neighborhood of upland houses, Volkovija

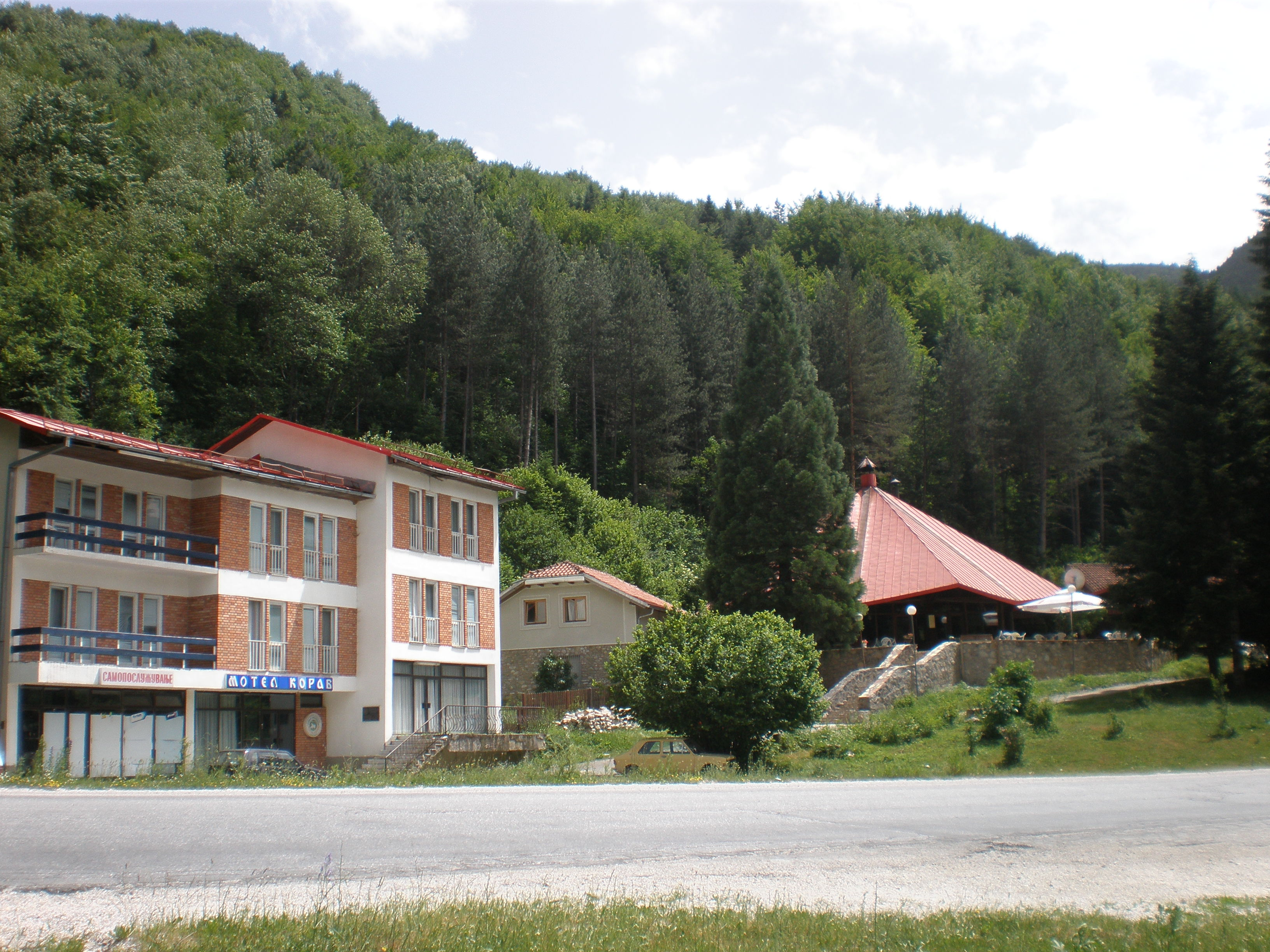
Korab motel located in area of former Trnica village

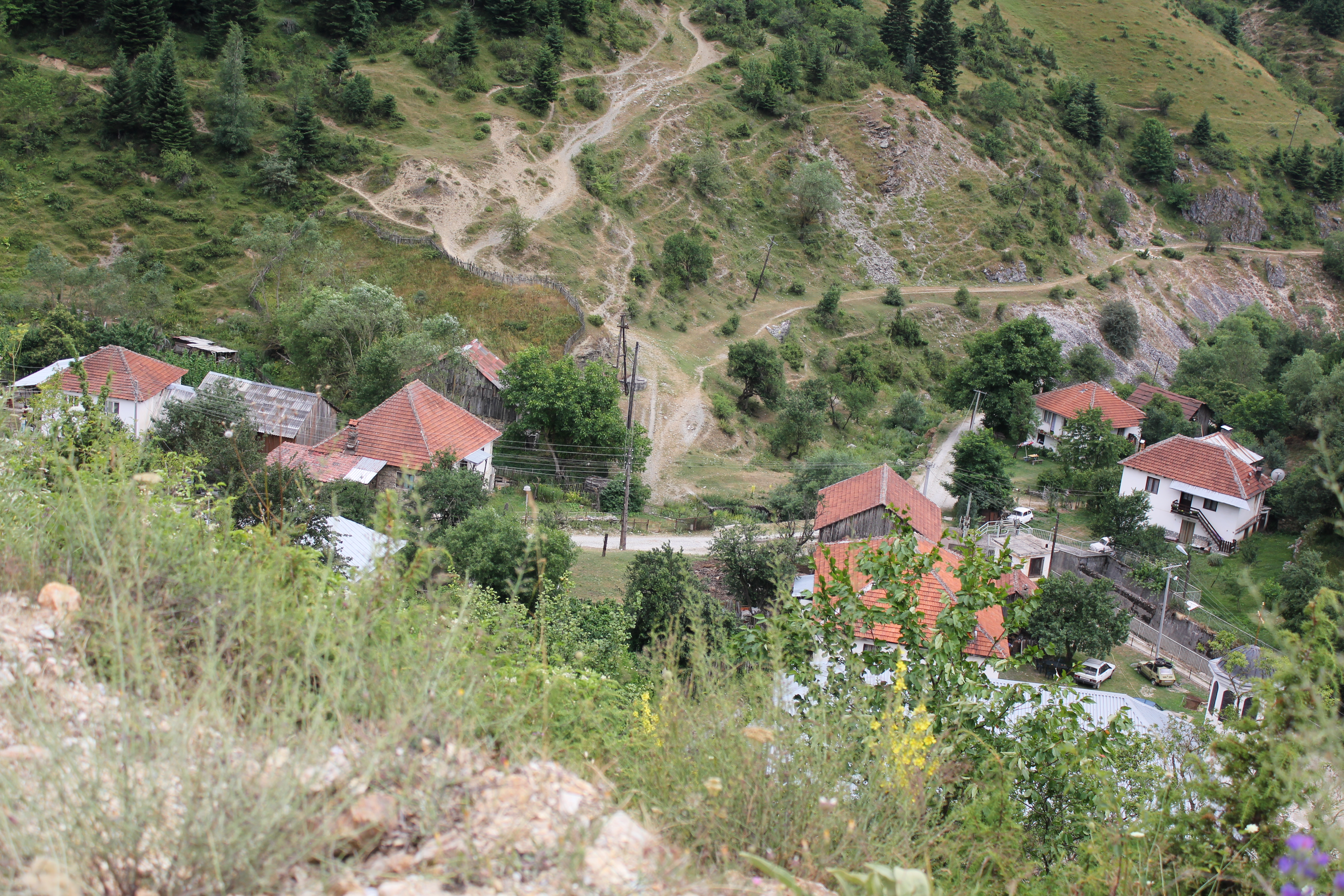
Vrben village

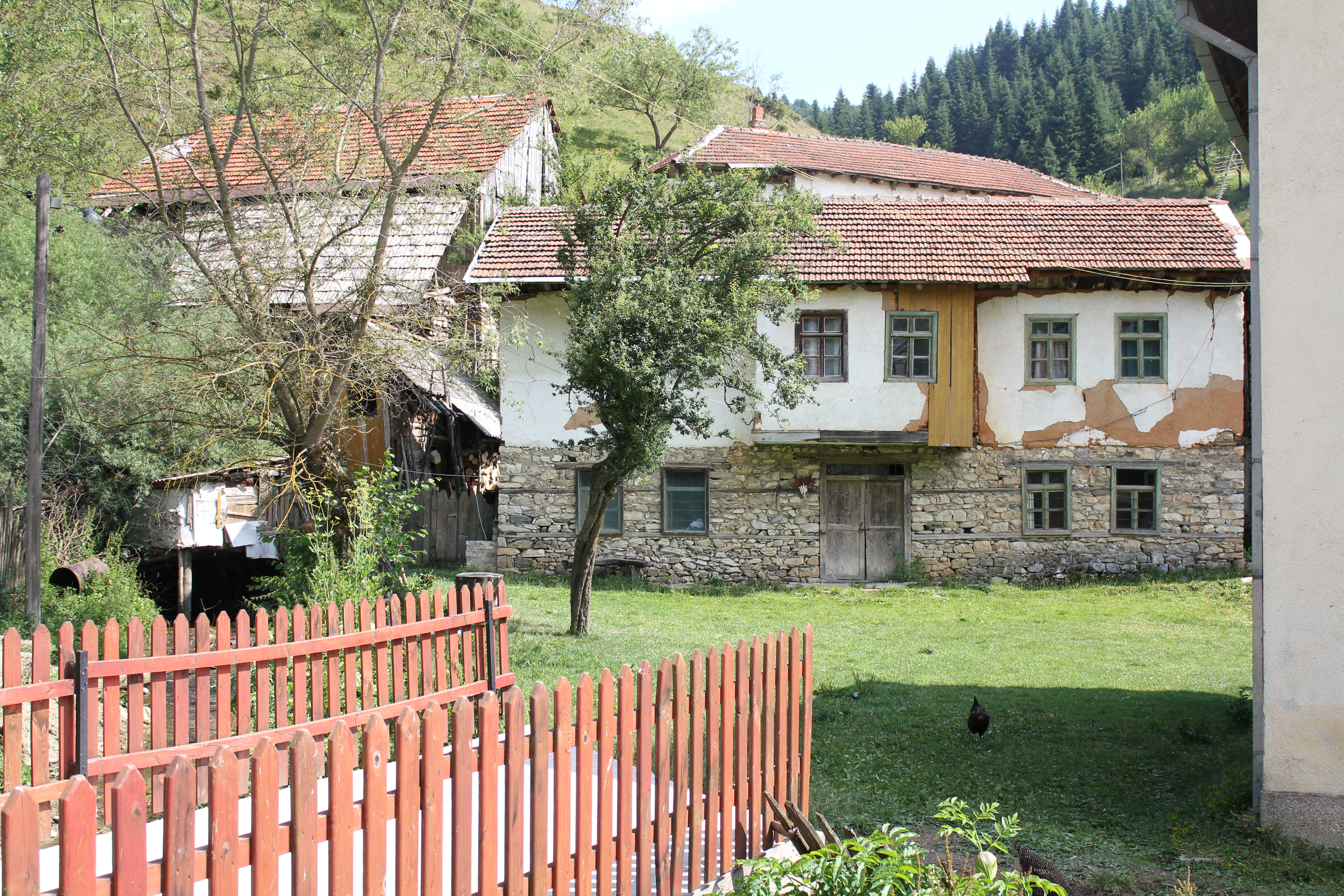
Upper neighbourhood, Vrben

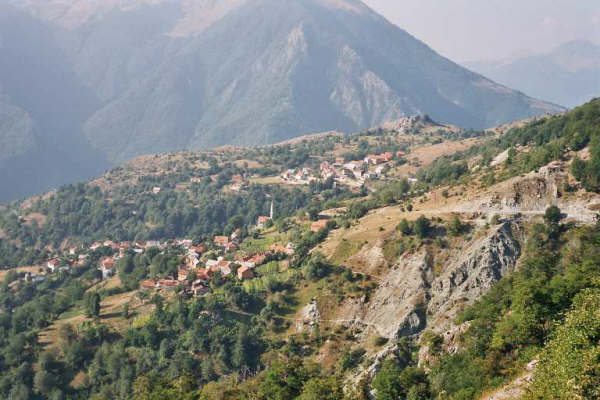
Vrbjani village

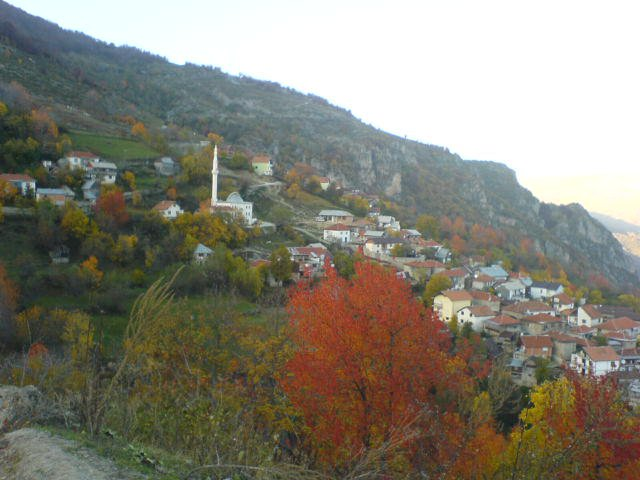
Autumn in Vrbjani

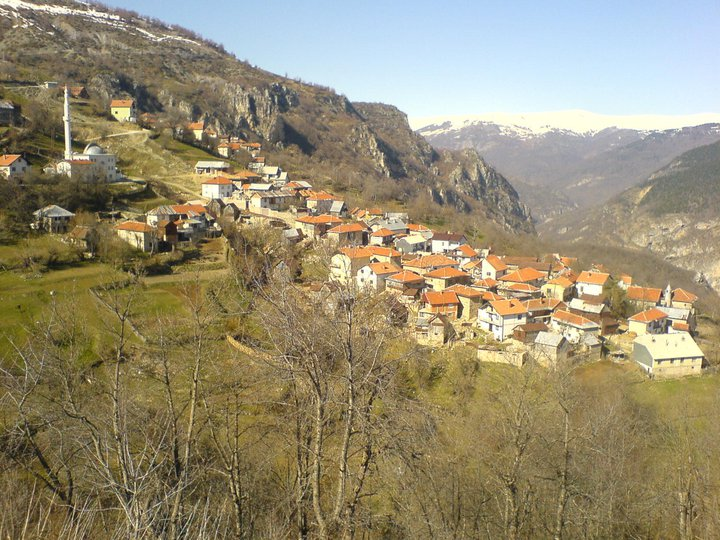
Autumn season just prior to coming of Winter, Vrbjani

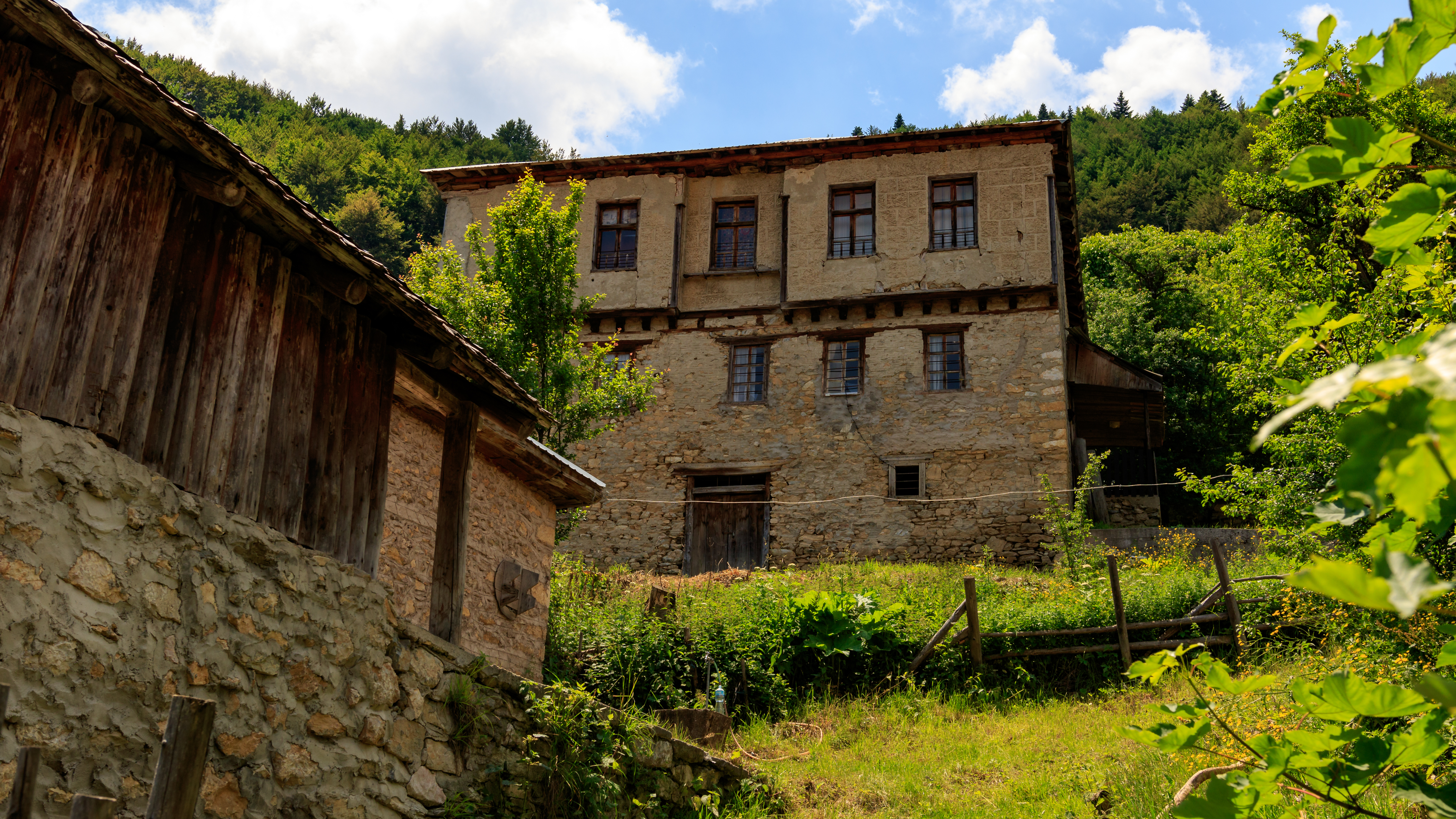
Old houses, Beličica

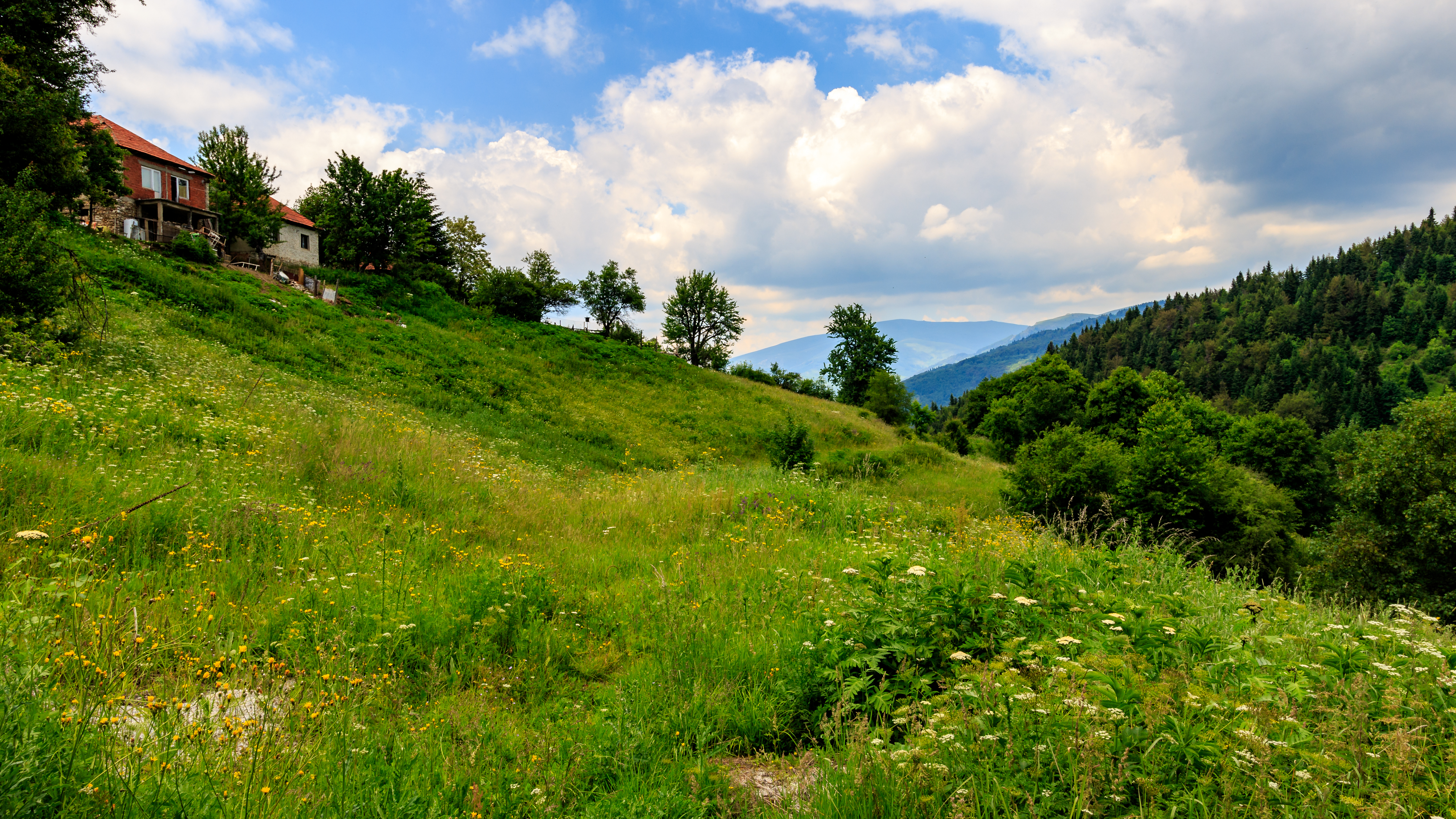
View of Beličica village from nearby church

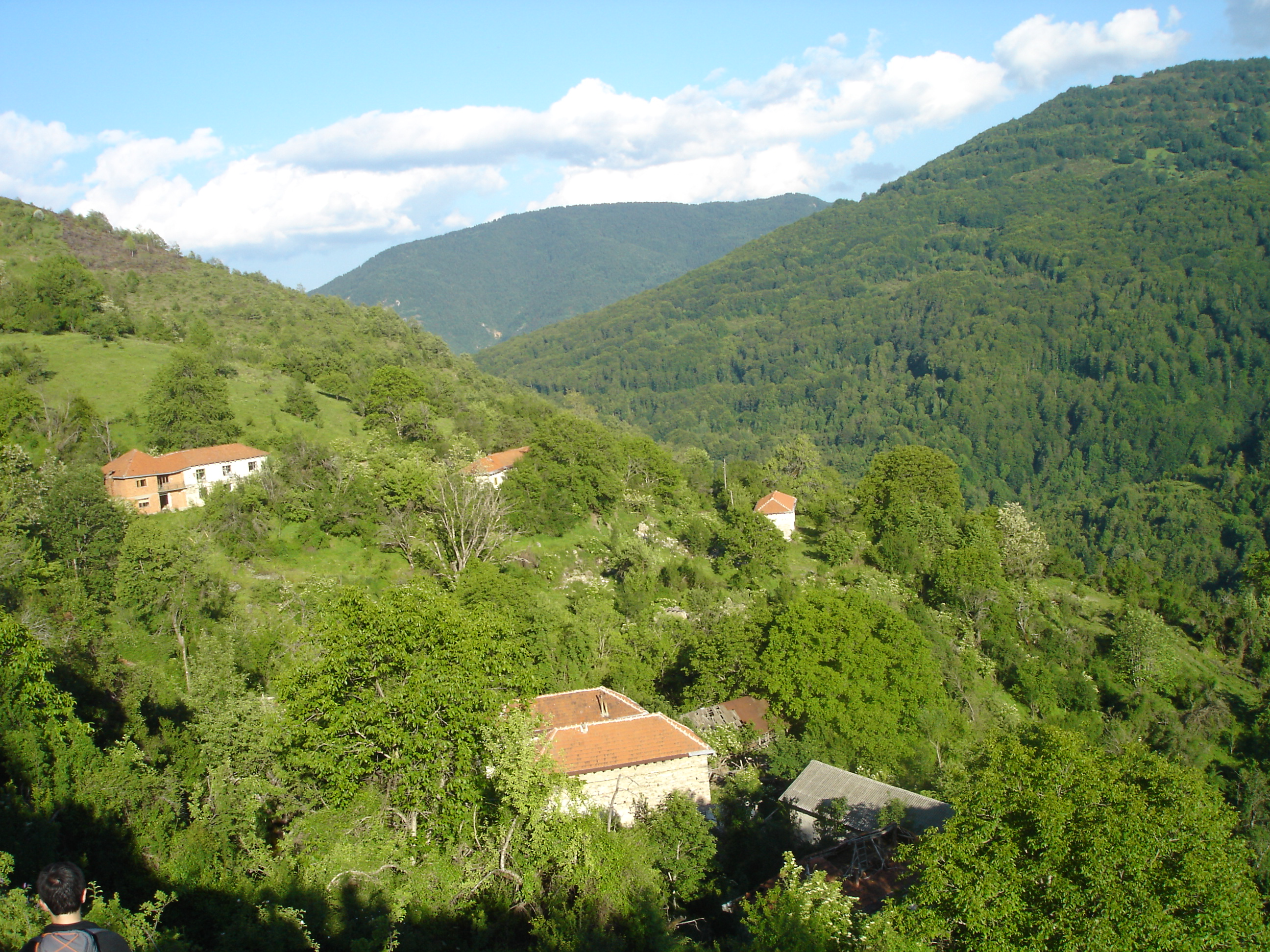
View of Ribnica village

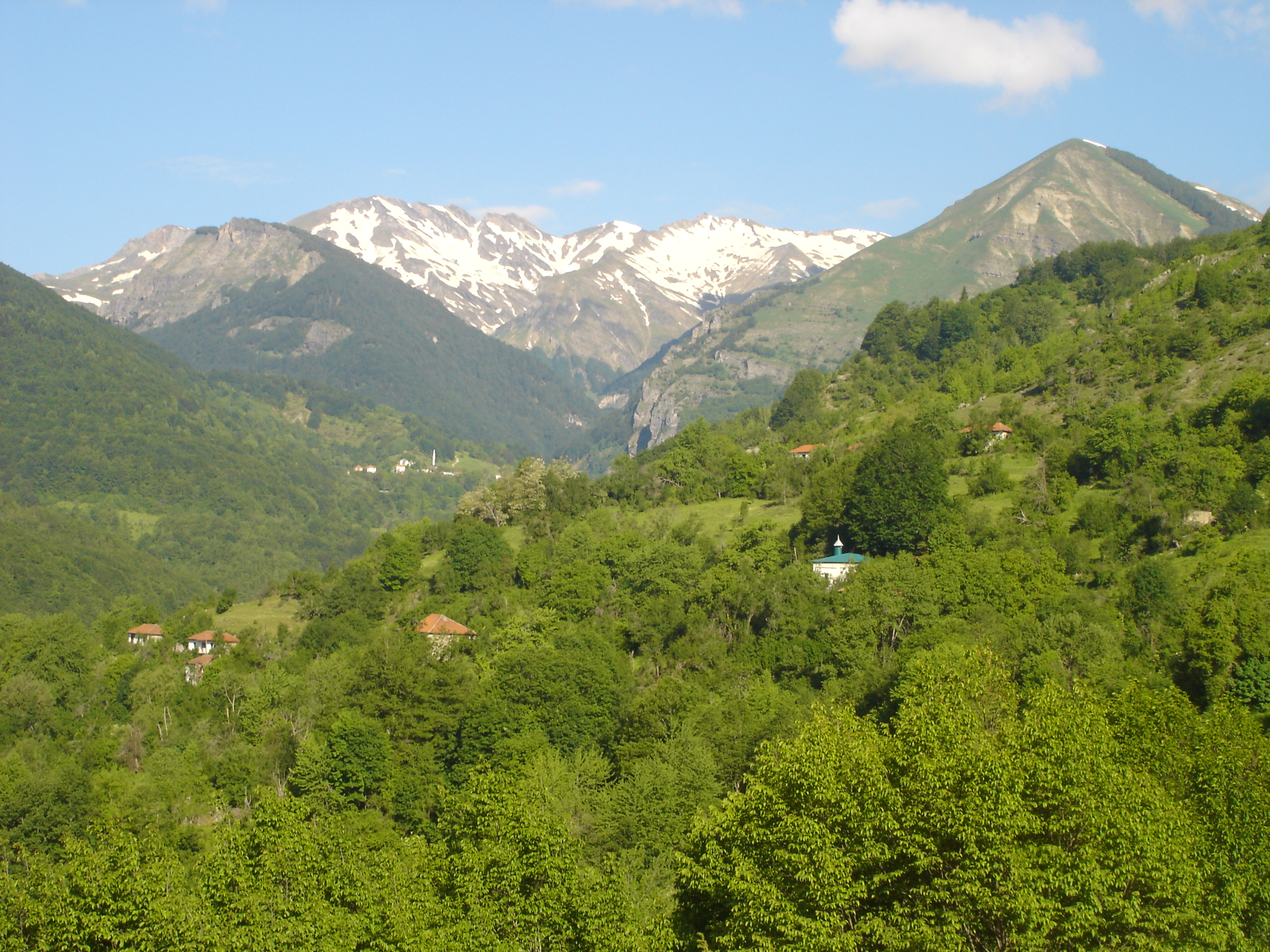
View of Ribnica and Tanuše villages with peaks and mountain pass of Korabska Vrata in background

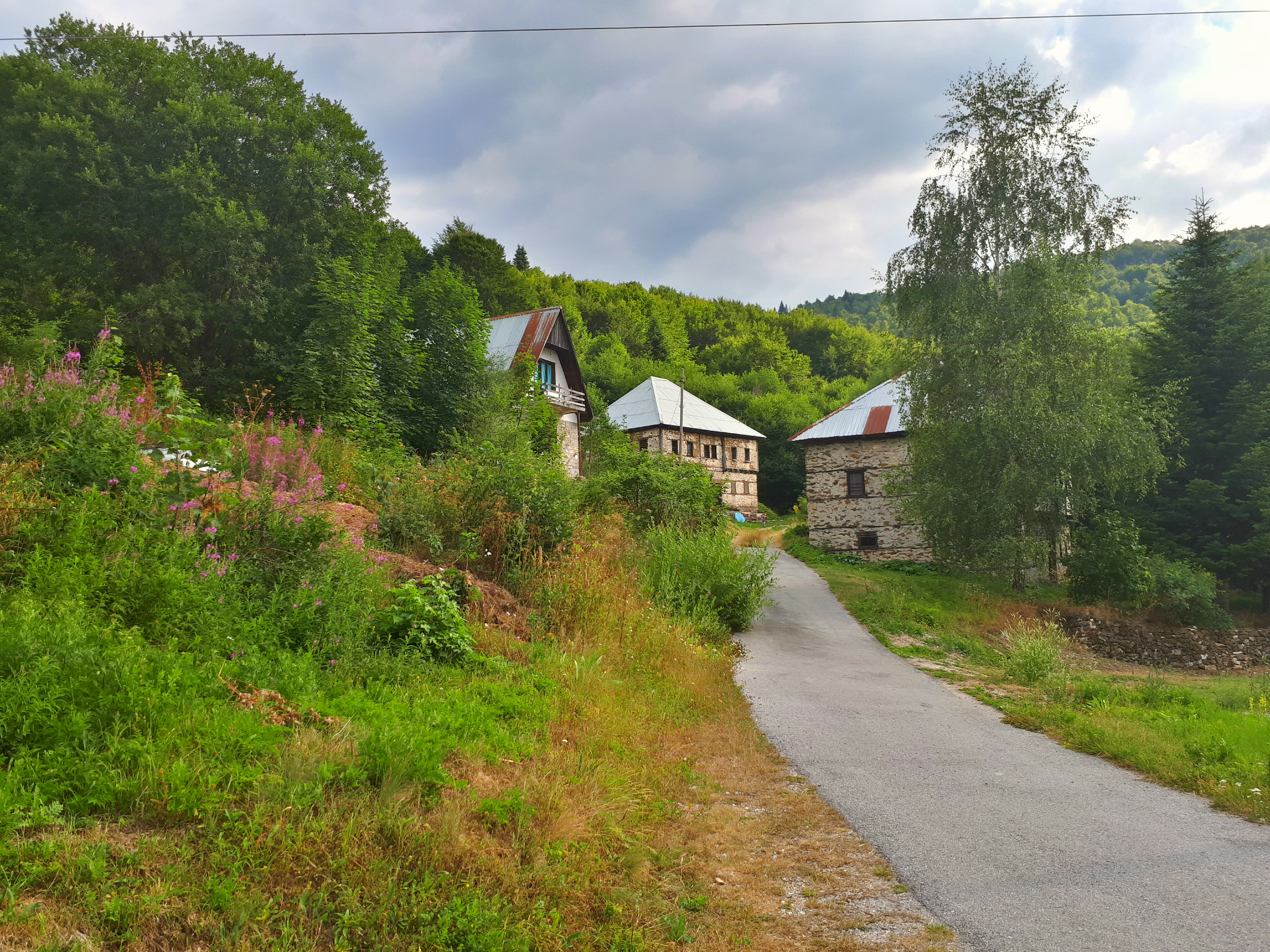
Entrance of the Kicinica village

== Notable people ==
- Bajazid Doda - author and photographer
- Paskal Sotirovski - astrophysicist, specialist in Solar Physics
- Branko Manoilovski - politician in North Macedonia
- Ismail Strazimiri - revolutionary, military and educational activist.
- Josif Bageri - Albanian rilindas and poet
- Llazar Siljani (sq) - Albanian writer
- Maliq Tanusha (sq) - Albanian rilindas
