= Žirovnica, Mavrovo i Rostuše =

Žirovnica Жировница Zheranicë
- Village
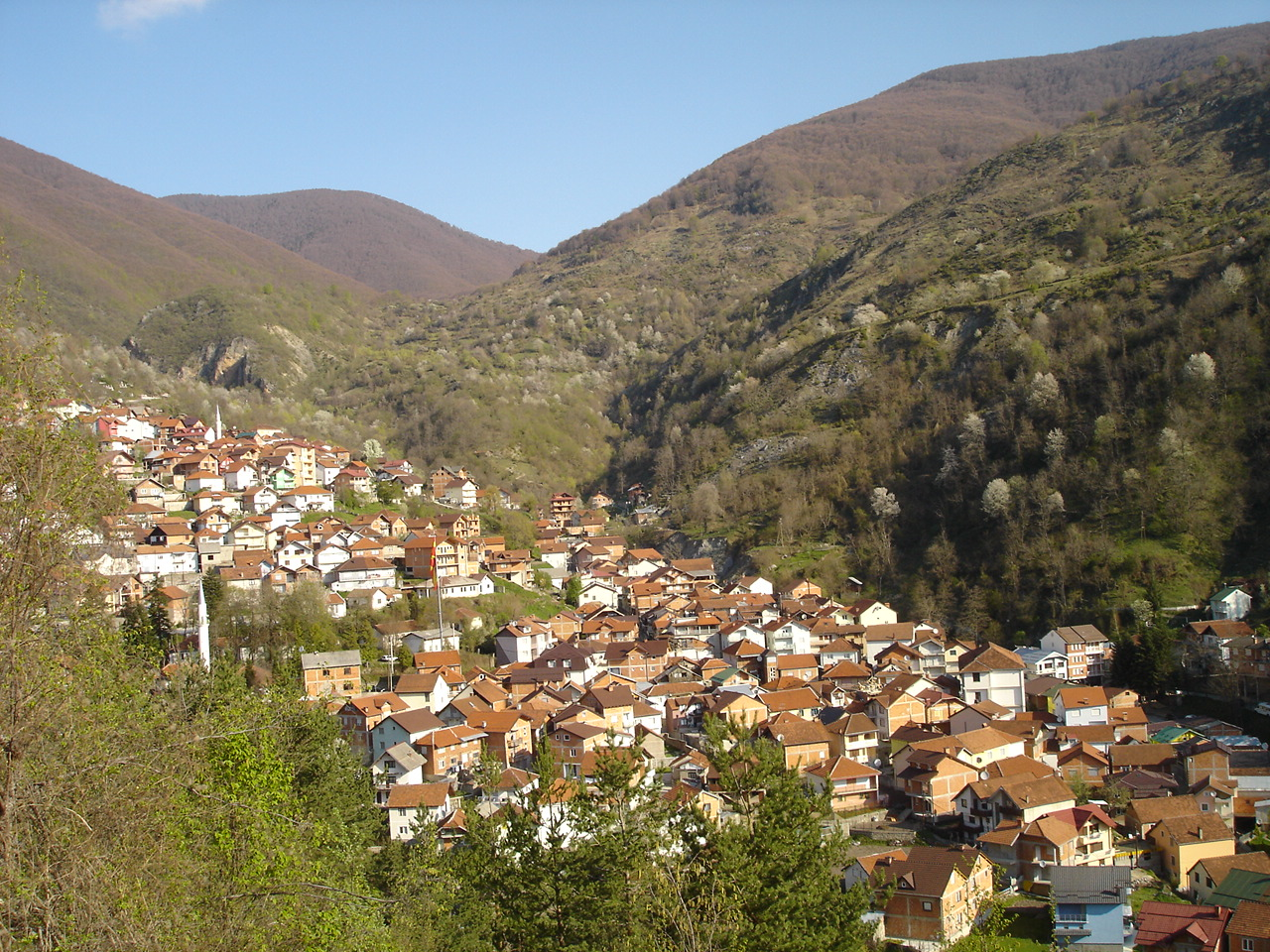
- View of the village

- Location within North Macedonia
- Coordinates: 41°40′N 20°35′E
- Country: North Macedonia
- Region: Polog
- Municipality: Mavrovo and Rostuša

Population (2002)
  - Total: 1,608
- Time zone: UTC+1 (CET)
  - Summer (DST): UTC+2 (CEST)
- Car plates: GV
- Website: .

Žirovnica (Macedonian: Жировница, Albanian: Zheranicë) is a village in the municipality of Mavrovo and Rostuša, North Macedonia.

== Demographics ==
Žirnovnica (Zhirnovinec) is recorded in the Ottoman defter of 1467 as a village in the ziamet of Reka which was under the authority of Karagöz Bey. The village had a total of 22 households and the anthroponymy attested depicts a mixed Albanian-Slavic character (e.g., Petko Palgushi).

Žirovnica has also traditionally been inhabited by a Torbeš population. The village contains municipal services and civic buildings. As such in recent decades, some Upper Reka Albanian residents from neighbouring Vrbjani have migrated to Žirovnica and number 258 people.

According to the 2002 census, the village had a total of 1,608 inhabitants. Ethnic groups in the village include:

- Macedonians 1,314
- Albanians 258
- Turks 20
- Bosniaks 4
- Others 12
