= Vrben =

Vrben Врбен Vërben
- Village
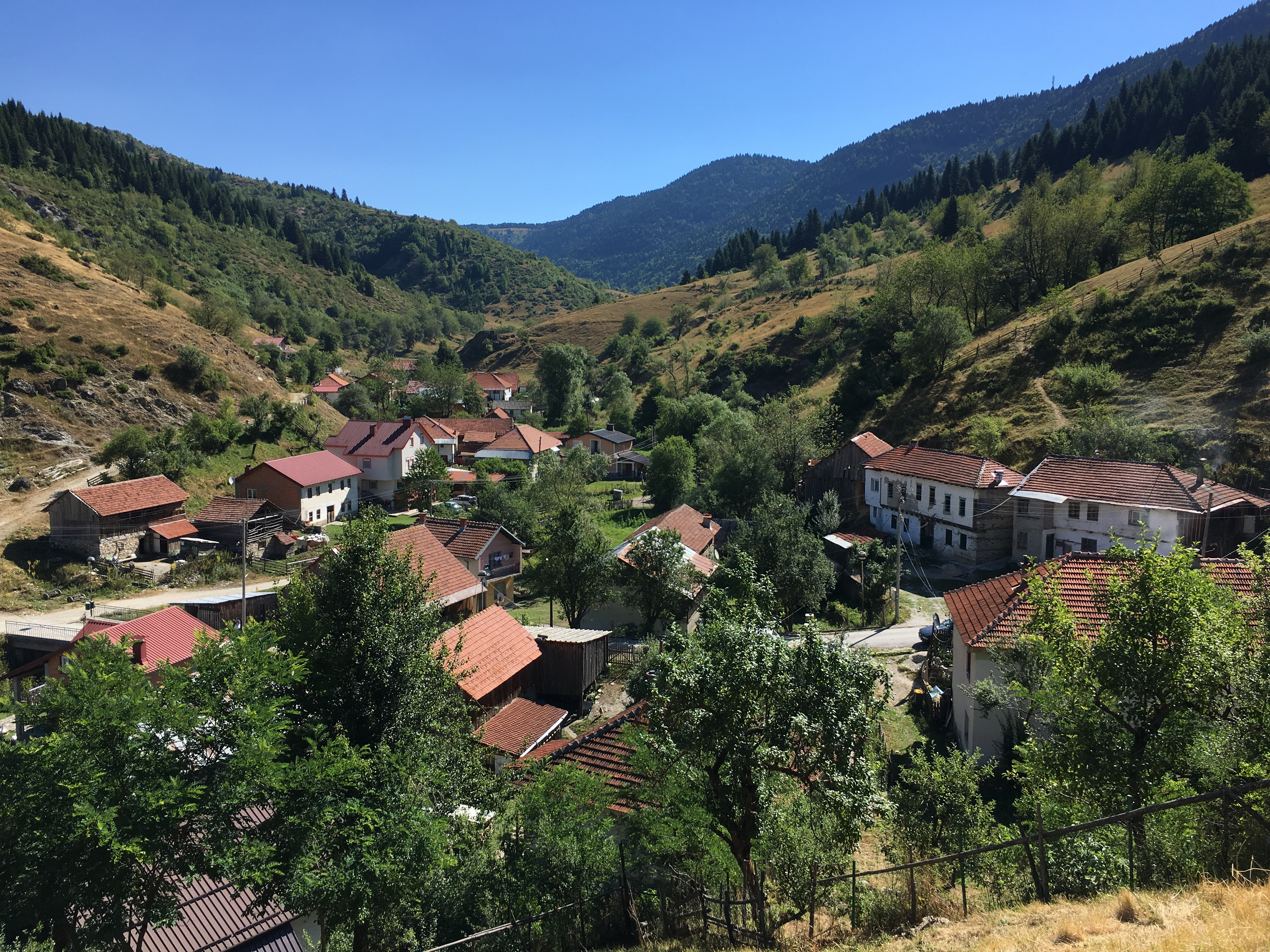
- Panoramic view of the village Vrben

- Location within North Macedonia
- Coordinates: 41°43′N 20°44′E
- Country: North Macedonia
- Region: Polog
- Municipality: Mavrovo and Rostuša
- Elevation: 1,610 m (5,280 ft)

Population (2002)
  - Total: 142
- Time zone: UTC+1 (CET)
  - Summer (DST): UTC+2 (CEST)
- Car plates: GV
- Website: .

Vrben (Macedonian: Врбен, Albanian: Vërben) is a village in the municipality of Mavrovo and Rostuša, North Macedonia. The village situated at an altitude of 1610 m and belongs to the Upper Reka region located near the city of Debar, North Macedonia.

== Demographics ==
Vrben (Virbjeni) is recorded in the Ottoman defter of 1467 as a village in the ziamet of Reka which was under the authority of Karagöz Bey. The village had a total of nine households and the anthroponyms attested depict a mixed Albanian-Slavic character, with clear instances of Slavic influence or Slavicisation. This is encapsulated by the usage of patronyms with the Slavic suffix -ovići by individuals bearing Albanian first names (e.g., Ndrec Llazarovići). The patronymic Tanušovići also appears and is derived from the Albanian personal name Tanush with the addition of the aforementioned Slavic suffix.

According to Ethnographie des Vilayets D'Andrinople, de Monastir, et de Salonique, published in Constantinople in 1878, the village had a total of 300 houses, with 310 Muslim Albanians and 450 Orthodox Albanians.

In statistics gathered by Vasil Kanchov in 1900, the village of Vrben was inhabited by 300 Christian Albanians and 360 Muslim Albanians. In 1905 in statistics gathered by Dimitar Mishev Brancoff, Vrben was inhabited by 384 Albanians. According to statistics from the newspaper Debarski Glas in 1909 Vrben was "a Christian Arnaut village", where Usta Rade (? - 1909) lives, who was highly respected by Exarch Joseph I of Bulgaria. Christian Albanians were attracted by Serbian propaganda and according to the statistics of the newspaper "Debarski Glas" in 1911 there were 150 Albanian patriarchist houses in Vrben. There was a Serbian school in the village with 1 teacher, but no students.

The village is mentioned in 1927 in the Serbian newspaper "Vreme". In a report titled "Through Southern Serbia : Under Šar and under Korab", the journalist writing about the village considers it as being populated by "Serbs who only speak Albanian".

"We are in the district of Galičnik, in the pure Serbian villages: Duf, Gorno Jelovce, Vrben, Kičinica, Beličica, Brodec, where even under Turkey they kept their Serbian names and Orthodoxy, but the residents there do not know a single word of Serbian. They all speak only Albanian and call themselves Serbs. Their names and surnames are pure Serbian, their dress is like that from our Mavrovo, they celebrate the holidays, but they do not know any language other than Albanian. Now that the schools are open, the children can for the first time learn Serbian and teach in their mother tongue even their parents, who have forgotten it over the centuries"."

However, Salihi notes that this identification is due to the fact that the local Albanians adhered to the Orthodox Christian church, as opposed to reflecting ethno-linguistic identity.

According to a 1929 ethnographic map by Russian Slavist Afanasy Selishchev, Vrben was an Albanian village.

According to the 1942 Albanian census, Vrben was inhabited by 11 Muslim Albanians and 288 Serbophone Orthodox Albanians.

The Yugoslav census of 1953 recorded 171 people of whom 145 were Macedonians, 26 were Albanians and 3 others. The 1961 Yugoslav census recorded 331 people of whom were 283 Macedonians, 37 Albanians, 3 Turks and 8 others. The 1971 census recorded 231 people of whom were 203 Macedonians and 28 Albanians. The 1981 Yugoslav census recorded 234 people of whom were 195 Macedonians and 39 Albanians. The Macedonian census of 1994 recorded 180 people of whom 172 Macedonians and 8 Albanians. According to the 2002 census, the village had a total of 142 inhabitants. Ethnic groups in the village include:

- Macedonians 135
- Albanians 7

== Notable people ==
- Paskal Sotirovski, astrophysicist
- Selvie Saliu, politician
