= Ničpur =

Ničpur Ничпур Niçpur
- Village
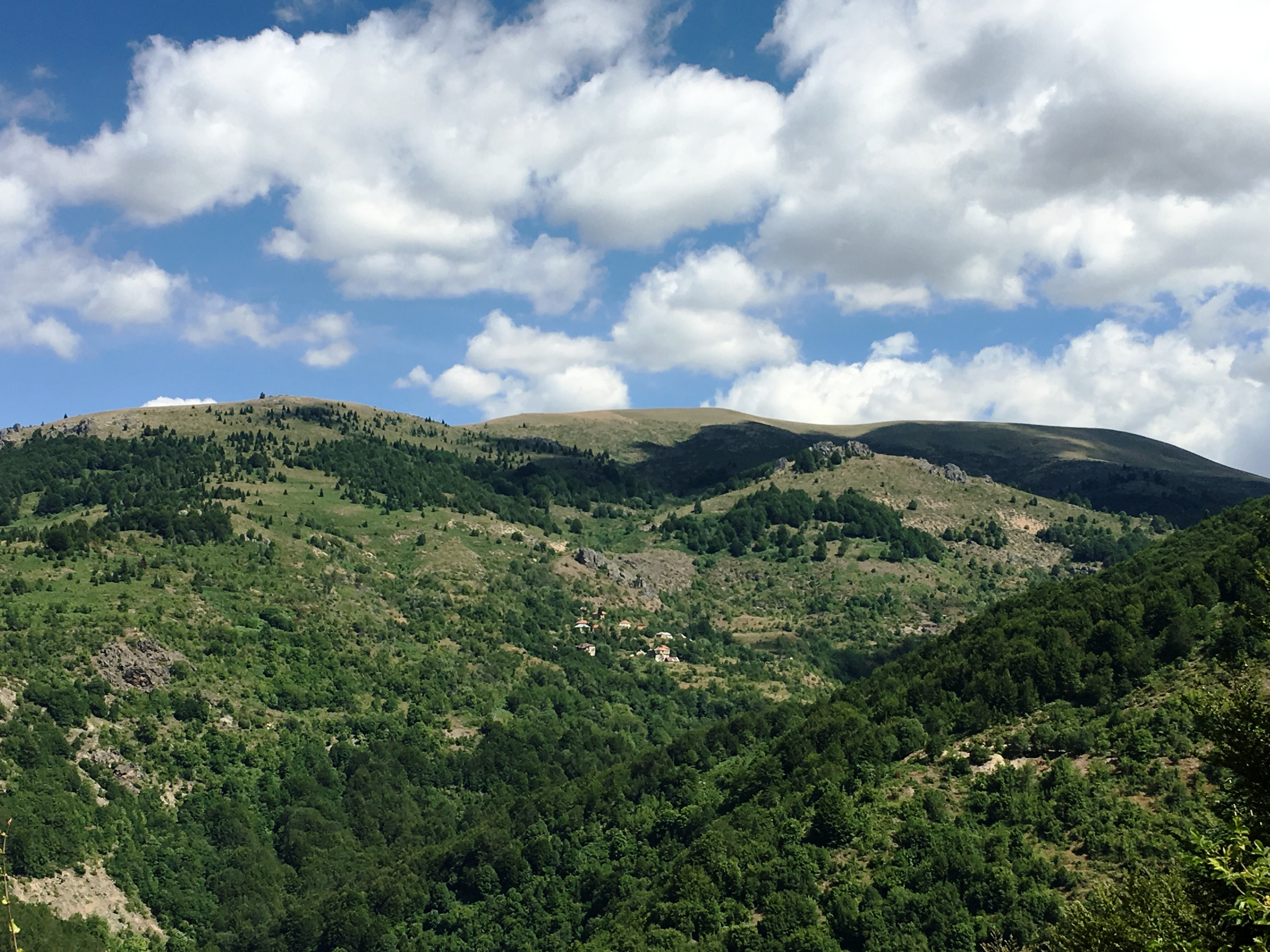
- Panoramic view of the village

- Location within North Macedonia
- Coordinates: 41°45′N 20°40′E
- Country: North Macedonia
- Region: Polog
- Municipality: Mavrovo and Rostuša

Population (2021)
  - Total: 5
- Time zone: UTC+1 (CET)
  - Summer (DST): UTC+2 (CEST)
- Car plates: GV
- Website: .

Ničpur (Macedonian: Ничпур, Albanian: Niçpur) is a village in the municipality of Mavrovo and Rostuša, North Macedonia.

== Demographics ==
Ničpur (Jençepor) is attested in the Ottoman defter of 1467 as a village in the ziamet of Reka which was under the authority of Karagöz Bey. The village had a total of eight households and the anthroponymy attested was Albanian in character. In the census of 1536/39, the village had 16 families and two bachelors. In 1583, the village of Niçpur had 20 households and eight bachelors, two looms, one mill and paid 1,000 akçe to the timarli every year. The inhabitants recorded exhibited Albanian and mixed Slavic-Albanian anthroponyms: (e.g Gjon Dano, Gjorçe Dano, Gjuro Gjon, Kole Gjurro, Stojko Kosta, Mitre Brajan etc).

In statistics gathered by Vasil Kanchov in 1900, the village of Ničpur was inhabited by 250 Christian Albanians and 220 Muslim Albanians.

According to the 2002 census, the village had a total of 13 inhabitants. Ethnic groups in the village include:

- Albanians 12
- Macedonians 1

As of the 2021 census, Ničpur had five residents with the following ethnic composition:

- Albanians 5
