= Volkovija =

Volkovija may refer to:

- Volkovija, Brvenica, North Macedonia
- Volkovija, Mavrovo and Rostuša, North Macedonia
