= Grekaj =

- Village
- Грекај
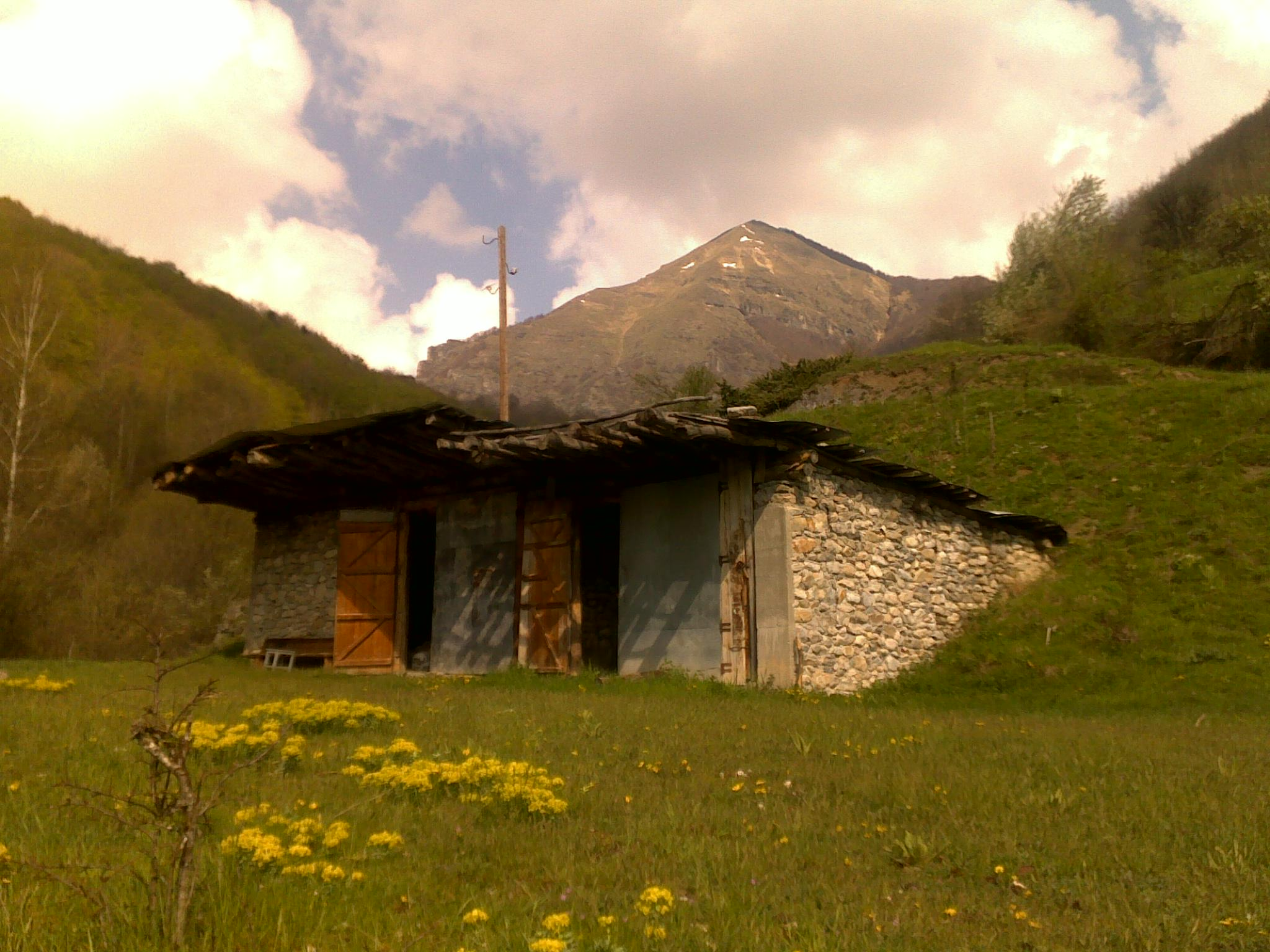

- Location within North Macedonia
- Coordinates: 41°43′N 20°35′E
- Country: North Macedonia
- Region: Polog
- Municipality: Mavrovo and Rostuša

Population (2021)
  - Total: 3
- Time zone: UTC+1 (CET)
  - Summer (DST): UTC+2 (CEST)
- Car plates: GV
- Website: .

Grekaj (Macedonian: Грекај, Albanian: Grekaj) is a village in the municipality of Mavrovo and Rostuša, North Macedonia.

== Demographics ==
Grekaj (Girqani) is attested in the Ottoman defter of 1536-1539 as a village in the ziamet of Reka. The village recorded 11 households. In 1583, the village counted 20 families. It paid the timar or spahi 1070 akçe per year and had 2 mills that worked all year round. The anthroponyms recorded were overwhelmingly Albanian in character, with instances of Slavicisation: (e.g Lazar Gjin, Petri Bogdan, Jovan Gjin, Keko Gjin, Keko Todor, Gjin Petko, Dede Bodin, Zaharia Gjin etc).

In statistics gathered by Vasil Kanchov in 1900, the village of Grekaj was inhabited by 25 Christian Albanians and 14 Muslim Albanians.

As of the 2021 census, Grekaj had 3 residents with the following ethnic composition:

- Albanians 3

According to the 2002 census, the village had a total of 20 inhabitants. Ethnic groups in the village include:

- Albanians 20
