= Trnica =

Trnica Трница Tërnicë
- Village
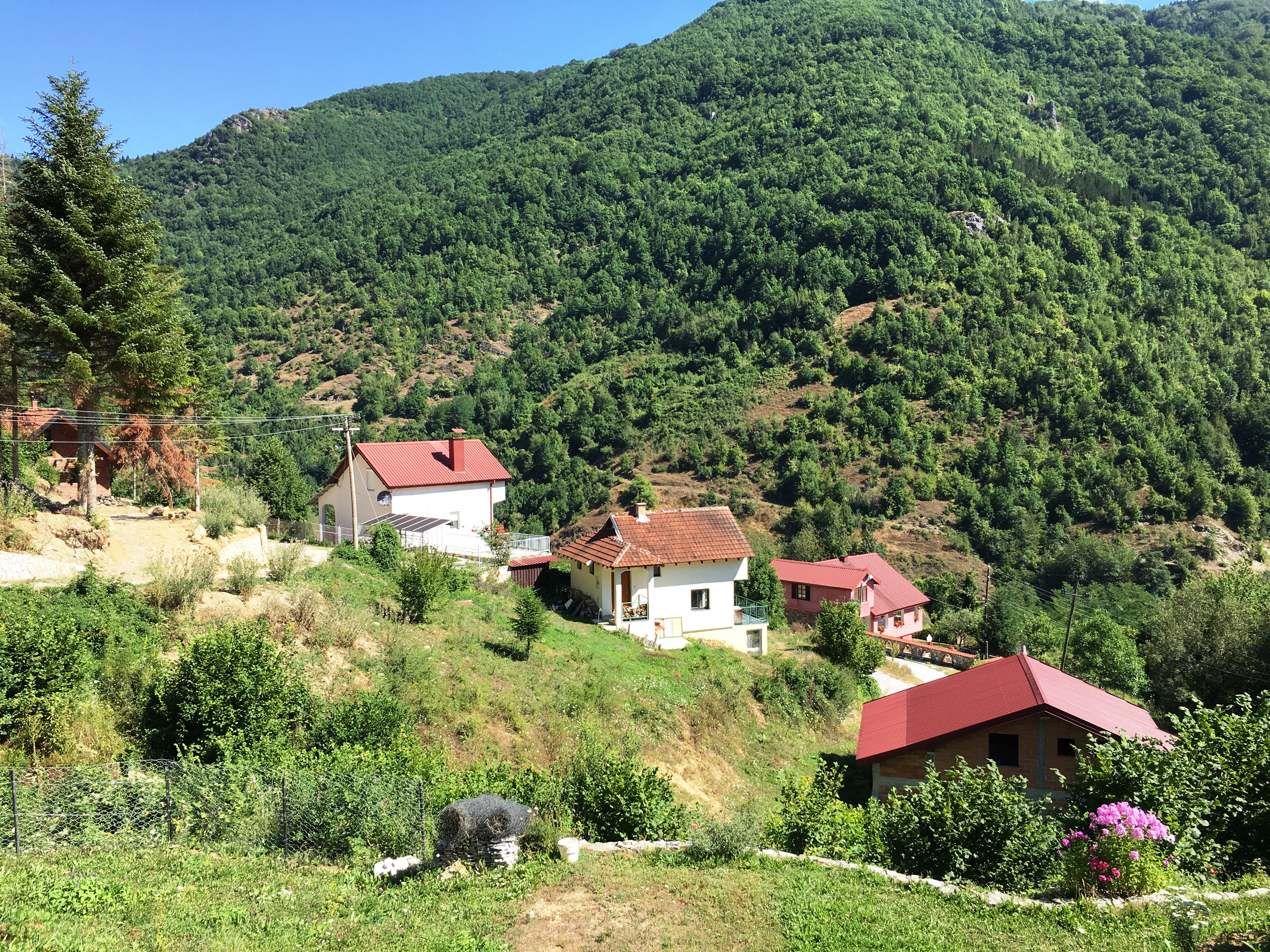

- Location within North Macedonia
- Coordinates: 41.711667°N 20.688056°E
- Country: North Macedonia
- Region: Polog
- Municipality: Mavrovo and Rostuša
- Time zone: UTC+1 (CET)
  - Summer (DST): UTC+2 (CEST)
- Website: .

Trnica (Macedonian: Трница, Albanian: Tërnicë) is a historic village in the municipality of Mavrovo and Rostuša, North Macedonia.

== History ==
Due to uprisings in the Upper Reka region, Trnica was burned down by Serbian and Bulgarian forces between 1912 and 1916.

== Demographics ==
Trnica (Terniçe) is attested in the Ottoman defter of 1467 as a village in the ziamet of Reka. The village had one household and the anthroponym recorded depict an Albanian character: Gjergj Andrija.

In statistics gathered by Vasil Kanchov in 1900, the village of Trnica was inhabited by 240 Muslim Albanians.

According to the 1942 Albanian census, Trnica was inhabited by 28 Muslim Albanians.

== Sources ==
- Osmani, Edibe Selimi (2012). Veshja autoktone e femrave të Rekës së Epërme [Authentic clothing of women from Reka e Epërme]. Skopje: Arbëria design. ISBN 9789989578281.
