= Bogdevo =

Bogdevo Богдево Bogdë
- Village
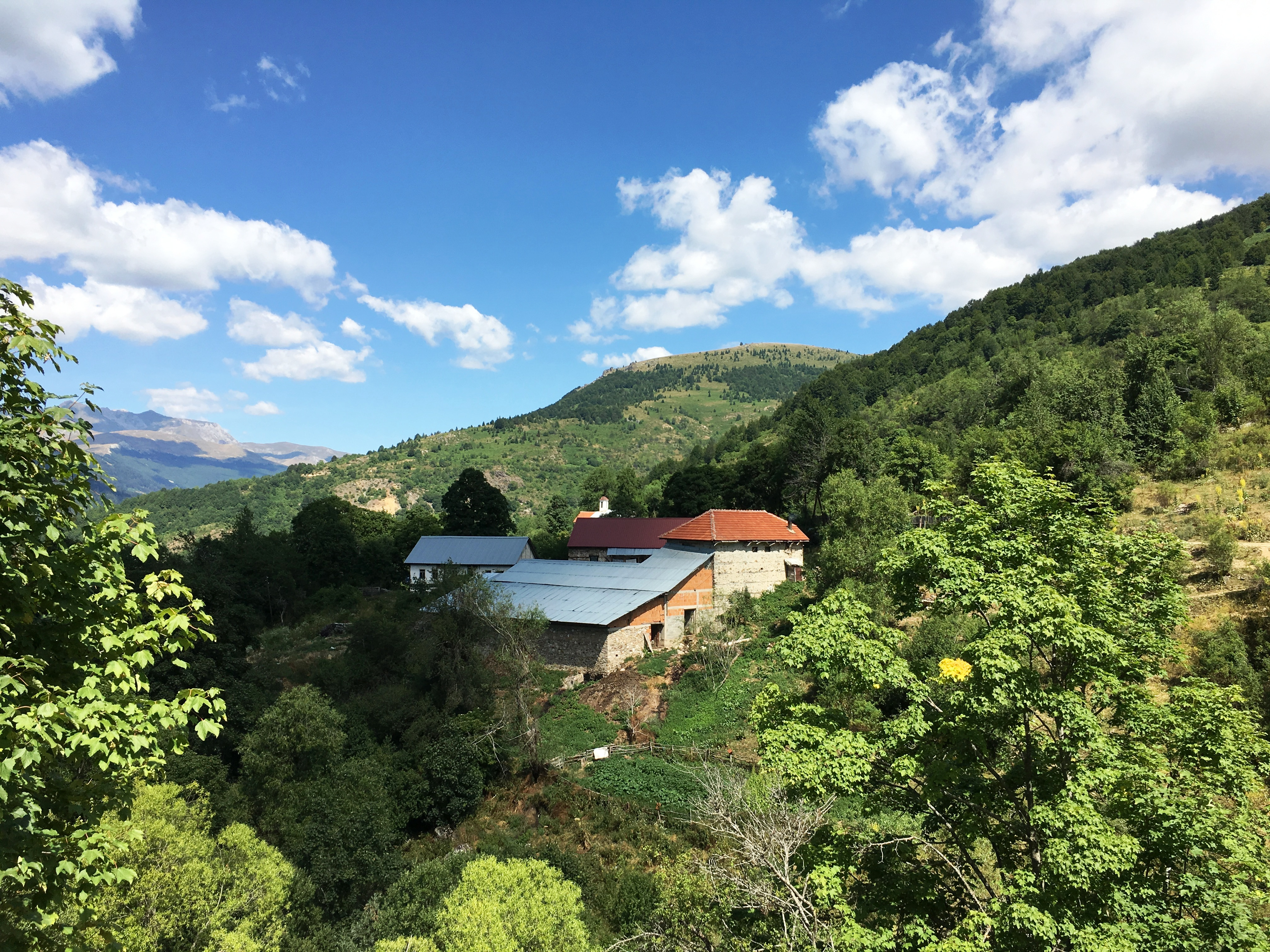
- Houses in the village Bogdevo

- Location within North Macedonia
- Coordinates: 41°45′N 20°42′E
- Country: North Macedonia
- Region: Polog
- Municipality: Mavrovo and Rostuša

Population (2021)
  - Total: 0
- Time zone: UTC+1 (CET)
  - Summer (DST): UTC+2 (CEST)
- Car plates: GV
- Website: .

Bogdevo (Macedonian: Богдево, Albanian: Bogdë) is a village in the municipality of Mavrovo and Rostuša, North Macedonia.

== Demographics ==
Bogdevo (Bogdo) is attested in the Ottoman defter of 1467 as a village in the ziamet of Reka. The village had 3 households and the anthroponyms recorded depict a mixed Slavic-Albanian character. In the 1519 census, the village was registered under the name Bogdevo, with 16 Christian families, the same number recorded in the defter of 1536–1539. In the 1583 census, the village counted 10 Christian families, and paid the timarli 955 akçe per year. The anthroponyms recorded were mixed Slavic-Albanian in character (e.g Nikolla Meto, Bogdan Marko, Gjin Pejo, Nikolla Pejo, Pejo Bogri, Pop Pejo, Petri Jove etc).

In statistics gathered by Vasil Kanchov in 1900, the village of Bogdevo was inhabited by 180 Christian Macedonians and 108 Muslim Albanians.

According to the 2002 census, the village had a total of 5 inhabitants. Ethnic groups in the village include:

- Albanians 5

As of the 2021 census, Bogdevo had zero residents.
