= Branislav Sinadinovski =

Macedonian politician and activist

Branislav Sinadinovski (died 5 February 2021), also known as Gjergj Pranga, was a Macedonian politician and author of Orthodox Albanian descent. He supported the idea of the Albanian Orthodox Church in North Macedonia.

== Biography ==
His father was Jakim Sinadinovski (mk) from the Leunovo, but his origin were from Beličica, in Upper Reka. Sinadinovski left Macedonia when he was young and returned after the breakup of Yugoslavia. He was part of some political parties like SDSM and VMRO-DPMNE. In 2014, Sinadinovski requested the establishment of "Religious Community of Orthodox Albanians in the Republic of Macedonia", which happened in 2015. As an adviser to the president of the Democratic Union for Integration, he had also suggested registering an Albanian Orthodox Church in the country, which was dismissed by a Macedonian bishop. In 2018, Sinadinovski was assaulted in Skopje. On 5 February 2021, Branislav Sinadinovski died.

== Sources ==
- Sinadinovski, Branislav (2016). Shqiptarët ortodoksë në Republikën e Maqedonisë. Universiteti Shtetëror i Tetovës. ISBN 9786082170343.
