= Volkovija, Mavrovo i Rostuše =

Volkovija Волковија Vallkavi
- Village
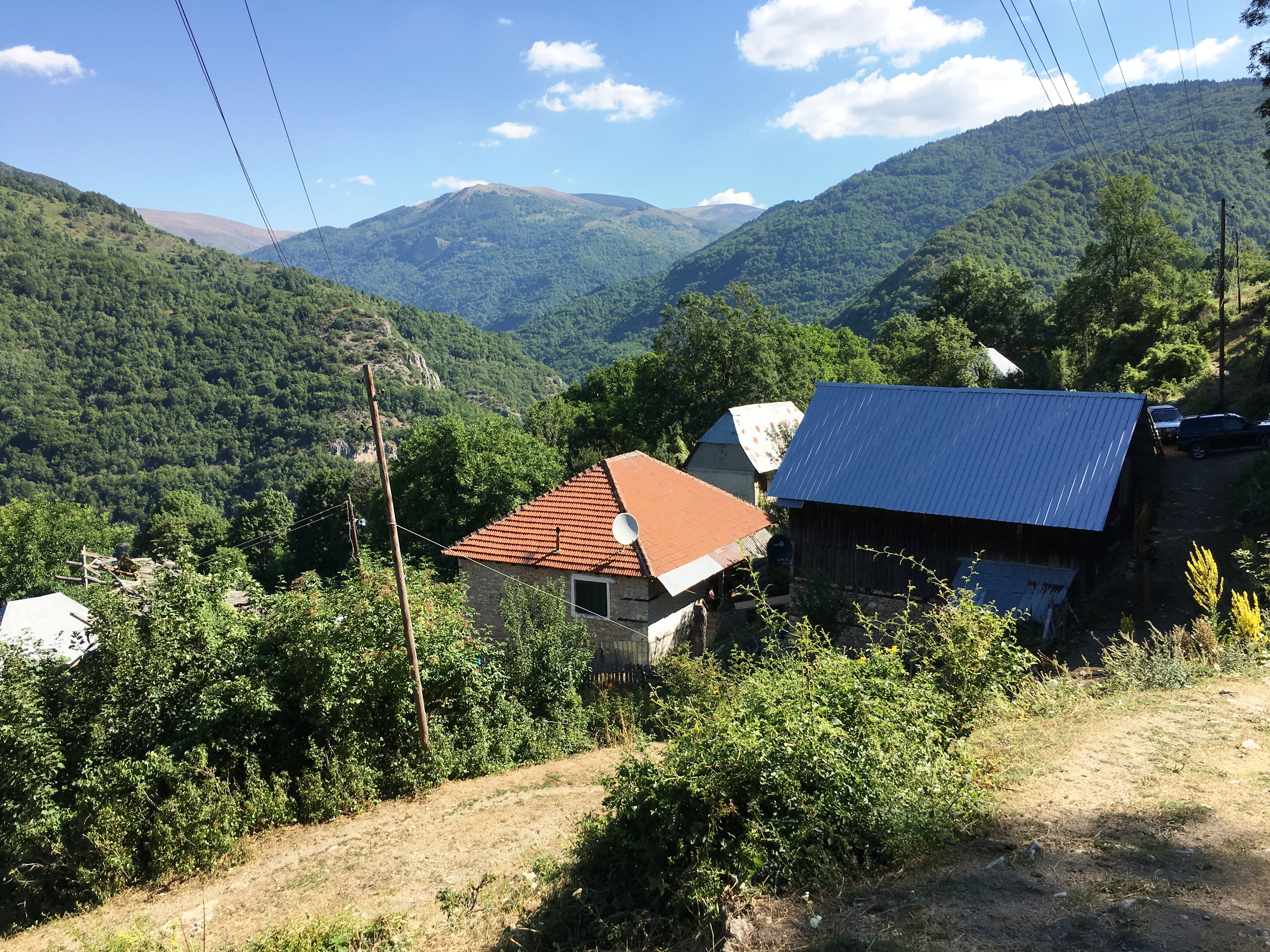
- Houses in the village Volkovija

- Location within North Macedonia
- Coordinates: 41°42′56″N 20°40′08″E
- Country: North Macedonia
- Region: Polog
- Municipality: Mavrovo and Rostuša

Population (2021)
  - Total: 21
- Time zone: UTC+1 (CET)
  - Summer (DST): UTC+2 (CEST)
- Car plates: GV
- Website: .

Volkovija (Macedonian: Волковија, Albanian: Vallkavi) is a village in the municipality of Mavrovo and Rostuša, North Macedonia.

== Demographics ==
Volkovija (Vukovja) is attested in the Ottoman defter of 1467 as a village in the ziamet of Reka which was under the authority of Karagöz Bey. The village had a total of six households and the anthroponymy recorded depicts an almost exclusively Albanian character: Progon Domi, Pop Radoslav, Kolë Domi, Kolë Domi the other, Andrije Domi, and Muzhava Domi. In the 1519 census, there were 13 Christian families registered. The village of Volkovi in the years 1519-1583 was a derven. In the 1583 census, the village counted 40 Christian families and paid 2514 akçe per year to the timar The anthroponyms recorded were mixed Slavic-Albanian in character (e.g. Pejo Gjon, Dimitri Gjursan, Stojan Pejo, Kojo Pejo, Dimtri Stojan etc.).

According to the 2002 census, the village had a total of 89 inhabitants. Ethnic groups in the village include:

- Albanians 80
- Macedonians 9

As of the 2021 census, Volkovija had 21 residents with the following ethnic composition:

- Albanians 15
- Persons for whom data are taken from administrative sources 6
