= Lukovica, Želino =

Lukovica
- Village
- Луковица
- Location within North Macedonia
- Coordinates: 41°53′N 21°09′E
- Country: North Macedonia
- Region: Polog
- Municipality: Želino

Population (2002)
  - Total: 47
- Time zone: UTC+1 (CET)
  - Summer (DST): UTC+2 (CEST)
- Car plates: TE
- Website: .

Lukovica (Macedonian: Луковица) is a village in the municipality of Želino, North Macedonia.

== Demographics ==
In the 19th century some villagers from the Upper Reka region migrated to Lukovica as Orthodox Christians and only converted thereafter to Islam. In statistics gathered by Vasil Kanchov in 1900, the village of Lukovica was inhabited by 106 Muslim Albanians and 105 Christian Bulgarians.

According to the 2002 census, the village had a total of 47 inhabitants. Ethnic groups in the village include:

- Macedonians 47

According to the 2021 census, the village had a total of 7 inhabitants.

- Macedonians 7
