= Buzalkovo =

Buzalkovo Бузалково Buzallkovë
- Village
- Location within North Macedonia
- Coordinates: 41°44′N 21°41′E
- Country: North Macedonia
- Region: Vardar
- Municipality: Veles

Population (2002)
  - Total: 1,456
- Time zone: UTC+1 (CET)
  - Summer (DST): UTC+2 (CEST)
- Car plates: VE
- Website: .

Buzalkovo (Macedonian: Бузалково, Albanian: Buzallakovë) is a village in the municipality of Veles, North Macedonia.

== Demographics ==
On the 1927 ethnic map of Leonhard Schulze-Jena, the village is written as Buselikovo and no ethnic marker was given.

According to the 2002 census, the village had a total of 1456 inhabitants. Ethnic groups in the village include:

- Albanians 1456
- Turks 3
- Macedonians 2
- Others 8
