= Klukovec =

Klukovec Клуковец Kukavec
- Village
- Location within North Macedonia
- Coordinates: 41°42′N 21°41′E
- Country: North Macedonia
- Region: Vardar
- Municipality: Veles

Population (2002)
  - Total: 193
- Time zone: UTC+1 (CET)
  - Summer (DST): UTC+2 (CEST)
- Car plates: VE
- Website: .

Klukovec (Macedonian: Клуковец, Albanian: Kukavec) is a village in the municipality of Veles, North Macedonia.

== Demographics ==
According to the 2002 census, the village had a total of 193 inhabitants. Ethnic groups in the village include:

- Albanians 193
