= Nivište =

Nivište Нивиште Nivisht
- Village
- Location within North Macedonia
- Coordinates: 41°44′N 20°35′E
- Country: North Macedonia
- Region: Polog
- Municipality: Mavrovo and Rostuša

Population (2021)
  - Total: 0
- Time zone: UTC+1 (CET)
  - Summer (DST): UTC+2 (CEST)
- Car plates: GV
- Website: .

Nivište (Macedonian: Нивиште, Albanian: Nivisht) is an uninhabited village in the municipality of Mavrovo and Rostuša, North Macedonia.

== Demographics ==
In statistics gathered by Vasil Kanchov in 1900, the village of Nivište (Nivishta) was inhabited by 170 Christian Albanians and 180 Muslim Albanians.

As of the 2021 census, Nivište had zero residents.

According to the 2002 census, the village had a total of seven inhabitants. Ethnic groups in the village include:

- Albanians 7
