= Orḱuše =

Orḱuše Орќуше Orqushë
- Village
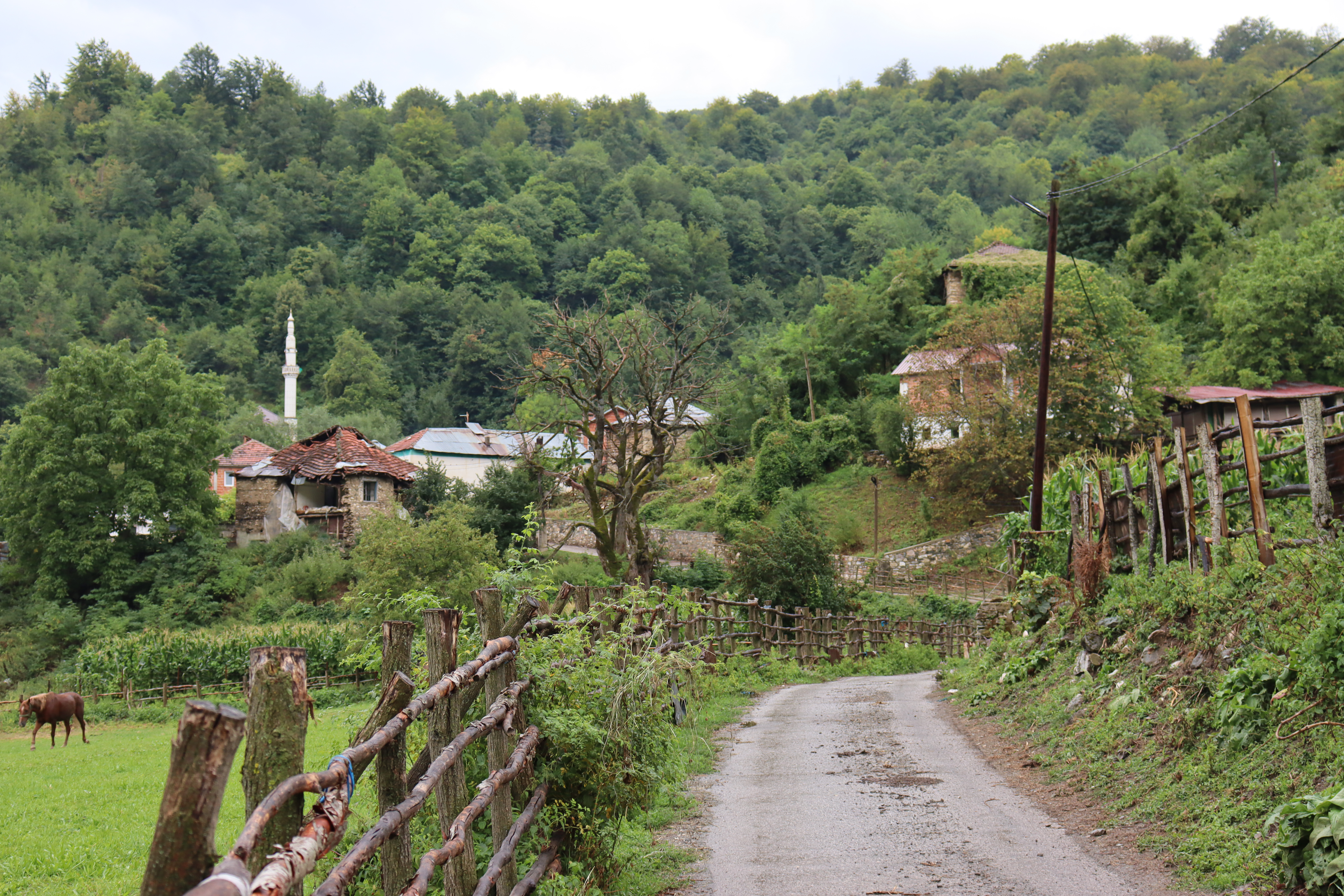
- View of the village

- Location within North Macedonia
- Coordinates: 41°45′N 20°48′E
- Country: North Macedonia
- Region: Polog
- Municipality: Mavrovo and Rostuša

Population (2002)
  - Total: 15
- Time zone: UTC+1 (CET)
  - Summer (DST): UTC+2 (CEST)
- Car plates: GV
- Website: .

Orḱuše (Macedonian: Орќуше, Albanian: Orqushë) is a village in the municipality of Mavrovo and Rostuša, North Macedonia.

== Demographics ==
In statistics gathered by Vasil Kanchov in 1900, the village of Orḱuše was inhabited by 14 Christian Macedonians and 100 Muslim Macedonians.

Orthodox Macedonians lived in Orkushe until the second half of the 19th century, when the village had 15, and even 16 Orthodox houses. Later, some of them died out, and some moved away. The move happened due to attacks by the Albanians that were colonizing the area during that era.

According to the 2002 census, the village had a total of 15 inhabitants. Ethnic groups in the village include:

- Albanians 15
