= Zavojsko =

Zavojsko Завојско Zavojskë
- Village
- Location within North Macedonia
- Coordinates: 41.717778°N 20.58°E
- Country: North Macedonia
- Region: Polog
- Municipality: Mavrovo and Rostuša
- Time zone: UTC+1 (CET)
  - Summer (DST): UTC+2 (CEST)
- Website: .

Zavojsko (Macedonian: Завојско, Albanian: Zavojskë) is a historic village in the municipality of Mavrovo and Rostuša, North Macedonia.

== History ==
Due to uprisings in the Upper Reka region, Zavojsko was burned down by Serbian and Bulgarian forces between 1912 and 1916.

== Demographics ==
In statistics gathered by Vasil Kanchov in 1900, the village of Zavojsko (Zalvaysko) was inhabited by 35 Christian Albanians.

== Sources ==
- Osmani, Edibe Selimi (2012). Veshja autoktone e femrave të Rekës së Epërme [Authentic clothing of women from Reka e Epërme]. Skopje: Arbëria design. ISBN 9789989578281.
