= Reka (region) =

Geographical region in Macedonia

Reka (Macedonian: Река, Albanian: Reka) is a geographical region in Macedonia, which encompasses a quadrangle with Albania in the west, the town of Debar and the Mavrovo mountain, and Kičevo in North Macedonia in the east. The region is home to a demographically mixed population of Mijaks (Macedonians; Torbeši or Macedonian Muslims) and Albanians. The sub-regions (ethnographic/geographic regions) of Reka are Mala (Small), Dolna (Lower) and Golema (Large) or Gorna (Upper). The name Reka is Slavic in origin meaning "river".

The adjacent Lower Reka region is inhabited by Macedonian Muslims (known as "Torbeši" or "Turks" i.e. Muslims), whereas a minority are Orthodox Macedonians. Small Reka, meanwhile, is inhabited solely by Orthodox Macedonians and the populations of Small and Lower Reka belong to the Slavic ethnographic group of Mijaks, who speak the Macedonian Reka dialect. In Upper Reka, Muslim Albanians have become its remaining population, after the Albanian speaking Orthodox Christians, who in the modern period self identify as Macedonians, migrated from the region.

In the west of Reka is the region of Lumë, which extends in both Kosovo and Albania.
