= Ziamet =

Form of land tenure in the Ottoman Empire

Ziamet (Turkish: zeamet) was a form of land tenure in the Ottoman Empire between the 14th and 16th centuries, consisting in grant of lands or revenues by a sultan to an individual in compensation for their services, especially military services. The ziamet holder acted as an agent of the central Ottoman government in supervising the possession, transfer, and rental of lands within his territory, and collecting tax revenue, in return for military service. A timar was not necessarily made up of contiguous property but could consist of lands scattered among different villages. The ziamet system was introduced by Osman I, who granted land tenure to his troops. Later, this system was expanded by Murad I for his Sipahi (cavalry).

The Seljuq sultanate utilized ziamets in an effort to invest provincial governors, who were also made subordinate chiefs in the military regime. In this pre-Ottoman period, timars were used with other tactics, such as building caravansaries, in an effort to sedentarize nomadic groups. The Ottoman state later took on this timar system after conquering Anatolia, and it represented just one of several institutions adopted from the Seljuq sultanate. The Ottoman Empire came into disarray due to problems asserting central government control during the 16th and 17th centuries. Ziamets of Ottoman cavalry were enlarged and turned over to a smaller number of owners, with a longer tenure. Thus, authority in provincial areas turned to police authority as local administrations dissolved, and ziamets were converted into tax farms or iqta. This conversion proved to be the first step to growing provincial control in the Ottoman Empire, as economic decline in the empire gave these stronger provincial governors the chance to assert power.
