= Polog =

Valley in North Macedonia

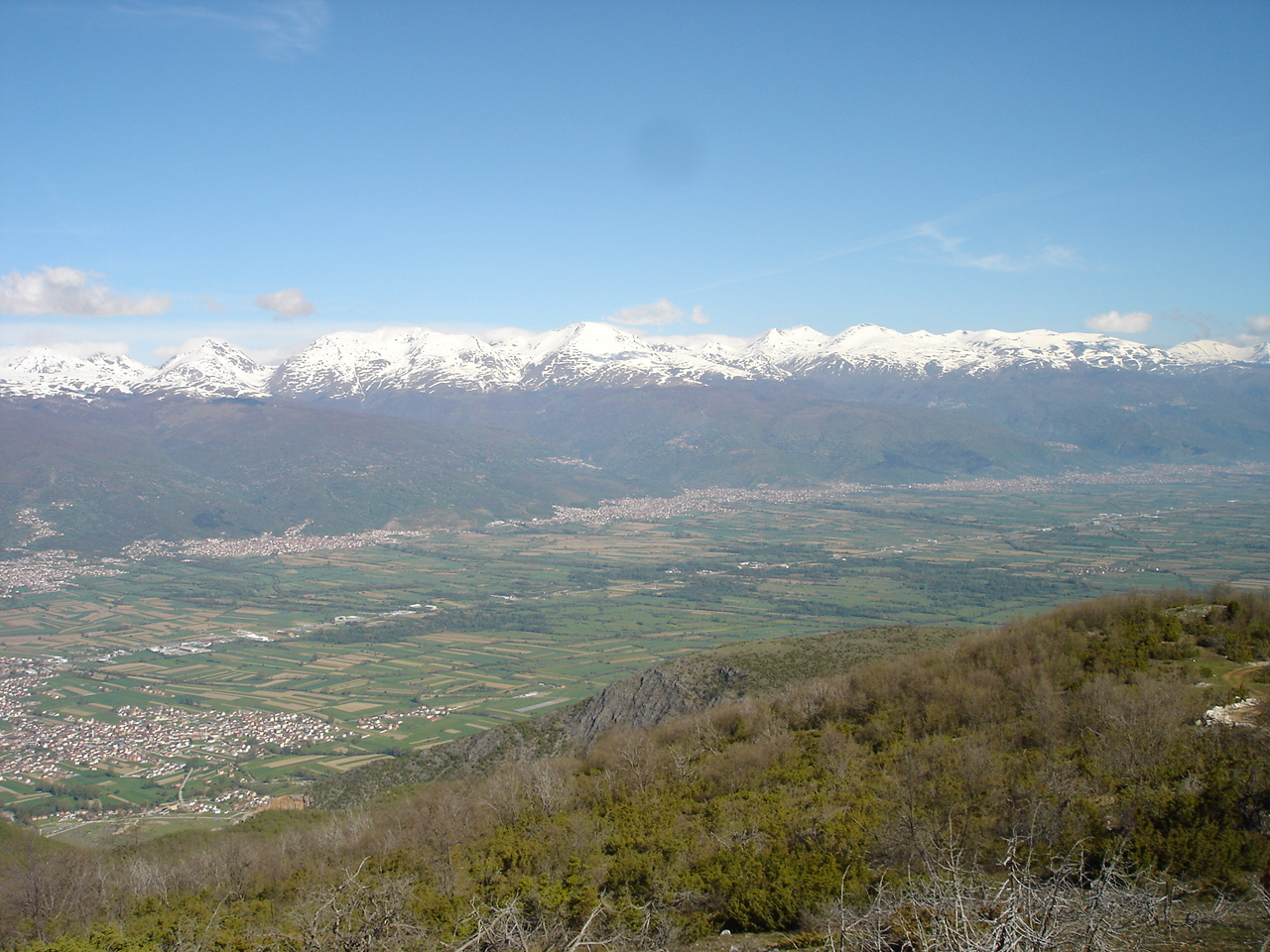
Polog Valley, as seen from Suva Gora mountain

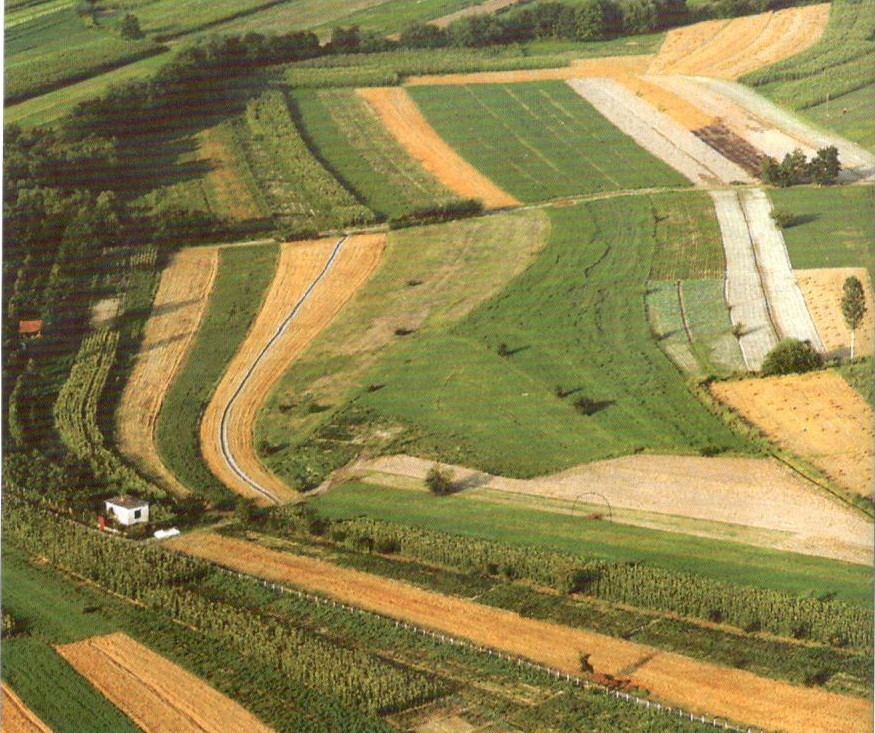
Fields in Polog Valley

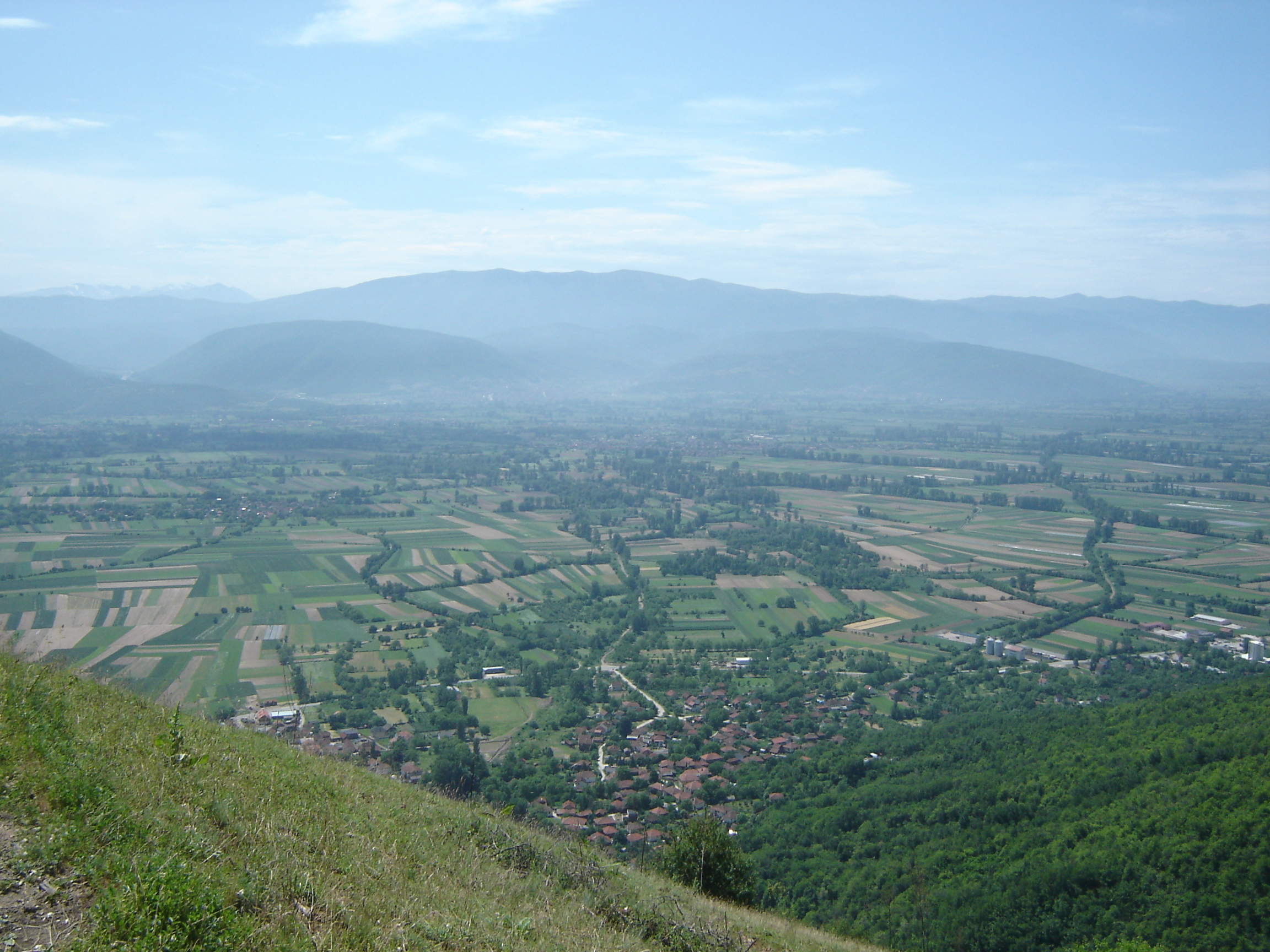
Polog Valley, as seen from Šar Mountain.

Polog (Macedonian: Полог, romanized: Polog; Albanian: Pollog), also known as the Polog Valley (Macedonian: Полошка Котлина, romanized: Pološka Kotlina; Albanian: Lugina e Pollogut) is located in the north-western part of North Macedonia, near the border with Kosovo.

It is divided into Upper Polog (Macedonian: Горен Полог; Albanian: Pollogu i Epërm) and Lower Polog (Macedonian: Долен Полог; Albanian: Pollogu i Poshtëm). Tetovo and Gostivar are the largest populated towns in this valley and Albanians form an ethnic majority in the region.

Polog Statistical Region is named after the valley.

== Etymology ==
The name Polog (Cyrillic: Полог) is Slavic in origin, most likely coming from the Slavic word pole (Cyrillic: поле) meaning "field".

== History ==
=== Antiquity ===
The Polog Valley and the surrounding regions belonged to the Illyro-Dardanian cultural sphere of influence. Throughout antiquity, the Polog valley and its main settlements - Oaeneum and Draudacum - were ruled and inhabited by the Illyrian Penestae tribe as well as the Dardanians. The Polog region served as a border region between the Dardanians and the lands of the Paeonians. In the period of 800–550 BC, the Dardani broke into Pelagonia via Oaeneum (Tetovo) and Draudacum (Gostivar) and pushed the Phrygian Bryges there into the northern hills.

During the Roman conquests of the Balkans, the Illyrian king Gentius was allied with the Romans against the Ancient Macedonians in 171 BCE. By 170 BCE, the Illyrians and the Romans, led by Appius Claudius, were on the verge of victory. However, Gentius changed sides in 169 BCE and allied himself with Perseus of Macedon, leading his army to a victory over the Romans in Uskana by way of Oaeneum in the Polog region. In 169 BCE, Oaeneum was conquered by the Romans, whom the Penestae were generally allied with. After the conquest of Uskana, Perseus of Macedon captured Draudacum and Oaeneum, thereby subduing the Polog region temporarily. However, by 168 BCE, Gentius and Perseus were both defeated by the Romans and the Polog Valley region became a part of the Roman province of Illyricum.

=== Roman period ===
The Polog region remained within Illyricum until Diocletian's reforms, when it became a part of Epirus Nova in the 4th century AD. Christianity spread to the Polog region during the later period of Roman rule and reached the region relatively early. St Paul preached the Gospel in the region.

=== Middle Ages ===
The earliest references to the division of Polog in what is today "lower" and "upper" can be found in the Alexiad written by Anna Komnene when she mentions two Pologs, and the earliest records to the division of Polog into specifically "lower" and "upper" in the 12th century. Serbian medieval sources also make a distinction between a "lower" and "upper" Polog but most commonly they refer to "the two Pologs", the region was put under firm control of the Serbian state in the reign of King Milutin where the first cases of pronoia in the Serbian state were recorded Some of the earliest recorded settlements in Polog are from the 11th century with only one having the rank of city, Gradec, other settlements recorded in the 13th century are Tetovo, Banica/i, Rečica, Lisec, Točil, Leskov- jane, Nerašte, Radeevo. Of these settlements Htetovo would become the central hub of the region, today known as Tetovo. Because of the famous Holy Mother of God monastery in the vicinity the city will experience rapid progress, while the previously larger cities of Gradec and Lešok would stagnate and become villages. The region including the city of Tetovo would remain under the dominance of the Serbs until the arrival of the Ottomans. Between the years 1348–1353, Albanians are mentioned by Serbian king Stefan Dušan as farmers and soldiers in the district of Tetovo within the Polog region. In 1337, Dušan restored the Monastery of St Mary (Lešok Monastery) and gifted the monastery the local Albanian villages in the region, as well as the Nanov Dol highlands. Dušan barred everyone, particularly the Albanians, from grazing the sheep in these highlands.

=== Ottoman period ===
The region was eventually conquered by the Ottoman Empire, but would become a border region between the Ottomans and the Albanian League of Lezhë that was headed by Skanderbeg during Skanderbeg's Rebellion. Skanderbeg and the Albanians would win numerous victories over the Ottoman Turks in the Pollog region, such as the Battle of Polog in 1453 - where a force of 14,000 Ottomans under Ibrahim Pasha was destroyed - or another battle in 1462, when a force of 18,000 Ottomans under Isuf bey were yet again defeated by Skanderbeg and the Albanians.

Polog and its vicinity including the city of Tetovo would be given to Pasha Yigit after its conquest in 1392 alongside Skopje and would be part of the Kalkendelen kaza which was an affiliated kaza of the Skopje Sandjak.

== Demographics ==
After the expulsion of up to 70,000 Ottoman Muslims from the former Sanjak of Nish in 1877–1878, several families of Albanian Muhaxhirs settled in the Pollog Valley region.

Albanian arrivals from the Upper Reka region in the late Ottoman era began to settle amongst the wider, existent Albanian population of the Pollog Valley; migrants from Upper Reka relocated to the following villages in Upper Pollog: Čegrane, Forino, Korito, Balin Dol, Malo Turčane, Dolna Banjica, Sretkovo, Novo Selo, Rečane, Vrutok, Pečkovo, Zdunje, Vrapčište, Kalište and Gradec. In Lower Pollog, these migrants settled in: Gorno Sedlarce, Rakovec, Žerovjane, Radiovce, Tenovo, Lukovica, Sedlarevo and Gurgurnica.

In 1912–1913, there were 43,230 Albanians living in the Pollog Valley region.

According to a 1974 study by sociologist Ilija Josifovski on the ethnic Macedonian, Turkish, and Albanian inhabitants in the villages of the region, 95 percent of Albanian and Macedonian and 84 percent of Turkish heads of households did not let their sons marry girls of different ethnicities.

== See also ==
- Diocese of Polog and Kumanovo
- Eparchy of Polog and Kumanovo

== Sources ==
- Mirčevska, Mirjana P. (2007). Verbalni i neverbalni etnički simboli vo Gorna Reka [Verbal and non-verbal ethnic symbols in Upper Reka]. Skopje: Institut za Etnologija i Antropologija. ISBN 978-9989-668-66-1.
