= Belovište =

Belovište Беловиште Turçan i Madh
- Village
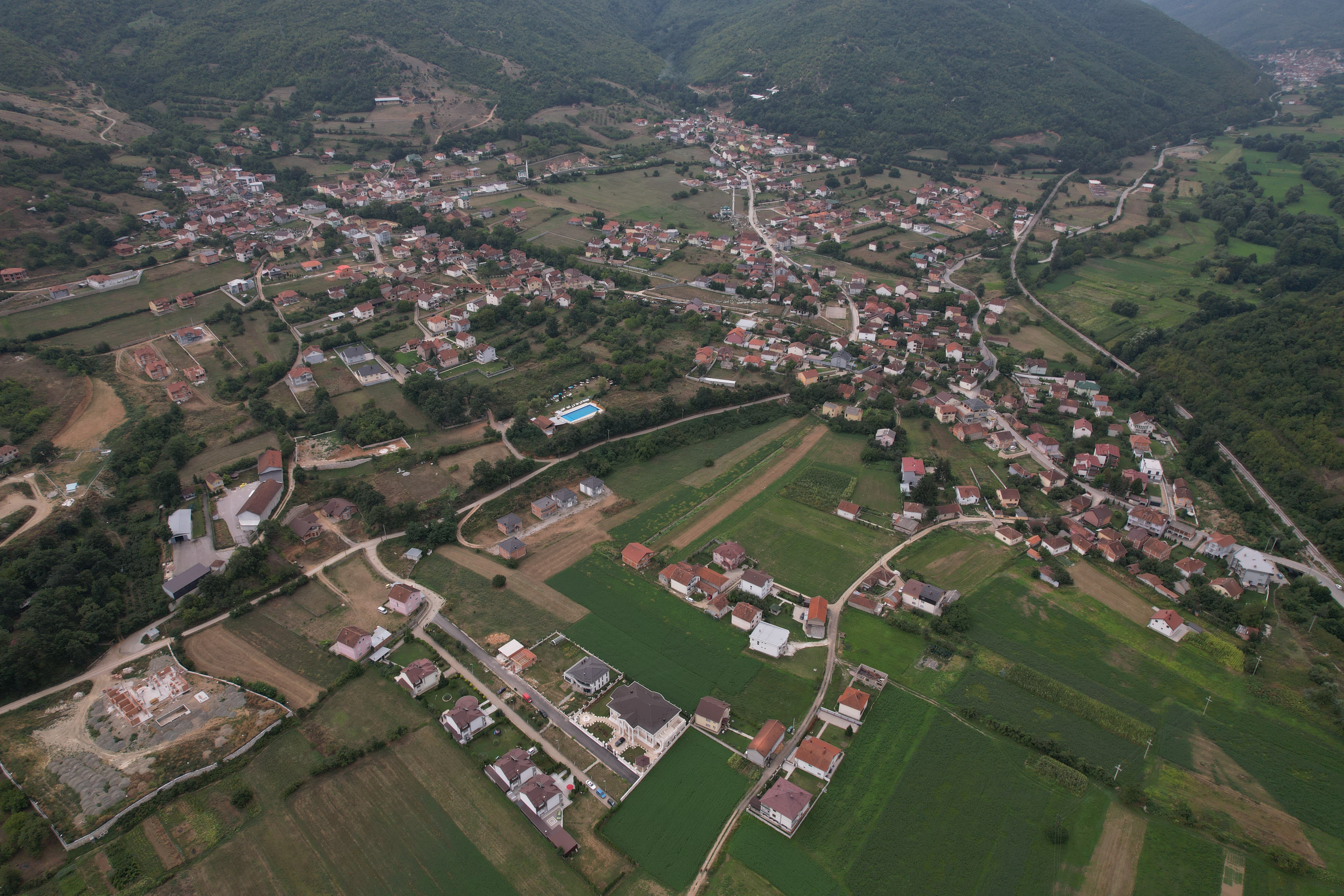
- Airview of the village

- Location within North Macedonia
- Coordinates: 41°46′32″N 20°56′08″E
- Country: North Macedonia
- Region: Polog
- Municipality: Gostivar

Population (2002)
  - Total: 2,267
- Time zone: UTC+1 (CET)
  - Summer (DST): UTC+2 (CEST)
- Car plates: GV
- Website: .

Belovište (Macedonian: Беловиште), until 1945 Golemo Turčane (Macedonian: Големо Турчане, Albanian: Turçan i Madh) is a village in the municipality of Gostivar, North Macedonia.

== History ==
Belovište is attested in the 1467/68 Ottoman tax registry (defter) for the Nahiyah of Kalkandelen. The village had a total of 80 Christian households, 5 widows and 2 bachelors.

== Demographics ==
According to the 2002 census, the village had a total of 2267 inhabitants. Ethnic groups in the village include:

- Albanians 1418
- Macedonians 832
- Romani 5
- Bosniaks 1
- Others 11

According to the 1942 Albanian census, Belovište was inhabited by 0 Muslim Albanians and 380 Serbs.
