= Reč, Gostivar =

Reč Реч Reç
- Village
- Location within Macedonia
- Coordinates: 41.784722°N 20.636389°E
- Country: North Macedonia
- Region: Polog
- Municipality: Gostivar

Population (2002)
  - Total: 0
  - Density: 2.22/km^{2} (5.74/sq mi)
- Time zone: UTC+1 (CET)
  - Summer (DST): UTC+2 (CEST)
- Car plates: GV
- Website: .

Reč (Macedonian: Реч; Albanian: Reç) is a historical village in the municipality of Gostivar, North Macedonia. It is part of the region of Upper Reka.

== History ==
Due to uprisings in the Upper Reka region, Reč was burned down by Serbian and Bulgarian forces between 1912–1916.

== Demographics ==
According to the 2002 census, the village had no inhabitants.

According to Ethnography of the Adrianople, Monastir and Salonika vilayets, Strezimir in 1873 had 30 households with 96 Orthodox Albanians.

In statistics gathered by Vasil Kanchov in 1900, the village was inhabited by 140 Muslim Albanians and 150 Christian Albanians.

== Sources ==
- Osmani, Edibe Selimi (2012). Veshja autoktone e femrave të Rekës së Epërme [Authentic clothing of women from Reka e Epërme]. Skopje: Arbëria design. ISBN 9789989578281.
