= Čajle =

Čajle: Macedonian: Чајле; Albanian: Çajlë
- Village
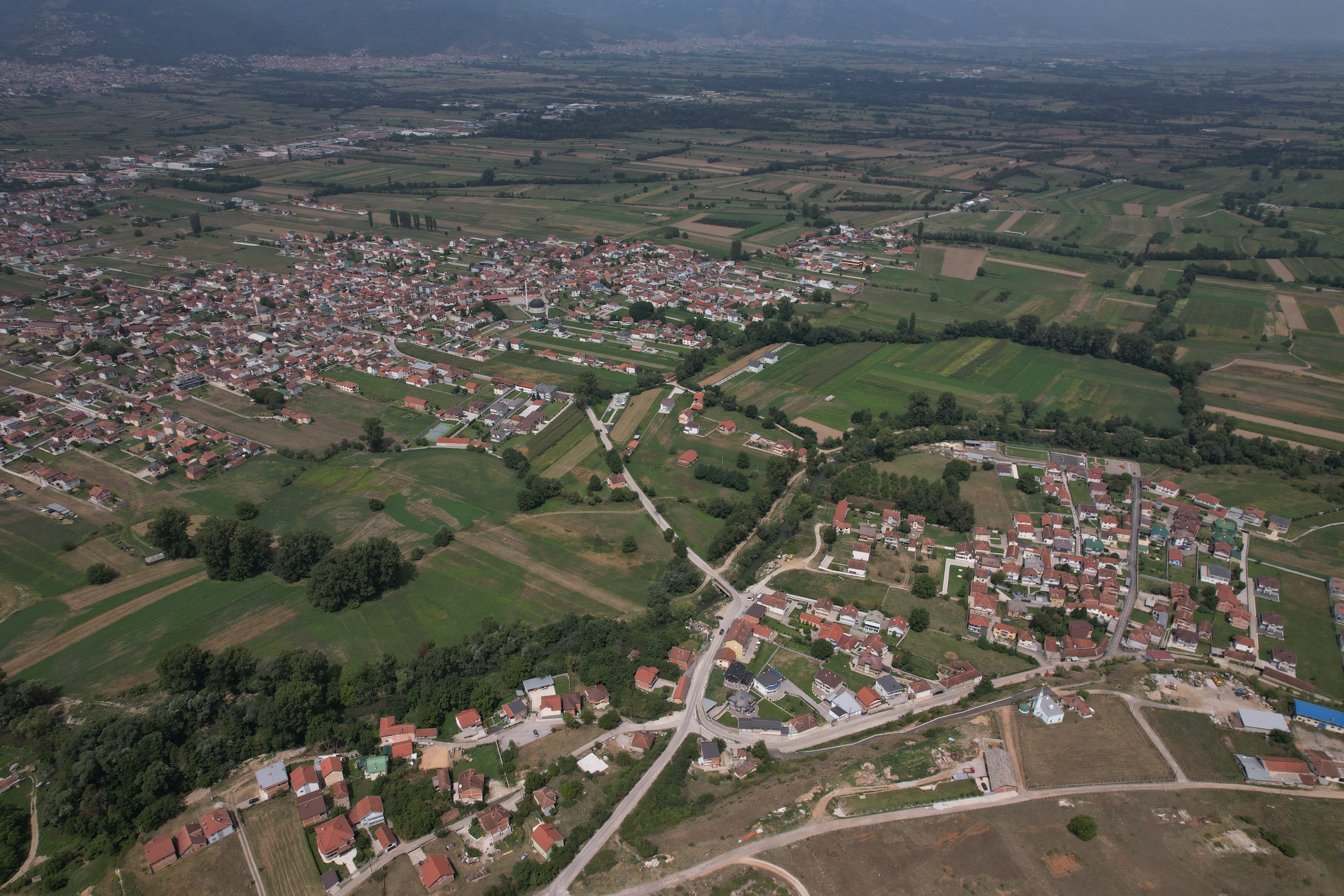
- Airview of the village

- Location within North Macedonia
- Coordinates: 41°48′N 20°56′E
- Country: North Macedonia
- Region: Polog
- Municipality: Gostivar

Government
  - Municipality president: Sinan Elezi

Population (2021)
  - Total: 1,236
- Time zone: UTC+1 (CET)
  - Summer (DST): UTC+2 (CEST)
- Car plates: GV
- Website: .

Čajle (Macedonian: Чајле, Albanian: Çajlë) is a village in the municipality of Gostivar, North Macedonia.

== History ==
Čajle is attested in the 1467/68 Ottoman tax registry (defter) for the Nahiyah of Kalkandelen. The village had a total of 13 Christian households and one bachelor. According to it, Čajle exhibits Christian Slavic anthroponomy.

== Demographics ==
As of the 2021 census, Čajle had 1,236 residents with the following ethnic composition:

- Albanians 1,161
- Persons for whom data are taken from administrative sources 72
- Macedonians 3

According to the 2002 census, the village had a total of 3070 inhabitants. Ethnic groups in the village include:

- Albanians 3028
- Turks 3
- Macedonians 1
- Others 38

According to the 1942 Albanian census, Čajle was inhabited by 929 Muslim Albanians and 241 Serbs.
