= Gorna Ǵonovica =

Gorna Ǵonovica Горна Ѓоновица Gjonovic e Epërme
- Village
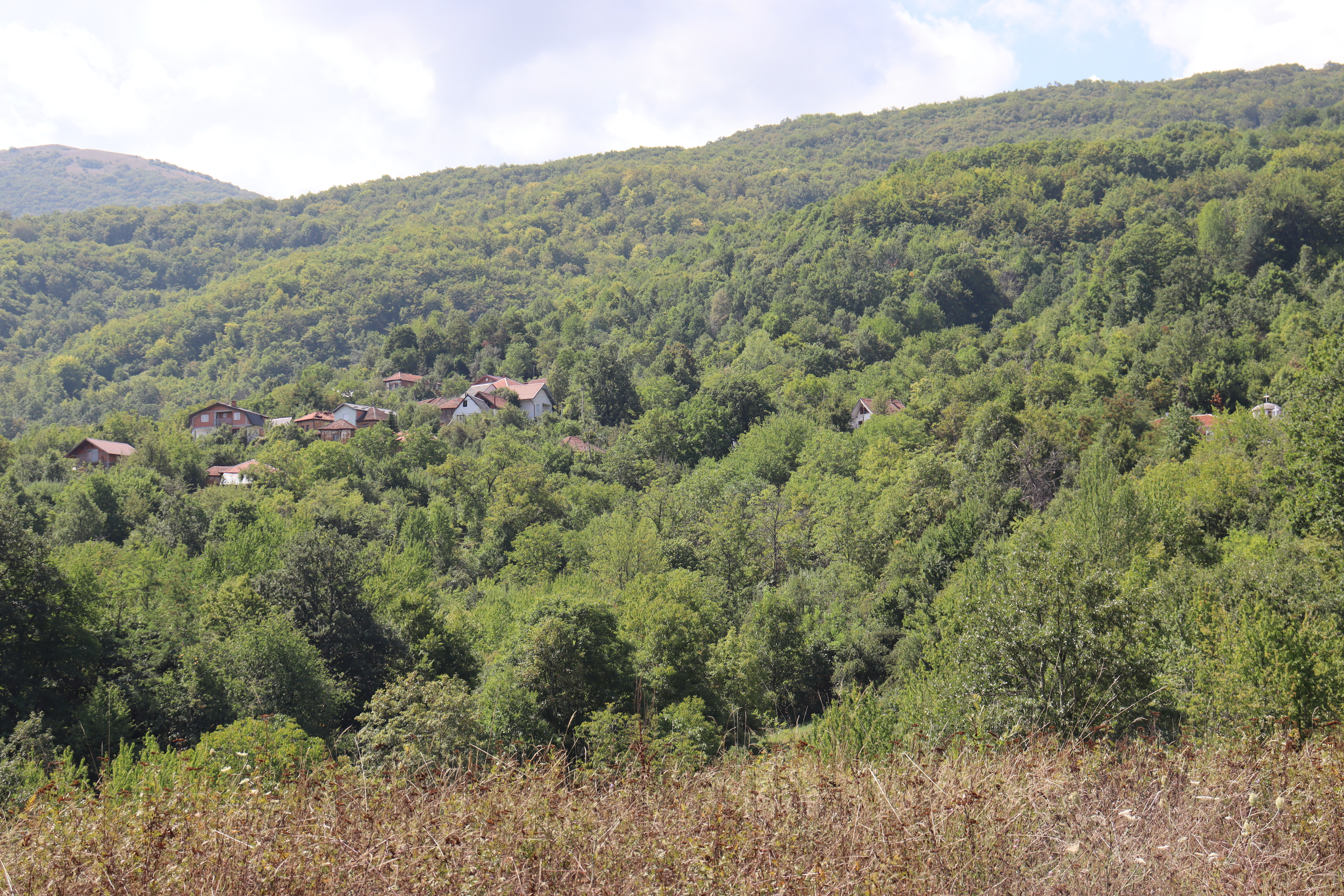
- View of the village

- Location within North Macedonia
- Coordinates: 41.708333°N 20.908056°E
- Country: North Macedonia
- Region: Polog
- Municipality: Gostivar

Population (2021)
  - Total: 40
- Time zone: UTC+1 (CET)
  - Summer (DST): UTC+2 (CEST)
- Car plates: GV
- Website: .

Gorna Ǵonovica (Macedonian: Горна Ѓоновица, Albanian: Gjonovic e Epërme) is a village in the municipality of Gostivar, North Macedonia.

== Name ==
The name stems from the Albanian name Gjon plus the Slavic suffix ov/ica.

== Demographics ==
As of the 2021 census, Gorna Ǵonovica had 40 residents with the following ethnic composition:

- Albanians 39
- Persons for whom data are taken from administrative sources 1

According to the 2002 census, the village had a total of 8 inhabitants. Ethnic groups in the village include:

- Macedonians 8

According to the 1942 Albanian census, Gorna Ǵonovica was inhabited by 227 Serbs.
