= Gostivar =

City in Polog, North Macedonia

Gostivar Гостивар (Macedonian) Gostivari (Albanian)
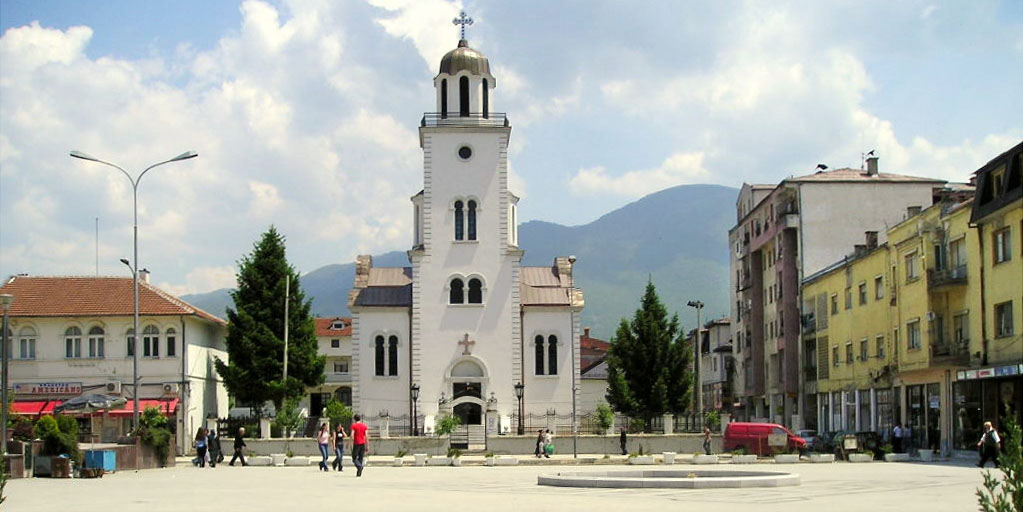
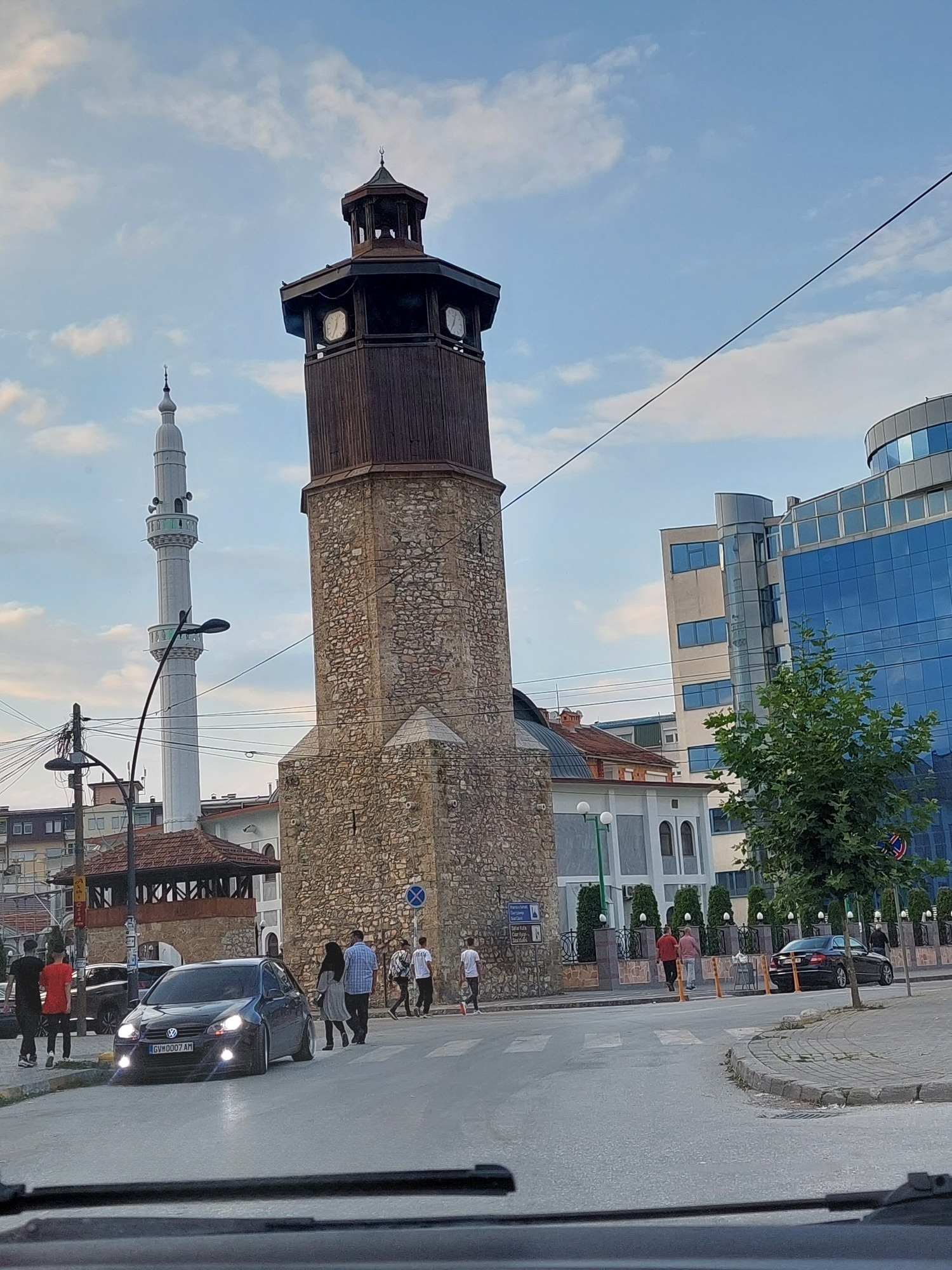
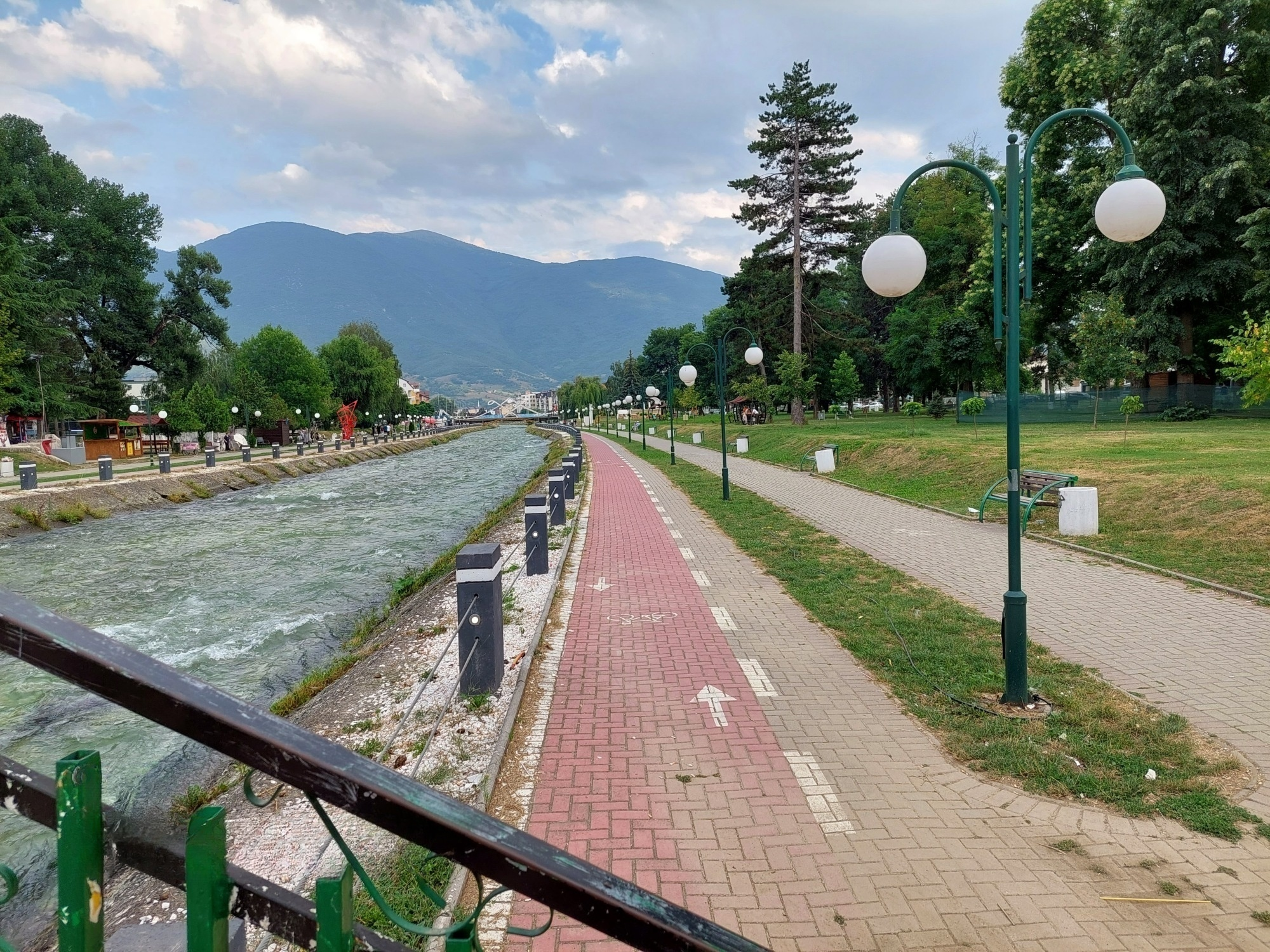
- From the top: Church of the Theotokos on the main square, Clock Tower and Clock Tower Mosque, City Park next to the Vardar River

- Flag Seal

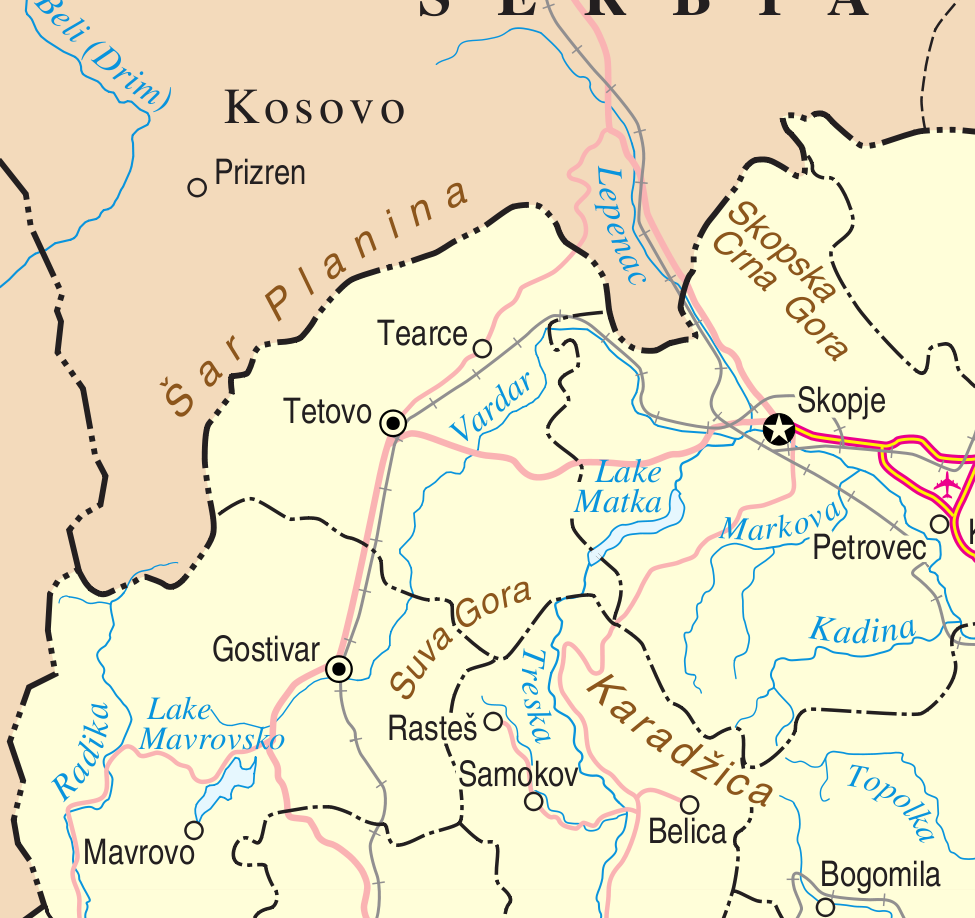
- Location in Northwestern North Macedonia

- Location within North Macedonia
- Coordinates: 41°48′N 20°55′E
- Country: North Macedonia
- Region: Polog
- Municipality: Gostivar

Government
  - Mayor: Valbon Limani (AA)

Area
  - Total: 1.341 km^{2} (0.518 sq mi)

Population (2021)
  - Total: 32,814
- Time zone: UTC+1 (CET)
  - Summer (DST): UTC+2 (CEST)
- Vehicle registration: GV
- Climate: Cfb
- Website: gostivari.gov.mk

Gostivar (Macedonian: Гостивар [ˈɡɔstivar]; Albanian definite form: Gostivari) is a city in North Macedonia, located in the upper Polog valley region. It is the seat of one of the larger municipalities in the country with a population of 59,770, and the town also covers 1.341 square kilometres (331 acres). Gostivar has road and railway connections with the other cities in the region, such as Tetovo, Skopje, Kičevo, Ohrid, and Debar. A freeway was built in 1995, from Gostivar to Tetovo, 24 km (15 mi) long. Gostivar is the seat of Gostivar Municipality.

== Etymology ==
The name Gostivar comes from Slavic words gosti meaning "guests" and dvor meaning castle or fort.

== Geography ==
Gostivar, at an elevation of 535 meters, is situated on the foothills of one of the Šar Mountains. Near to Gostivar is the village of Vrutok, where the Vardar river begins at an altitude of 683 meters (2,241 ft) from the base of the Šar Mountains. Vardar River extends through Gostivar, cutting it in half, passes through the capital Skopje, goes through the country, enters Greece and finally reaches the Aegean Sea.

== Demographics ==
Gostivar is attested in the 1467/68 Ottoman tax registry (defter) for the Nahiyah of Kalkandelen. The village had a total of 44 Christian households, 3 bachelors and 7 widows.

In statistics gathered by Bulgarian researcher Vasil Kanchov in 1900, the city of Gostivar was inhabited by 3,735 people, of whom 3,100 were Turks, 310 Bulgarian Christians, 200 Romani, 150 Muslim Albanians and 25 Vlachs. Kanchov wrote in 1900 that many Albanians declared themselves as Turks. In Gostivar, the population that declared itself Turkish "was of Albanian blood", but it "had been Turkified after the Ottoman invasion, including Skanderbeg", referring to Islamization.

The researcher Dimitar Gađanov wrote in 1916 that Gostivar was populated by 4,000 Albanians "who were Turkified", 100 Orthodox Albanians and 3,500 Bulgarians, while the surrounding area was predominantly Albanian.

According to the 2002 census, the city of Gostivar had a population of 35,847 inhabitants and the ethnic composition is the following:

- Albanians, 16,890 (47.1%)
- Macedonians, 11,885 (33.2%)
- Turks, 4,559 (12.7%)
- Roma, 1,899 (5.3%)
- others, 614 (1.7%)

The most common mother tongues in the city were the following:

- Albanian, 16,877 (47.1%)
- Macedonian, 13,843 (38.6%)
- Turkish, 4,423 (12.3%)
- Romani, 301 (0.8%)
- Serbian, 124 (0.3%)
- others, 279 (0.7%)

The religious composition of the city was the following:

- Muslims, 23,686 (66.1%)
- Orthodox Christians, 11,865 (33.1%)
- others, 296 (0.8%)

City of Gostivar population according to ethnic group 1948-2002
Ethnic group	census 1948		census 1953		census 1961		census 1971		census 1981		census 1994		census 2002		census 2021	
Ethnic group	Number	%	Number	%	Number	%	Number	%	Number	%	Number	%	Number	%	Number	%
Albanians	..	..	4,313	45.4	2,904	22.7	6,044	31.1	10,791	38.9	14,128	42.3	16,890	47.1	13,585	41.4
Macedonians	..	..	2,637	27.7	5,092	39.8	8,109	41.7	10,127	36.5	12,084	36.7	11,885	33.2	10,305	31.4
Turks	..	..	1,924	20.2	4,349	34.0	4,449	22.9	4,378	15.8	4,475	13.6	4,559	12.7	4,725	14.4
Romani	..	..	353	3.7	0	0.0	219	1.1	1254	4.5	1,609	4.9	1,899	5.3	1,648	5.0
Vlachs	..	..	11	0.1	0	0.0	0	0.0	6	0.0	11	0.0	15	0.0	14	0.0
Serbs	..	..	133	1.4	249	2.0	254	1.3	233	0.9	233	0.7	146	0.4	65	0.0
Bosniaks	..	..	0	0.0	0	0.0	0	0.0	0	0.0	0	0.0	34	0.1	21	0.0
Others	..	..	138	1.4	193	1.5	392	2.0	947	3.4	388	1.2	419	1.2	455	1.4
Administrative sources															1,996	6.1
Total	7,832		9,509		12,787		19,467		27,726		32,926		35,847		32,814	

== History ==
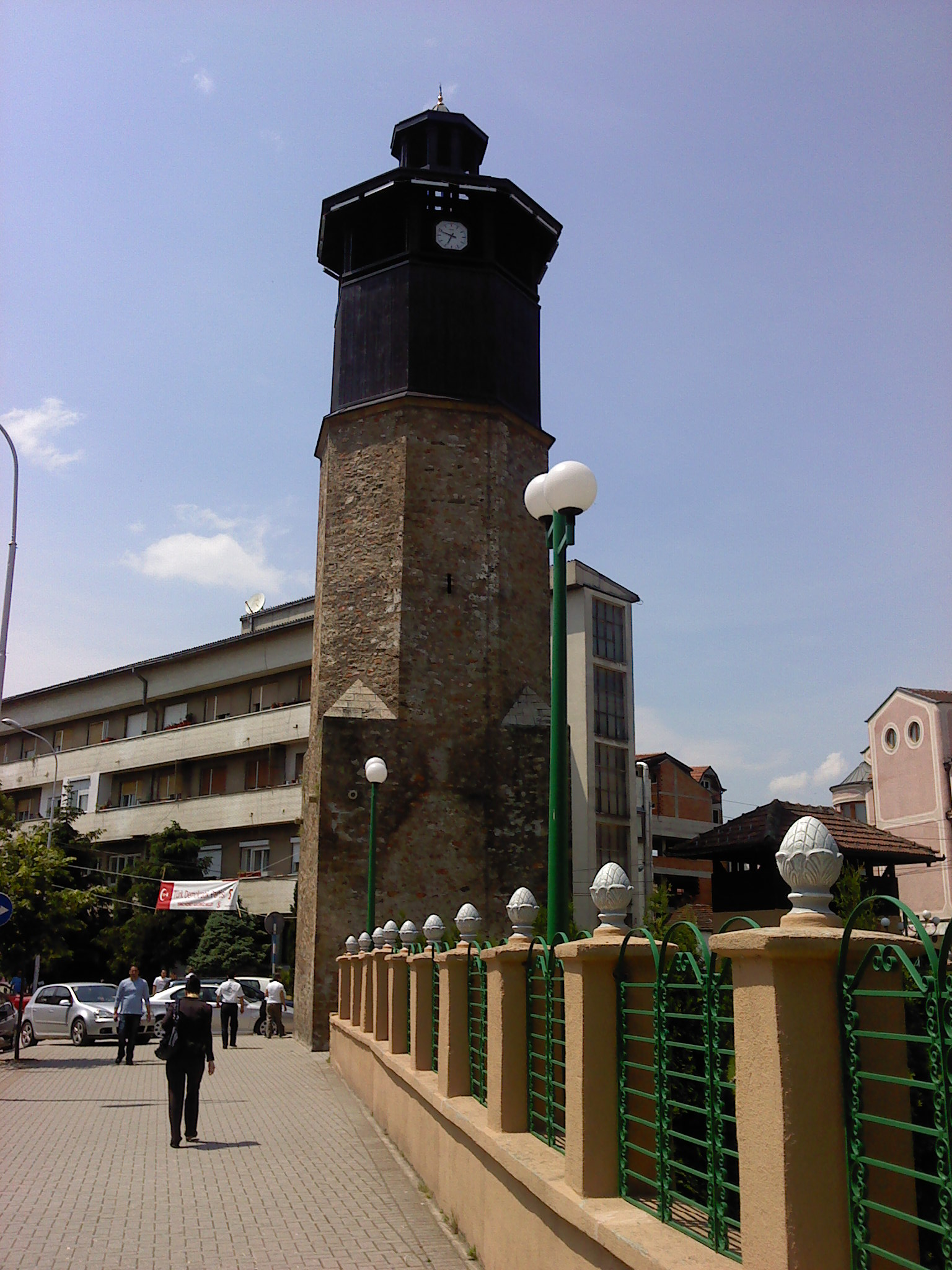
Gostivar's clock tower

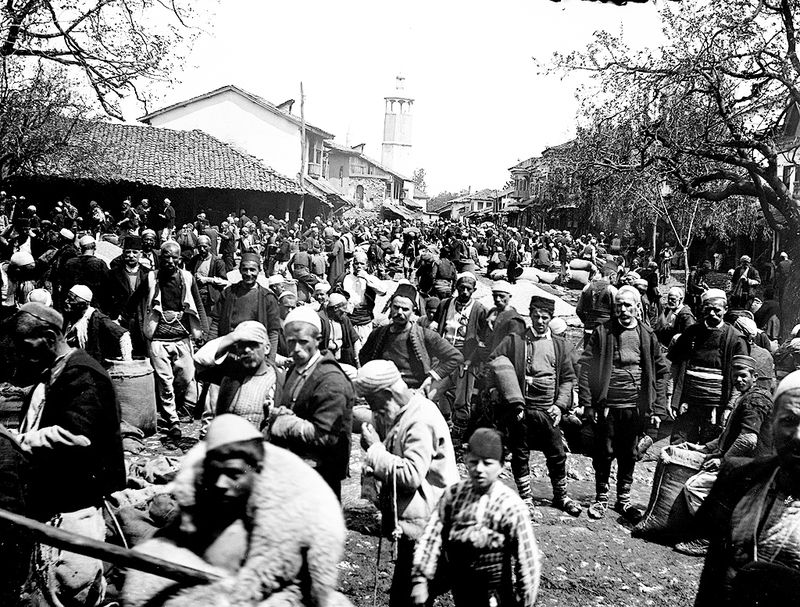
Gostivar Market April 1911, during Ottoman rule

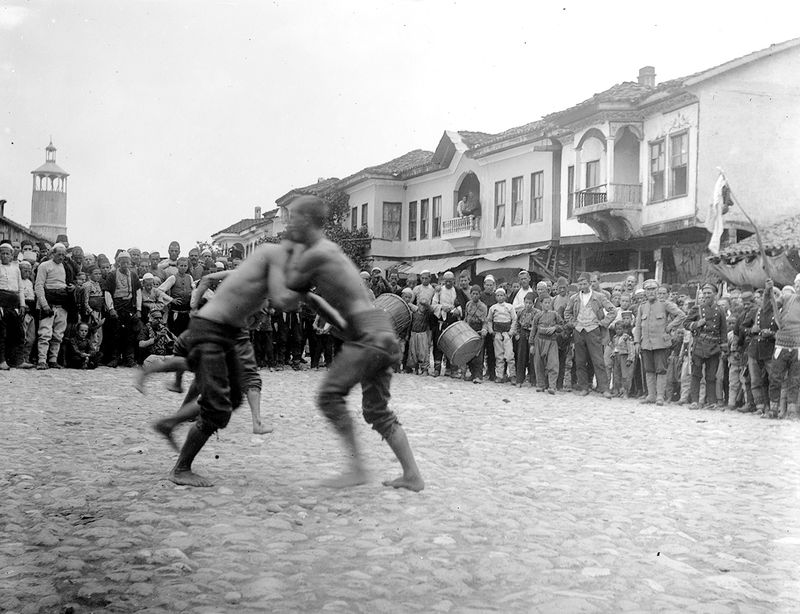
Gostivar 20 July 1916

It is known that there was a town called Draudacum, Draudàkon (Δραυδάκον in Ancient Greek), built in 170 BCE, near or on the current locality of Gostivar.

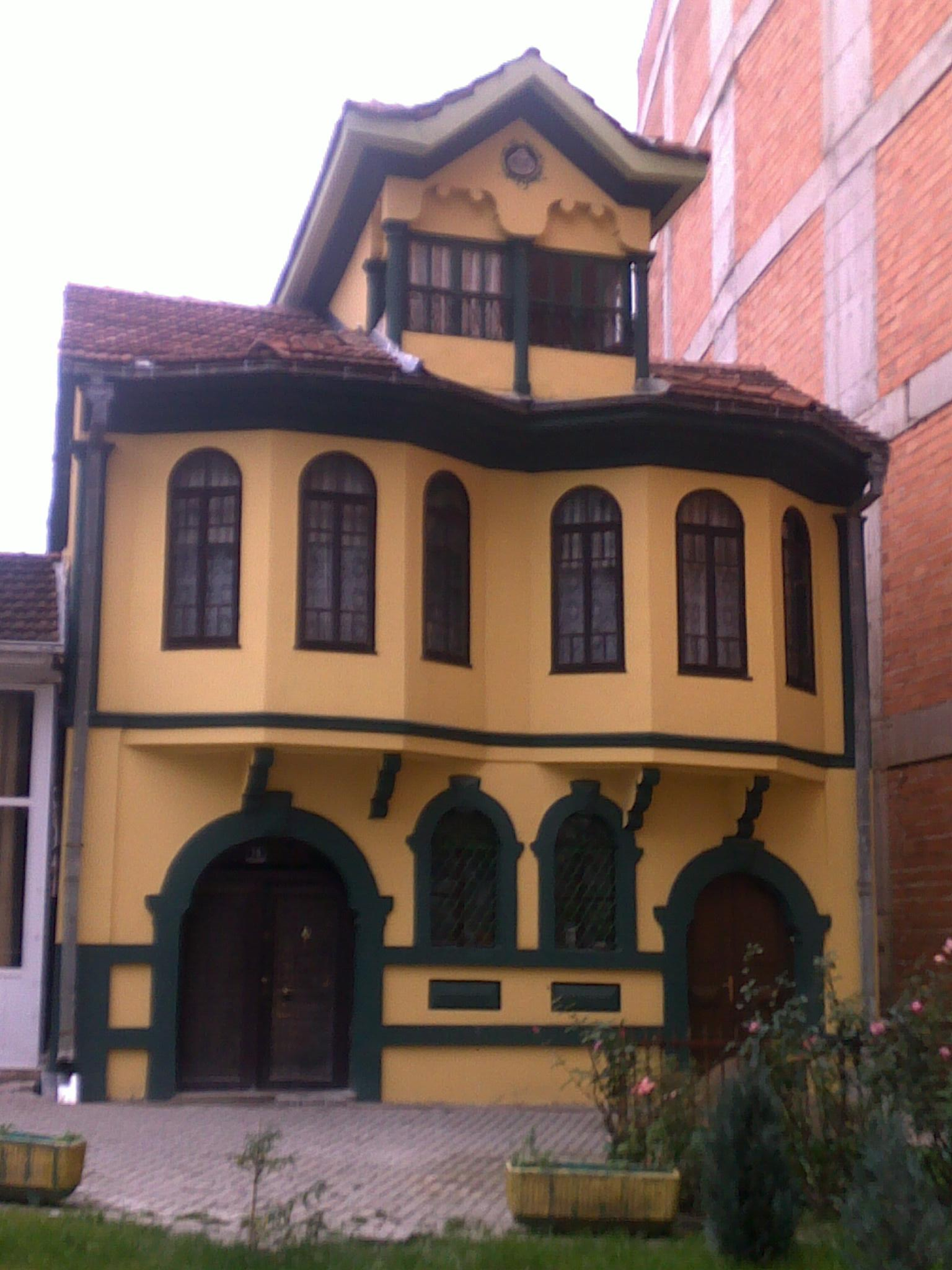
Oldest home in Gostivar

Early mentions of the town was made by the Roman historian Livy. He records how during the Third Macedonian War the King of Macedon Perseus at the head of 10000 men, after taking Uskana (Kicevo), attacked Drau-Dak, today Gostivar.

=== Ottoman Period ===
In the late 14th century, Gostivar came under Ottoman rule along with the rest of Vardar Macedonia.

In the late 19th and early 20th century, Gostivar was part of the Kosovo Vilayet of the Ottoman Empire. During this period it became the centre of a kaza (municipality) and grew into one of the richer towns of Ottoman Vardar Macedonia.

Gostivar remained under Ottoman rule for more than 500 years until 1912, when it was occupied by Serbian troops during the First Balkan War.

=== Yugoslav Period ===
Jordan Ivanov, professor at the University of Sofia, wrote in 1915 that Albanians, since they did not have their own alphabet, due to a lack of consolidated national consciousness and influenced by foreign propaganda, declared themselves as Turks, Greeks and Bulgarians, depending on which religion they belonged to. The Orthodox Albanians of Gostivar were Bulgarianized by due to them being near the Bulgarian population.

From 1929 to 1941, Gostivar was part of the Vardar Banovina of the Kingdom of Yugoslavia, and then became part of Italian-occupied Albania.

From the 1950s onwards Orthodox Christian Albanian speakers from Upper Reka migrated cities like Gostivar, where they form the main population of Durtlok neighbourhood.

A policy of Turkification of the Albanian population was employed by the Yugoslav authorities in cooperation with the Turkish government, stretching the period of 1948-1959. A commission was created to tour Albanian communities in Macedonia, visiting Gostivar amongst other cities. Starting in 1948, six Turkish schools were opened in areas with large Albanian majorities, such as Tearce, Gorna Banjica, Dolna Banjica Vrapčište as well as in the outskirts of Tetovo and Gostivar. Contemporary analysis described cases of resistance to the Turkish schools in the Polog area, with Albanian speaking students and teachers refused to attend Turkish schools. A notable case happened in Gostivar, where a teacher from Banjica, who according to the committees analysis: "even though he was born in the same village and his mother tongue is Turkish, when the Turkish school was opened he refused to teach in Turkish and had asked to work in Albanian villages ...". Thus the Yugoslav committee characterized the local population as having adopted a "Greater Albanian political worldview". Resistance against the opening of Turkish schools was most prevalent in Tetovo and Gostivar. In Gostivar the nationalist activist Myrtezan Bajraktari was detained and interrogated by the Yugoslav secret police (UDBA). During his interrogation he stated he openly opposed the Turkish schools, and that he does so "just so Albanians can feel like patriots and not allow themselves to be Turkified."

== Economy ==
In May 2015, an automotive company announced that it would open a new plant in Gostivar in the summer of 2015.

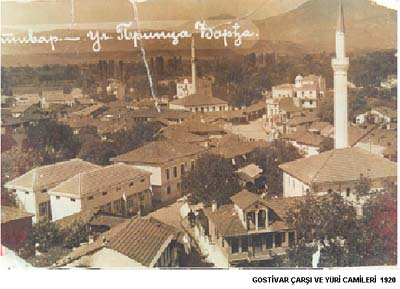
Gostivar Bazaar in 1920

== Tourism ==
Leaving Gostivar on the way to Ohrid, the village Vrutok has the gorge of the biggest river in North Macedonia, Vardar, which is 388 km (241 mi) long and flows into the Aegean Sea, at Thessaloniki. Gostivar is one of the biggest settlements in the Polog valley. The Polog valley can be observed from the high lands of Mavrovo and Galičnik.

The Mavrovo region hosts ski tournaments and other sport recreations. The peaks on the northern part of the Bistra mountain: Rusino Brdo, Sultanica and Sandaktas, host winter sport activities.

The range is 80 km (50 mi) long and 12 km (7 mi) wide and is covered with snow from November till March or April every year. Its highest peak, Titov Vrv, is situated on 2,760 meters (9,055 ft) above sea level. This provides opportunities for animal husbandry. Dairy products, mainly cheese and feta cheese, are made in the many sheepfolds on Šar and the adjacent mountains. These include several kinds of feta cheese, like Shara and Galicnik.

Located in the northwestern part of North Macedonia, Popova Shapka is another winter ski resort. It is situated on the Šar Mountain, 1,780 meters (5,840 ft) above the sea level, just 35 kilometres (22 mi) from the capital Skopje. Popova Shapka has hotel accommodation.

Visitors not from the Republic of North Macedonia, and elsewhere other countries, use the facilities. Popova Shapka has been a host to both the European and Balkan Ski Championships. Not far from the resort, there are a number of small glacial lakes around on the mountain. There are two ways to get to Popova Shapka: by car, and by rope-railway with a starting location in Tetovo. The rope-railway is 6 km (4 mi) long and it takes about 36 minutes to reach the top.

== Sports ==
Football club KF Gostivari has played in the Macedonian First League and stage their home games at the City Stadium Gostivar.

== Gallery ==
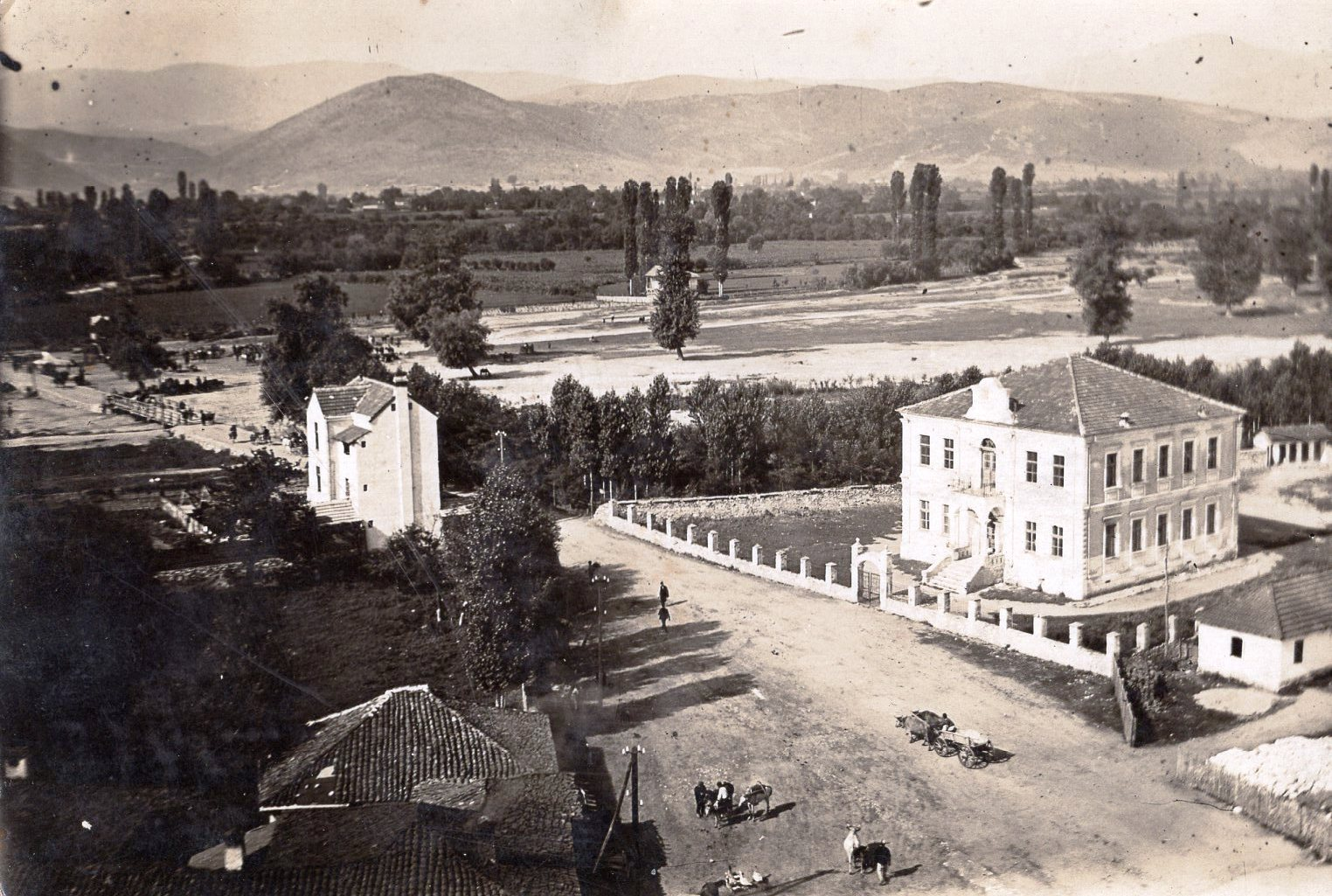
Gostivar at 1921

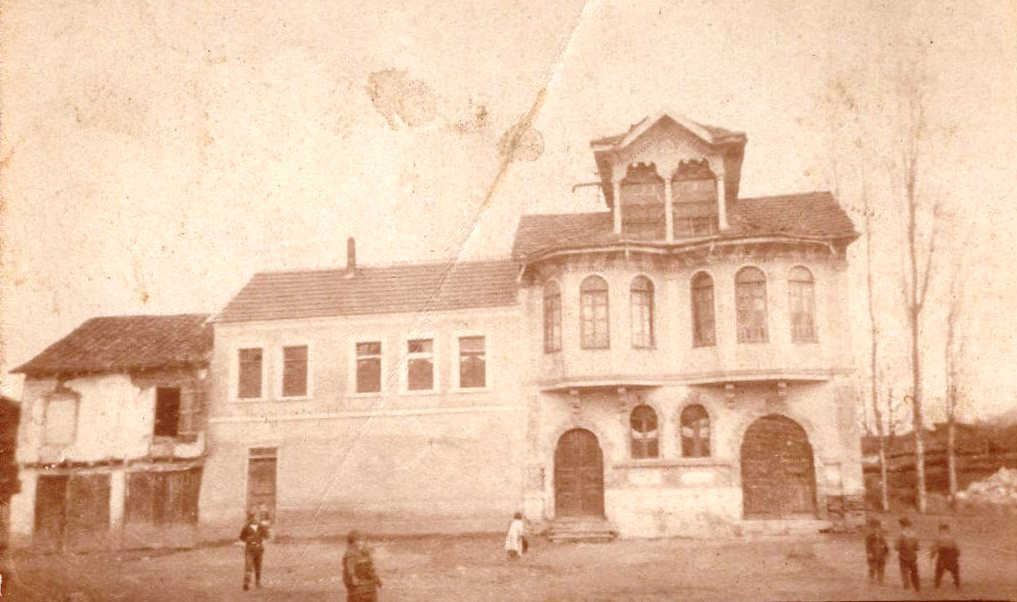
Gostivar at 1929

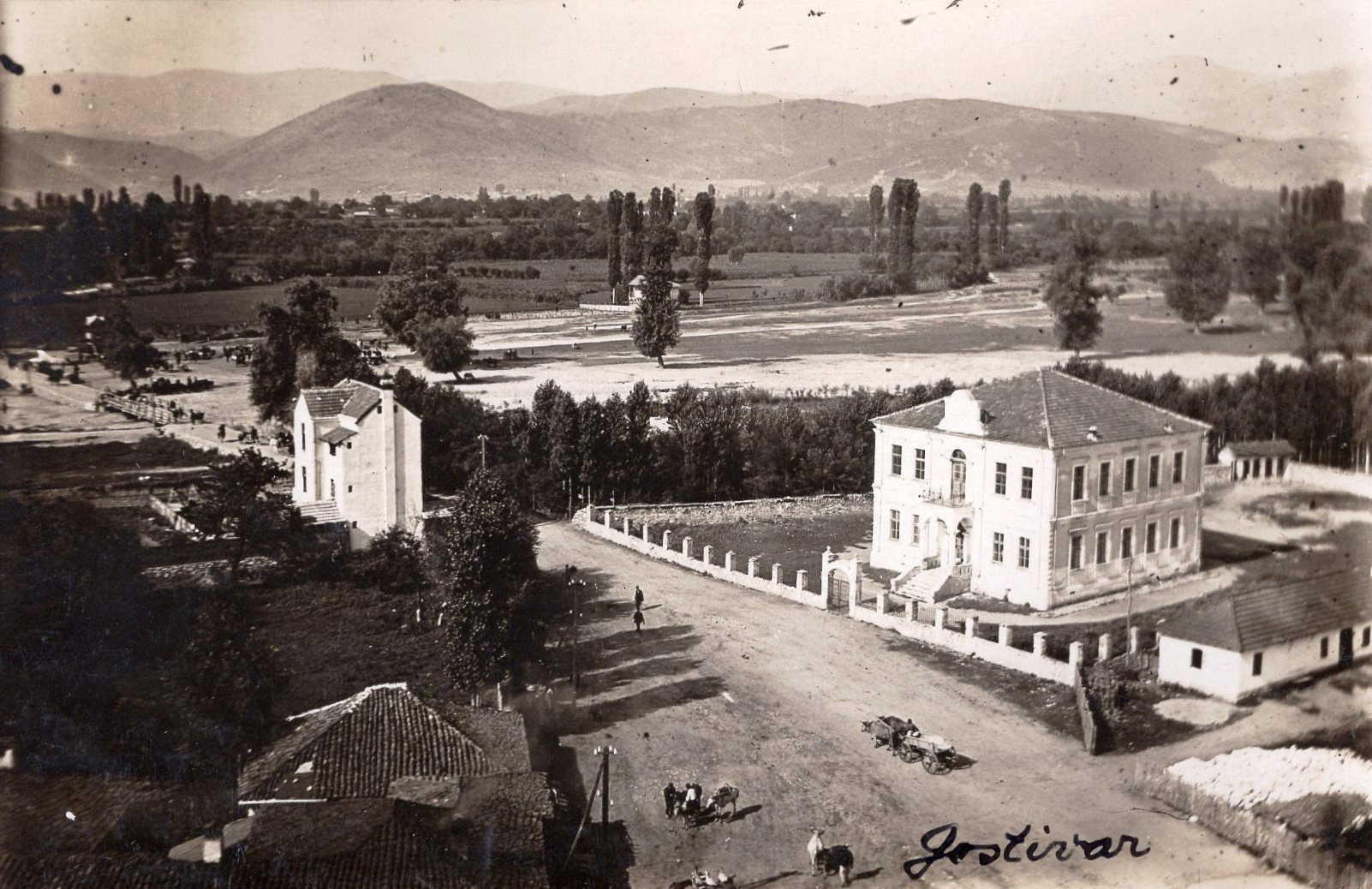
Gostivar at 1930

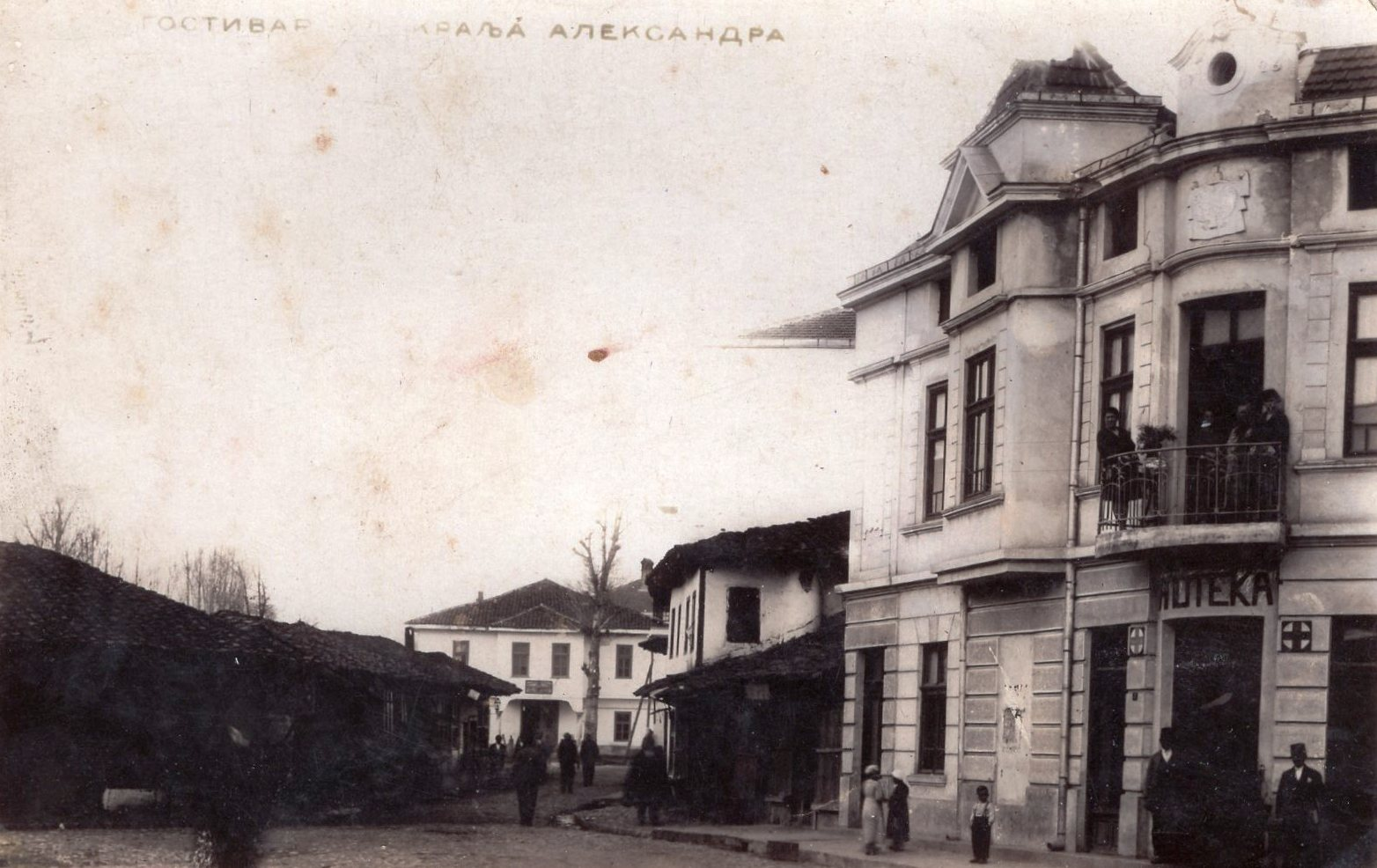
Gostivar at 1930

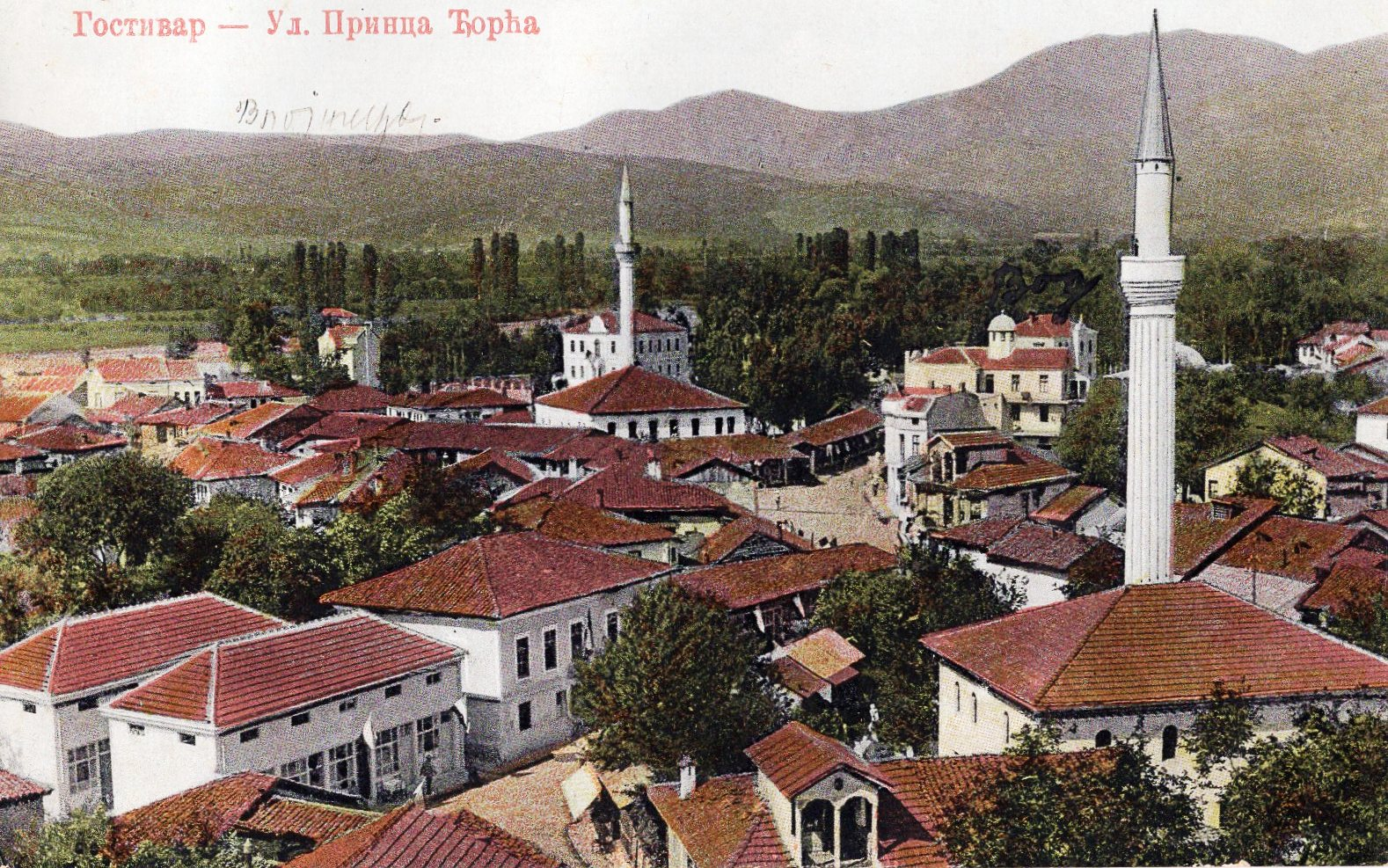
Gostivar at 1935
