= Strajane =

Strajane Страјане Strajan
- Village
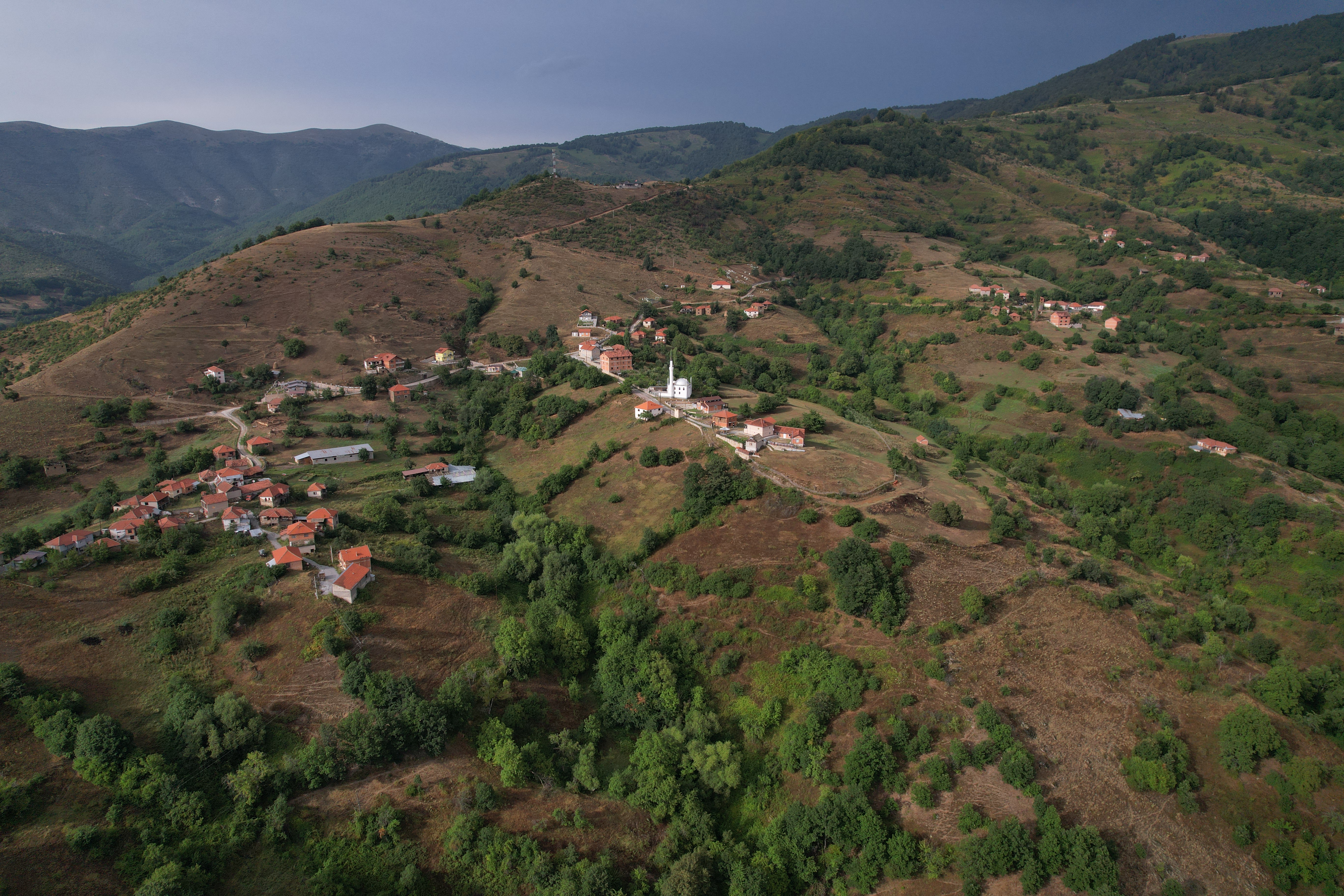
- Airview of the village

- Location within North Macedonia
- Coordinates: 41°43′26″N 21°03′29″E
- Country: North Macedonia
- Region: Polog
- Municipality: Gostivar

Population (2021)
  - Total: 54
- Time zone: UTC+1 (CET)
  - Summer (DST): UTC+2 (CEST)
- Car plates: GV
- Website: .

Strajane (Macedonian: Страјане, Albanian: Strajan) is a village in the municipality of Gostivar, North Macedonia.

== Demographics ==
As of the 2021 census, Strajane had 54 residents with the following ethnic composition:

- Albanians 46
- Persons for whom data are taken from administrative sources 8

According to the 2002 census, the village had a total of 307 inhabitants. Ethnic groups in the village include:

- Albanians 307

According to the 1942 Albanian census, Strajane was inhabited by 489 Muslim Albanians.
