= Tenovo =

Tenovo Теново Tenovë
- Village
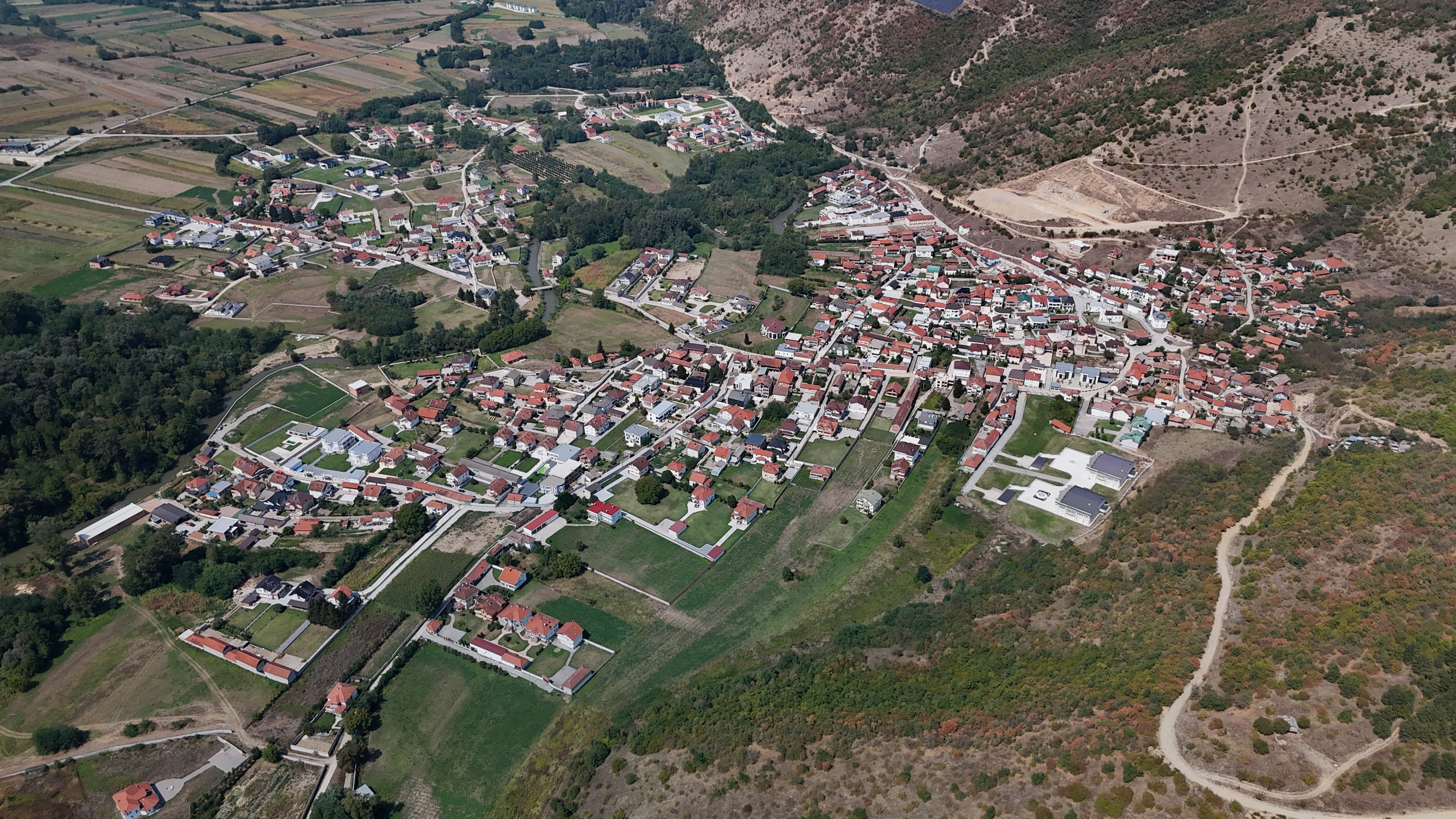
- Air view of the village

- Location within North Macedonia
- Coordinates: 41°54′N 20°59′E
- Country: North Macedonia
- Region: Polog
- Municipality: Brvenica

Population (2021)
  - Total: 1,175
- Time zone: UTC+1 (CET)
  - Summer (DST): UTC+2 (CEST)
- Car plates: TE
- Website: .

Tenovo (Macedonian: Теново, Albanian: Tenovë) is a village in the municipality of Brvenica, North Macedonia.

== History ==
Tenovo is attested in the 1467/68 Ottoman tax registry (defter) for the Nahiyah of Kalkandelen. The village had a total of 146 Christian households, 9 bachelors and 12 widows, as well as 5 Muslim households. According to the 1467-68 Ottoman defter, Tenovo appears exhibits Slavic Orthodox anthroponomy.

== Demographics ==
As of the 2021 census, Tenovo had 1,175 residents with the following ethnic composition:

- Albanians 963
- Macedonians 189
- Persons for whom data are taken from administrative sources 23

According to the 2002 census, the village had a total of 1,602 inhabitants. Ethnic groups in the village include:

- Albanians – 1,391
- Macedonians – 210
- Others – 1

According to the 1942 Albanian census, Tenovo was inhabited by 487 Muslim Albanians, 264 Serbs and 8 Bulgarians.

In statistics gathered by Vasil Kanchov in 1900, the village of Tenovo (Teynovo) was inhabited by 170 Christian Bulgarians and 150 Muslim Albanians.
