= Balin Dol =

Balin Dol Балин Дол Balindoll
- Village
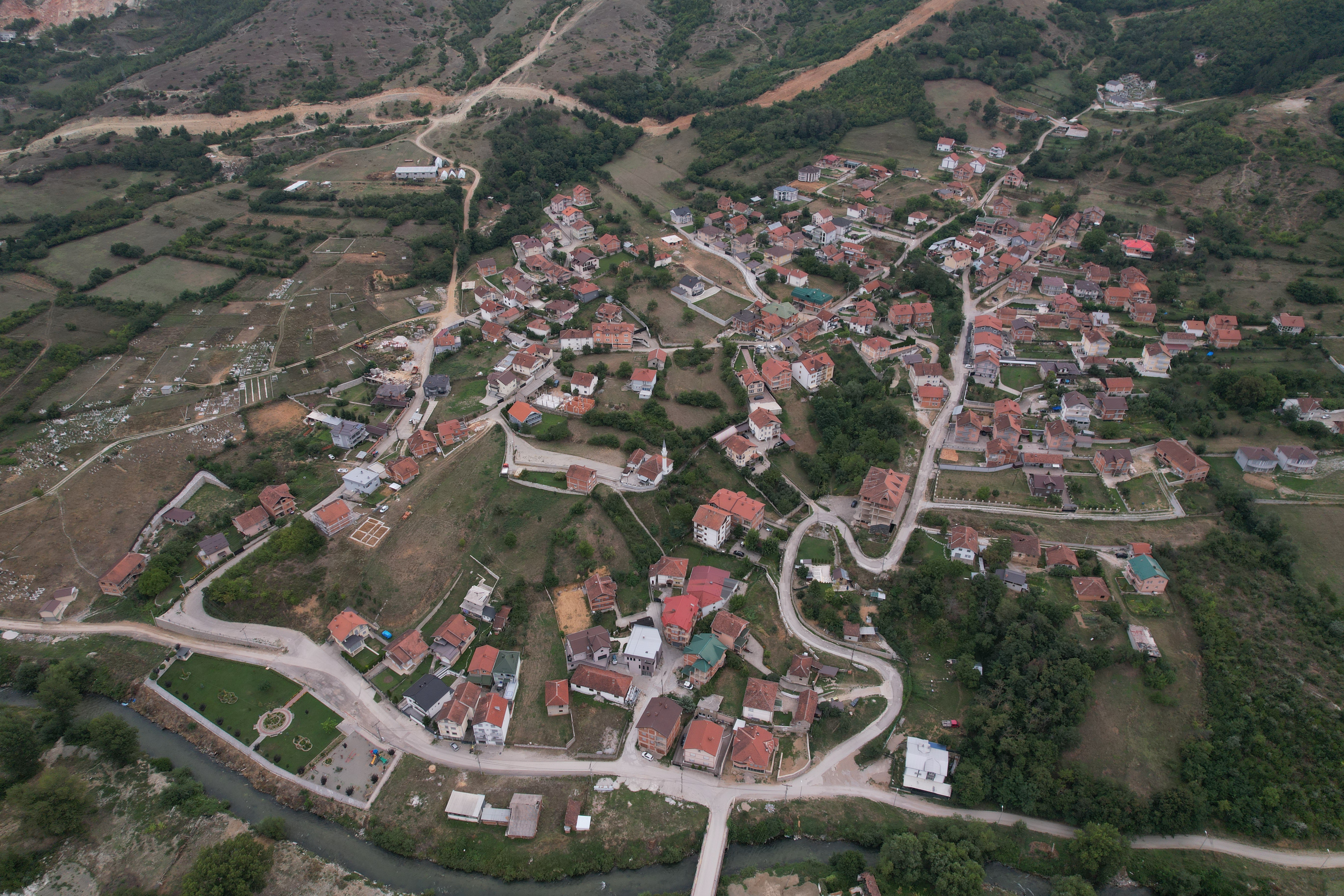
- Airview of the village Balin Dol

- Location within North Macedonia
- Coordinates: 41°48′N 20°56′E
- Country: North Macedonia
- Region: Polog
- Municipality: Gostivar

Population (2021)
  - Total: 2,059
- Time zone: UTC+1 (CET)
  - Summer (DST): UTC+2 (CEST)
- Car plates: GV
- Website: .

Balin Dol (Macedonian: Балин Дол, Albanian: Balindoll) is a village in the municipality of Gostivar, North Macedonia.

== Demographics ==
Balin Dol is attested in the 1467/68 Ottoman tax registry (defter) for the Nahiyah of Kalkandelen. The village had a total of 26 Christian households and 2 bachelors.

As of the 2021 census, Balin Dol had 2,059 residents with the following ethnic composition:

- Albanians 1,651
- Macedonians 319
- Persons for whom data are taken from administrative sources 72
- Turks 13
- Others 4

According to the 2002 census, the village had a total of 2501 inhabitants. Ethnic groups in the village include:

- Albanians 2156
- Macedonians 337
- Serbs 3
- Bosniaks 1
- Others 4

According to the 1942 Albanian census, Balin Dol was inhabited by 641 Muslim Albanians and 237 Serbs.
