= Radiovce =

Radiovce Радиовце Radovec
- Village
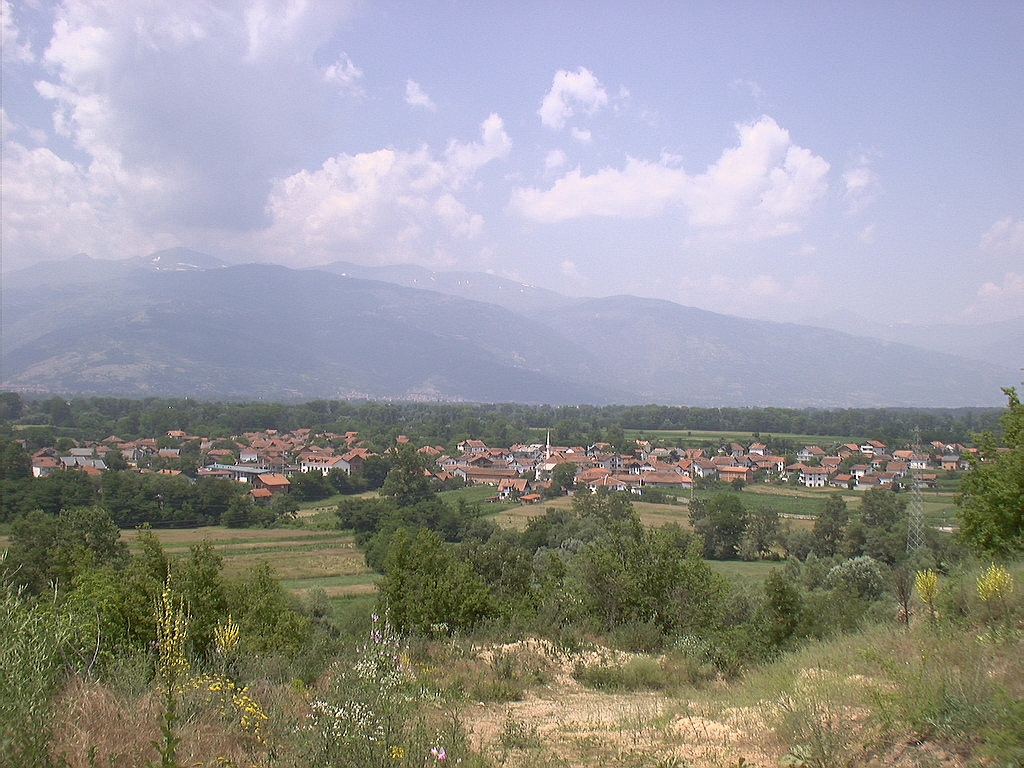

- Location within North Macedonia
- Coordinates: 42°00′N 20°58′E
- Country: North Macedonia
- Region: Polog
- Municipality: Brvenica

Population (2021)
  - Rakari: 885
- Time zone: UTC+1 (CET)
  - Summer (DST): UTC+2 (CEST)
- Postal code: 1200
- Area code: +389 044
- Car plates: TE

Radiovce (Macedonian: Радиовце, Macedonian pronunciation: [raˈdiɔftsɛ]; Albanian: Radovec) is a village in Brvenica Municipality near the town of Tetovo in North Macedonia.

== Population and demographics ==
Radiovce is attested in the 1467/68 Ottoman tax registry (defter) for the Nahiyah of Kalkandelen. The village had a total of 20 Christian households and 3 widows.

As of the 2021 census, Radiovce had 885 residents with the following ethnic composition:

- Albanians 541
- Macedonians 330
- Persons for whom data are taken from administrative sources 14

According to the 2002 census, the village had a total of 1049 inhabitants. Ethnic groups in the village include:

- Albanians 691
- Macedonians 346
- Serbs 3
- Others 9

According to the 1942 Albanian census, Radiovce was inhabited by 317 Serbs, 5 Bulgarians and 148 Muslim Albanians.

In statistics gathered by Vasil Kanchov in 1900, the village of Radiovce (Radiovci) was inhabited by 150 Christian Bulgarians.
