= Gurgurnica =

Gurgurnica Гургурница (Macedonian) Gurguricë (Albanian)
- Village
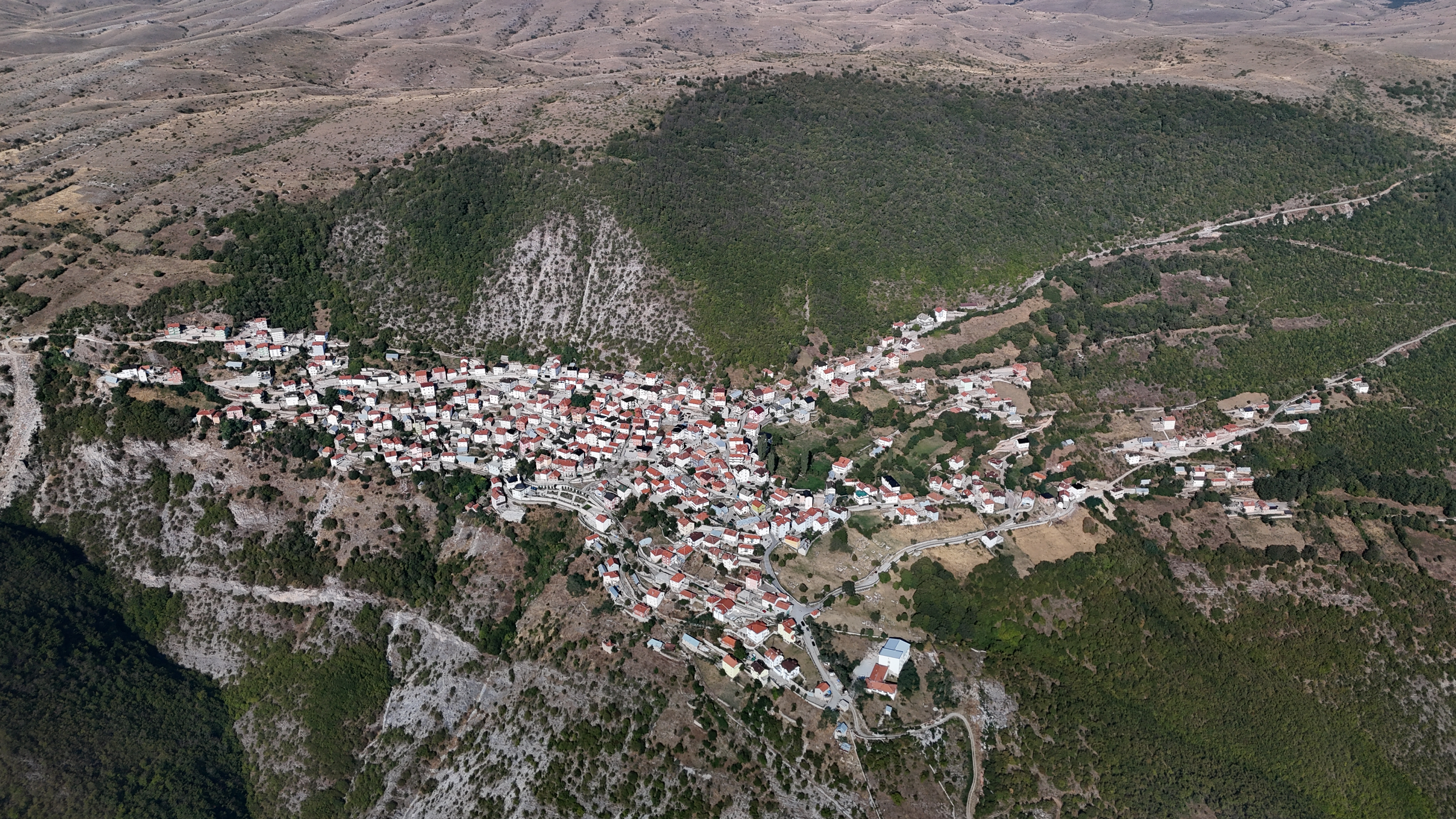
- Air view of the village

- Location within North Macedonia
- Coordinates: 41°51′N 21°06′E
- Country: North Macedonia
- Region: Polog
- Municipality: Brvenica

Population (2021)
  - Total: 954
- Time zone: UTC+1 (CET)
  - Summer (DST): UTC+2 (CEST)
- Car plates: TE
- Website: .

Gurgurnica (Macedonian: Гургурница, Albanian: Gurguricë) is a village in the municipality of Brvenica, North Macedonia.

== Demographics ==
As of the 2021 census, Gurgurnica had 954 residents with the following ethnic composition:

- Albanians 863
- Persons for whom data are taken from administrative sources 90
- Macedonians 1

According to the 2002 census, the village had a total of 1556 inhabitants. Ethnic groups in the village include:

- Albanians 1549
- Macedonians 1
- Others 6

According to the 1942 Albanian census, Gurgurnica was inhabited by 723 Muslim Albanians.

In statistics gathered by Vasil Kanchov in 1900, the village of Gurgurnica was inhabited by 276 Мuslim Albanians.
