= Gorna Banjica =

Gorna Banjica Горна Бањица Banjicë e Epërme Yukarı Banisa
- Village
- Location within North Macedonia
- Coordinates: 41°47′N 20°54′E
- Country: North Macedonia
- Region: Polog
- Municipality: Gostivar

Population (2002)
  - Total: 4,423
- Time zone: UTC+1 (CET)
  - Summer (DST): UTC+2 (CEST)
- Car plates: GV
- Website: .

Gorna Banjica (Macedonian: Горна Бањица, Turkish: Yukarı Banisa, Albanian: Banjicë e Epërme) is a village in the municipality of Gostivar, North Macedonia.

== History ==
Gorna Banjica is attested in the 1467/68 Ottoman tax registry (defter) for the Nahiyah of Kalkandelen. The village had a total of 37 Christian households, 7 widows and 2 bachelors.

A policy of Turkification of the Albanian population was employed by the Yugoslav authorities in cooperation with the Turkish government, stretching the period of 1948-1959. Starting in 1948, Turkish schools were opened in areas with large Albanian majorities, such as Gorna Banjica.

== Demographics ==
According to the 1942 Albanian census, Gorna Banjica was inhabited by 854 Muslim Albanians, 35 Serbs and 11 Bulgarians.

The Yugoslav census of 1953 recorded 1,072 people of whom 754 were Albanians, 240 Turks, 73 Macedonians and 5 others. The 1961 Yugoslav census recorded 1,108 people of whom 212 were Albanians, 827 Turks, 68 Macedonians and 1 others. The 1971 census recorded 1,267 people of whom 239 were Albanians, 1,003 Turks and 25 Macedonians. The 1981 Yugoslav census recorded 1,611 people of whom 474 were Albanians, 7 Macedonians, 1,118 Turks, 1 Bosniak and 11 others. The Macedonian census of 1994 recorded 1,622 people of whom 422 were Albanians, 1,239 Turks and 1 other.

According to the 2002 census, the village had a total of 4,423 inhabitants. Ethnic groups in the village include:

- Albanians 1,636
- Turks 1,243
- Macedonians 1,196
- Romani 315
- Serbs 4
- Others 29

As of the 2021 census, Gorna Banjica had 3,436 residents with the following ethnic composition:

- Turks 1,503
- Macedonians 839
- Albanians 811
- Roma 610
- Persons for whom data are taken from administrative sources 107
- Others 16
