= Korito =

Korito Корито Koritë
- Village
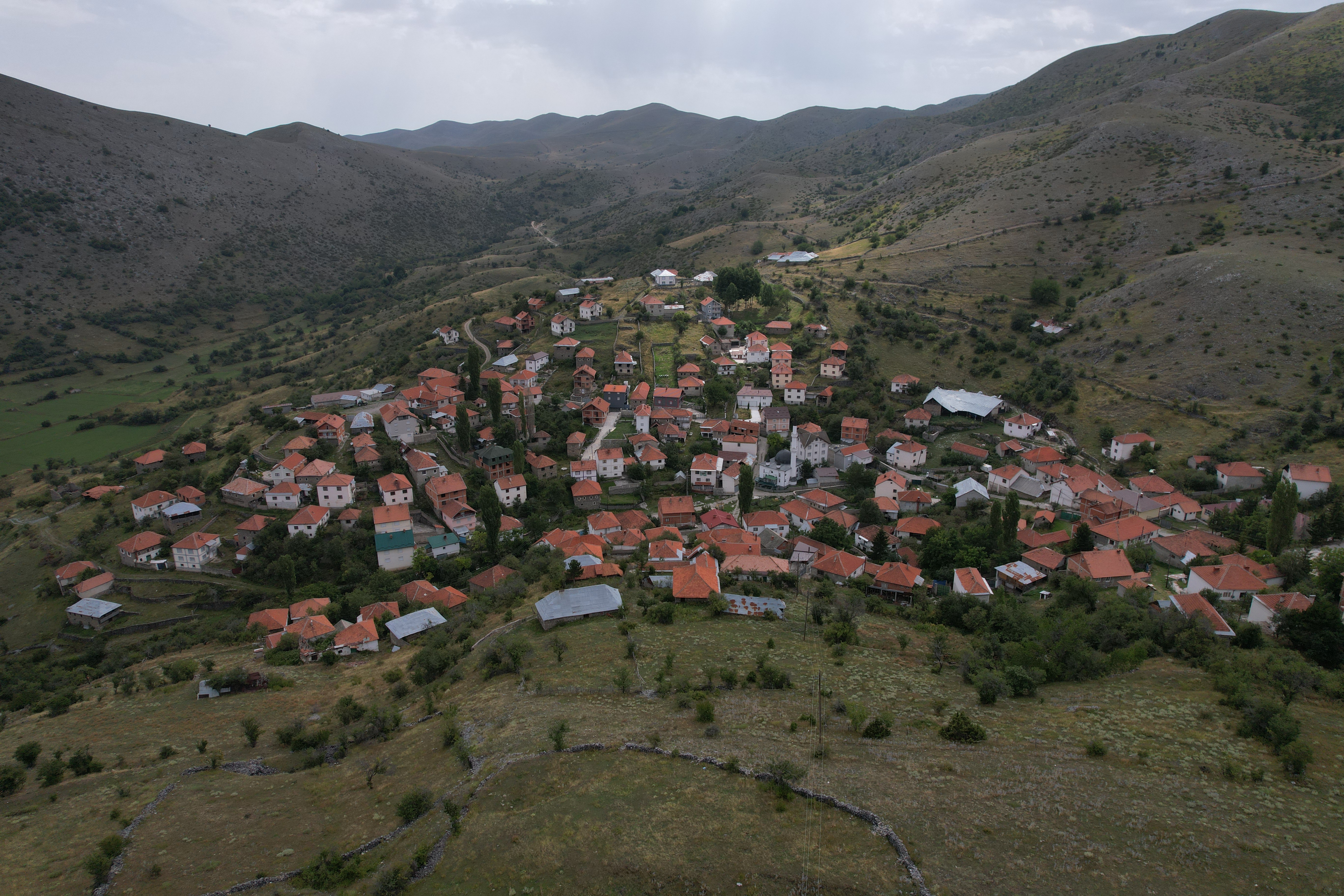
- Airview of the village Korito

- Location within North Macedonia
- Coordinates: 41°48′N 21°02′E
- Country: North Macedonia
- Region: Polog
- Municipality: Gostivar

Population (2021)
  - Total: 57
- Time zone: UTC+1 (CET)
  - Summer (DST): UTC+2 (CEST)
- Car plates: GV
- Website: .

Korito (Macedonian: Корито, Albanian: Koritë) is a village in the municipality of Gostivar, North Macedonia.

== Demographics ==
Korito is attested in the 1467/68 Ottoman tax registry (defter) for the Nahiyah of Kalkandelen. The village had a total of 37 Christian households аnd 2 bachelors.

As of the 2021 census, Korito had 57 residents with the following ethnic composition:

- Albanians 54
- Persons for whom data are taken from administrative sources 3

According to the 2002 census, the village had a total of 675 inhabitants. Ethnic groups in the village include:

- Albanians 673
- Others 2

According to the 1942 Albanian census, Korito was inhabited by 603 Muslim Albanians.
