= Malo Turčane =

Malo Turčane Мало Турчане Turçan i Vogël
- Village
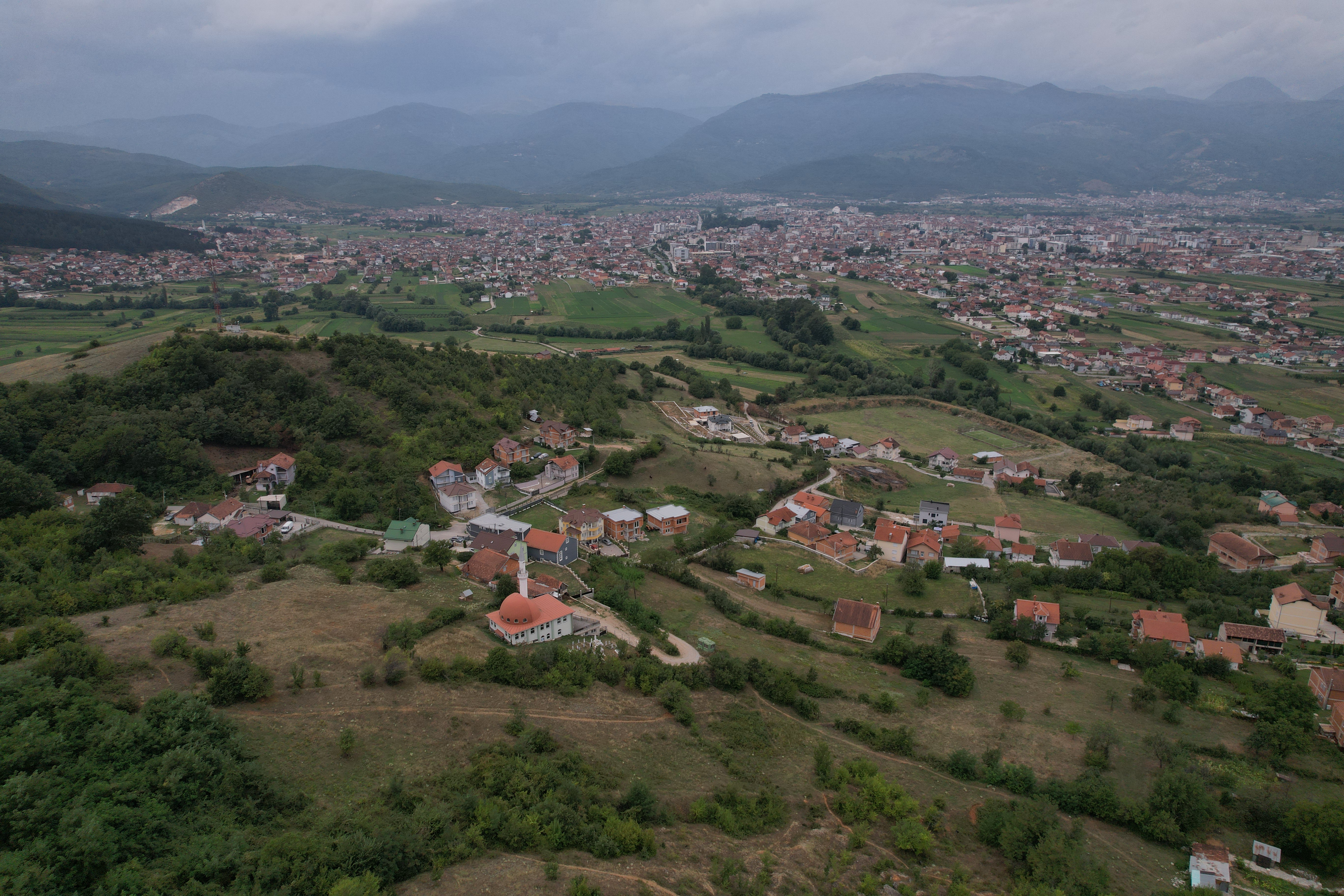
- Airview of the village

- Location within North Macedonia
- Coordinates: 41°47′N 20°56′E
- Country: North Macedonia
- Region: Polog
- Municipality: Gostivar

Population (2021)
  - Total: 96
- Time zone: UTC+1 (CET)
  - Summer (DST): UTC+2 (CEST)
- Car plates: GV
- Website: .

Malo Turčane (Macedonian: Мало Турчане, Albanian: Turçan i Vogël) is a village in the municipality of Gostivar, North Macedonia.

== History ==
Malo Turčane is attested in the 1467/68 Ottoman tax registry (defter) for the Nahiyah of Kalkandelen. The village had a total of 34 Christian households, 1 widow and 2 bachelors.

== Demographics ==
As of the 2021 census, Vrutok had 96 residents with the following ethnic composition:

- Albanians 85
- Persons for whom data are taken from administrative sources 11

According to the 2002 census, the village had a total of 1,013 inhabitants. Ethnic groups in the village include:

- Albanians 1,005
- Macedonians 1
- Others 7

According to the 1942 Albanian census, Malo Turčane was inhabited by 245 Muslim Albanians.
