= Zdunje =

Zdunje Здуње Zdunjë Zdunye
- Village
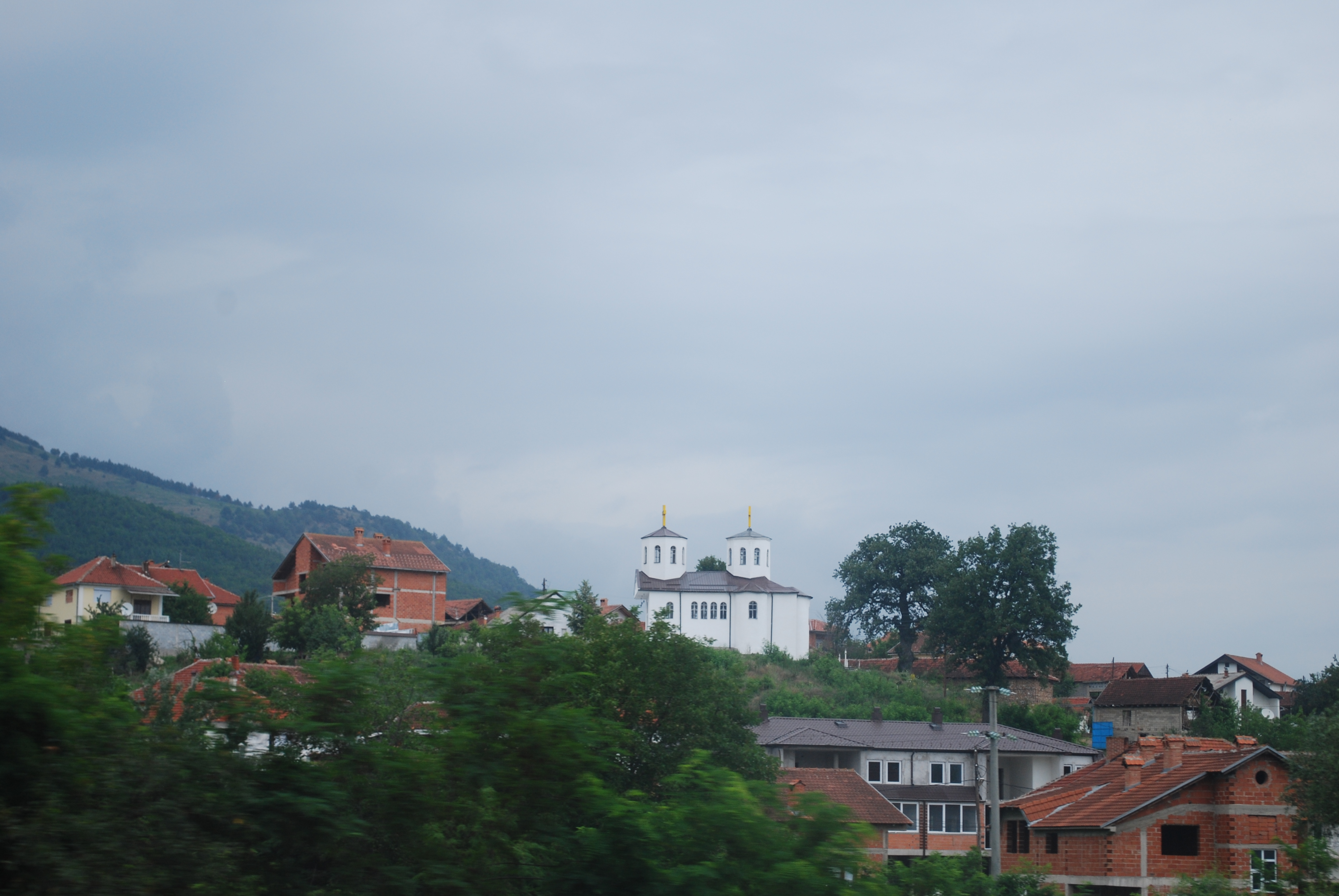

- Location within North Macedonia
- Coordinates: 41°47′39″N 20°52′32″E
- Country: North Macedonia
- Region: Polog
- Municipality: Gostivar

Population (2021)
  - Total: 1,410
- Time zone: UTC+1 (CET)
  - Summer (DST): UTC+2 (CEST)
- Car plates: GV
- Website: .

Zdunje (Macedonian: Здуње, Albanian: Zdunjë, Turkish: Zdunye) is a village in the municipality of Gostivar, North Macedonia.

== History ==
Zdunje is attested in the 1467/68 Ottoman tax registry (defter) for the Nahiyah of Kalkandelen. The village had a total of 20 Christian households, 1 widow and 1 bachelor.

According to the 1467-68 Ottoman defter, Zdunje appears as having largely Christian Albanian anthroponomy. Due to Slavicisation, some families had a mixed Slav-Albanian anthroponomy - usually a Slavic first name and an Albanian last name or last names with Albanian patronyms and Slavic suffixes.

In statistics gathered by Vasil Kanchov in 1900, the village was inhabited by 300 Turks, 120 Muslim Albanians, and 65 Bulgarian Exarchists. According to geographer Dimitri Mishev (D. M. Brancoff), in 1905, the town 64 Bulgarian Exarchists.

== Demographics ==
As of the 2021 census, Zdunje had 1,140 residents with the following ethnic composition:

- Albanians 730
- Turks 532
- Macedonians 77
- Persons from whom data are taken from administrative sources 70
- Others 1

According to the 2002 census, the village is multiethnical with a total of 2140 inhabitants. Ethnic groups in the village include:

- Albanians 998
- Turks 659
- Macedonians 467
- Romani 9
- Serbs 1
- Others 9
