= Rakovec, Bogovinje =

Rakovec
- Village
- Раковец
- Location within Republic of Macedonia
- Coordinates: 41°55′14″N 20°53′57″E
- Country: North Macedonia
- Region: Polog
- Municipality: Bogovinje

Population (2021)
  - Total: 577
- Time zone: UTC+1 (CET)
  - Summer (DST): UTC+2 (CEST)
- Car plates: TE
- Website: .

Rakovec (Macedonian: Раковец, Albanian: Rakovec) is a village in the municipality of Bogovinje, North Macedonia.

== History ==
Dobri Dol is attested in the 1467/68 Ottoman tax registry (defter) for the Nahiyah of Kalkandelen. The village had a total of 15 Christian households and 1 bachelor.

According to the 1467-68 Ottoman defter, Rakovec exhibits names almost entirely belonging to the Orthodox Christian Albanian onomastic sphere. Due to Slavicisation, some families had a mixed Slav-Albanian anthroponomy - usually a Slavic first name and an Albanian last name or last names with Albanian patronyms and Slavic suffixes.

According to the 1942 Albanian census, Rakovec was inhabited by 584 Muslim Albanians.

== Demographics ==
As of the 2021 census, Rakovec had 577 residents with the following ethnic composition:

- Albanians 548
- Persons for whom data are taken from administrative sources 29

According to the 2002 census, the village had a total of 811 inhabitants. Ethnic groups in the village include:

- Albanians 807
- Others 4
