= Gorno Sedlarce =

Gorno Sedlarce Горно Седларце Sellarcë e Epërme
- Village
- Location within Republic of Macedonia
- Coordinates: 41°56′N 20°57′E
- Country: North Macedonia
- Region: Polog
- Municipality: Bogovinje

Population (2021)
  - Total: 1,521
- Time zone: UTC+1 (CET)
  - Summer (DST): UTC+2 (CEST)
- Car plates: TE
- Website: .

Gorno Sedlarce (Macedonian: Горно Седларце, Albanian: Sellarcë e Epërme) is a village in the municipality of Bogovinje, North Macedonia.

== Demographics ==
Gorno Sedlarce is attested in the 1467/68 Ottoman tax registry (defter) for the Nahiyah of Kalkandelen. The village had a total of 37 Christian households, 2 bachelors and 4 widows.

Gorno Sedlarce appears in 15th century Ottoman defters as a village in the nahiyah of Kalkandelen. Among its inhabitants, a certain Nikolla son of Arbanas is recorded as a household head.The name Arbanas, is a medieval rendering for Albanian, indicating an Albanian presence in the village.

In statistics gathered by Vasil Kanchov in 1900, the village of Gorno Sedlarce was inhabited by 85 Muslim Albanians.

According to the 1942 Albanian census, Gorno Sedlarce was inhabited by 539 Muslim Albanians.

As of the 2021 census, Gorno Sedlarce had 1,521 residents with the following ethnic composition:

- Albanians 1,482
- Persons for whom data are taken from administrative sources 36

According to the 2002 census, the village had a total of 1,776 inhabitants. Ethnic groups in the village include:

- Albanians 1,773
