= Sedlarevo =

Sedlarevo Седларево Sallarevë
- Village
- Location within North Macedonia
- Coordinates: 41°53′N 21°08′E
- Country: North Macedonia
- Region: Polog
- Municipality: Želino

Population (2021)
  - Total: 419
- Time zone: UTC+1 (CET)
  - Summer (DST): UTC+2 (CEST)
- Car plates: TE
- Website: .

Sedlarevo (Macedonian: Седларево, Albanian: Sallarevë) is a village in the municipality of Želino, North Macedonia.

== Demographics ==
Sedlarevo is attested in the 1467/68 Ottoman tax registry (defter) for the Nahiyah of Kalkandelen. The village had a total of 14 Christian households and 3 widows.

As of the 2021 census, Sedlarevo had 419 residents with the following ethnic composition:

- Albanians 379
- Persons for whom data are taken from administrative sources 40

According to the 2002 census, the village had a total of 1,611 inhabitants. Ethnic groups in the village include:

- Albanians 1,605
- Bosniaks 2
- Others 4
