= Sretkovo =

- Village
- Сретково
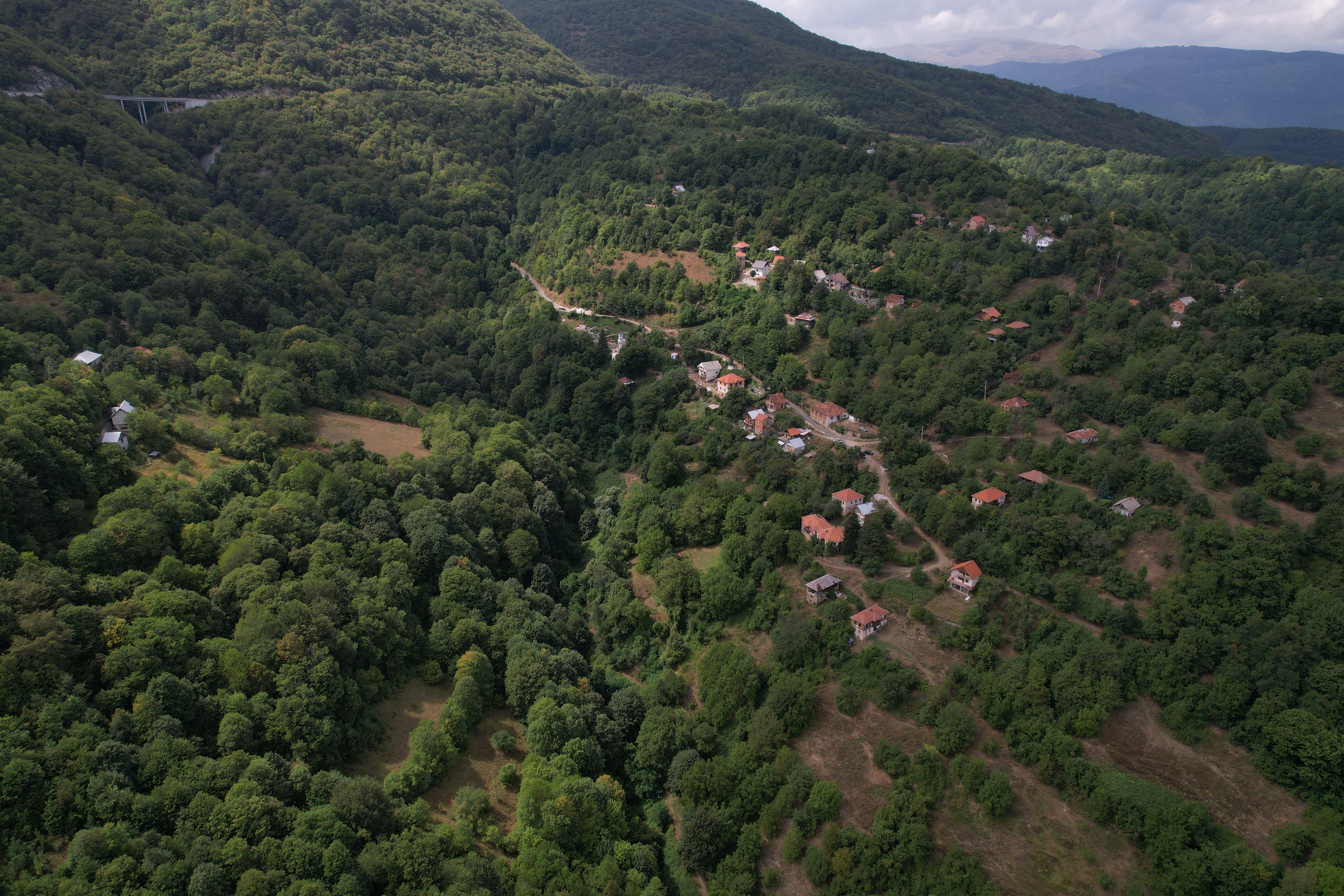
- Airview of the village

- Location within North Macedonia
- Coordinates: 41°42′N 20°51′E
- Country: North Macedonia
- Region: Polog
- Municipality: Mavrovo and Rostuša

Population (2002)
  - Total: 25
- Time zone: UTC+1 (CET)
  - Summer (DST): UTC+2 (CEST)
- Car plates: GV
- Website: .

Sretkovo (Macedonian: Сретково) is a village in the municipality of Mavrovo and Rostuša, North Macedonia.

== Demographics ==
According to the 1942 Albanian census, Adžievci was inhabited by 290 Serbs.

According to the 2002 census, the village had a total of 25 inhabitants. Ethnic groups in the village include:

- Macedonians 25
