= Žerovjane =

Žerovjane Жеровјане Zherovjan
- Village
- Location within Republic of Macedonia
- Coordinates: 41°55′N 20°57′E
- Country: North Macedonia
- Region: Polog
- Municipality: Bogovinje

Population (2021)
  - Total: 891
- Time zone: UTC+1 (CET)
  - Summer (DST): UTC+2 (CEST)
- Car plates: TE
- Website: .

Žerovjane (Macedonian: Жеровјане, Albanian: Zherovjan) is a village in the municipality of Bogovinje, North Macedonia.

== History ==
Žerovjane is attested in the 1467/68 Ottoman tax registry (defter) for the Nahiyah of Kalkandelen. The village had a total of 30 Christian households, 2 bachelors and 3 widows.

According to the 1467-68 Ottoman defter, Žerovjane exhibits a majority of Orthodox Christian Slavic and a minority Albanian anthroponymy. Some families had a mixed Slav-Albanian anthroponomy.

In statistics gathered by Vasil Kanchov in 1900, the village of Bogovinje was inhabited by 60 Christian Bulgarians. According to the 1942 Albanian census, Žerovjane was inhabited by 277 Muslim Albanians.

== Demographics ==
As of the 2021 census, Žerovjane had 891 residents with the following ethnic composition:

- Albanians 881
- Persons for whom data are taken from administrative sources 10

According to the 2002 census, the village had a total of 914 inhabitants. Ethnic groups in the village include:

- Albanians 907
- Macedonians 3
- Turks 4
