= Battle of Polog =

1453 battle in the Balkans

Battle of Polog Beteja e Pollogut
- Part of the Albanian–Ottoman Wars (1432–1479)
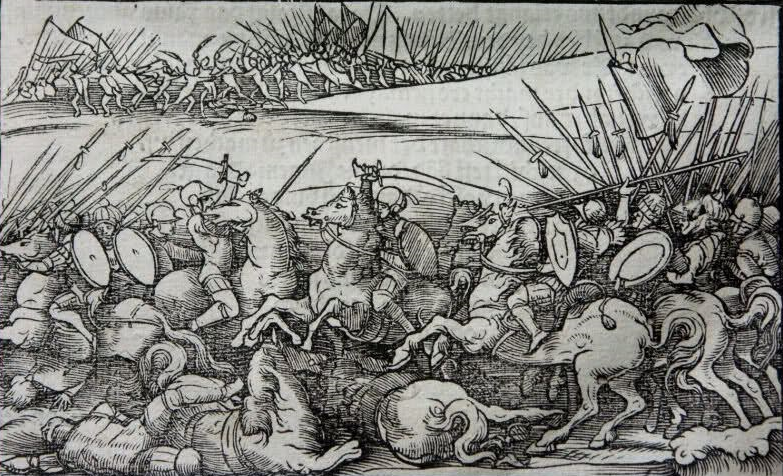
- 16th century engraving by Jost Amman
Date	22 April 1453
Location	Polog, near Tetovo, Ottoman Empire (modern day North Macedonia)
Result	Albanian victory

Belligerents
League of Lezhë	Ottoman Empire

Commanders and leaders
Skanderbeg	(Ottoman Empire) Ibrahim Pasha †

Strength
Unknown	14,000

Casualties and losses
300 killed	3,000–10,000 killed

The Battle of Polog (Albanian: Beteja e Pollogut) was the result of an Albanian incursion into Ottoman territory. Aided by Alfonso the Magnanimous, the Albanian leader Skanderbeg made plans to recapture Svetigrad, which had been lost in 1448. His strategy involved launching an invasion of Macedonia to devastate the country surrounding Svetigrad and to lure the garrison into a trap. While implementing this, he was stopped in the fields of Polog near Tetovo by a force which was planning to invade Albania led by his old friend Ibrahim Pasha. The force was quickly destroyed and Skanderbeg's army proceeded its looting before returning to Debar.

== Background ==
Skanderbeg lost Svetigrad in 1448 after a two-month-long siege. The fortress was vital to his strategic defense of Albania as it guarded one of the main mountain passes into the country from Macedonia. He, therefore, made efforts to regain it with the help of Alfonso V of Aragon; in the Treaty of Gaeta signed in 1451, Skanderbeg became a vassal of Alfonso in return for financial and military aid for his ongoing war with the Turks. In the winter of 1452, Skanderbeg made plans for his offensive and thus received much-needed artillery and arquebuses from Alfonso.

== Prelude ==
In the spring of 1453, Skanderbeg moved into Macedonia. During the night, Skanderbeg's army marched through a severe storm, hoping to surprise the Turks. Near Tetovo Skanderbeg's force met an opposing Ottoman force of 14,000 men led by Ibrahim Pasha, one of Skanderbeg's old friends during his service in the Ottoman army. Skanderbeg ordered the march to halt and made plans to retreat into the Mokra valley, hoping to entice his opponent into a trap. But Ibrahim did not follow and instead bivouacked on the field of Polog. This maneuver blocked further incursions into Macedonia.

In the Albanian camp, battleplans were being made while the Turkish camp remained quiet. Moisi Arianit Golemi proposed making a night attack but Skanderbeg was reluctant since a powerful storm was sweeping through, making it difficult to launch an attack; Hamza Kastrioti supported Moisiu.

== Battle ==
Skanderbeg's doubts soon faded and he made plans for an attack on his enemy's camp. On 22 April, despite the storms, Skanderbeg launched a swift cavalry attack which broke into the enemy camp causing disorder and chaos. Skanderbeg confronted Ibrahim and challenged him to a personal duel. Skanderbeg came out victorious and beheaded his opponent. His head was placed on a pike in a manner similar to Władysław III of Poland's execution and upon being informed, the Turkish troops quickly fled.

== Aftermath ==
According to Marin Barleti, the Ottomans lost 10,000 men, while the Albanians lost 300. According to Francione, the Turks left behind 3,000 dead. Skanderbeg's army continued fighting before returning to Debar. The same year, the Byzantine Empire fell after the fall of Constantinople.
