= Novo Selo, Mavrovo i Rostuše =

Novo Selo
- Village
- Ново Село
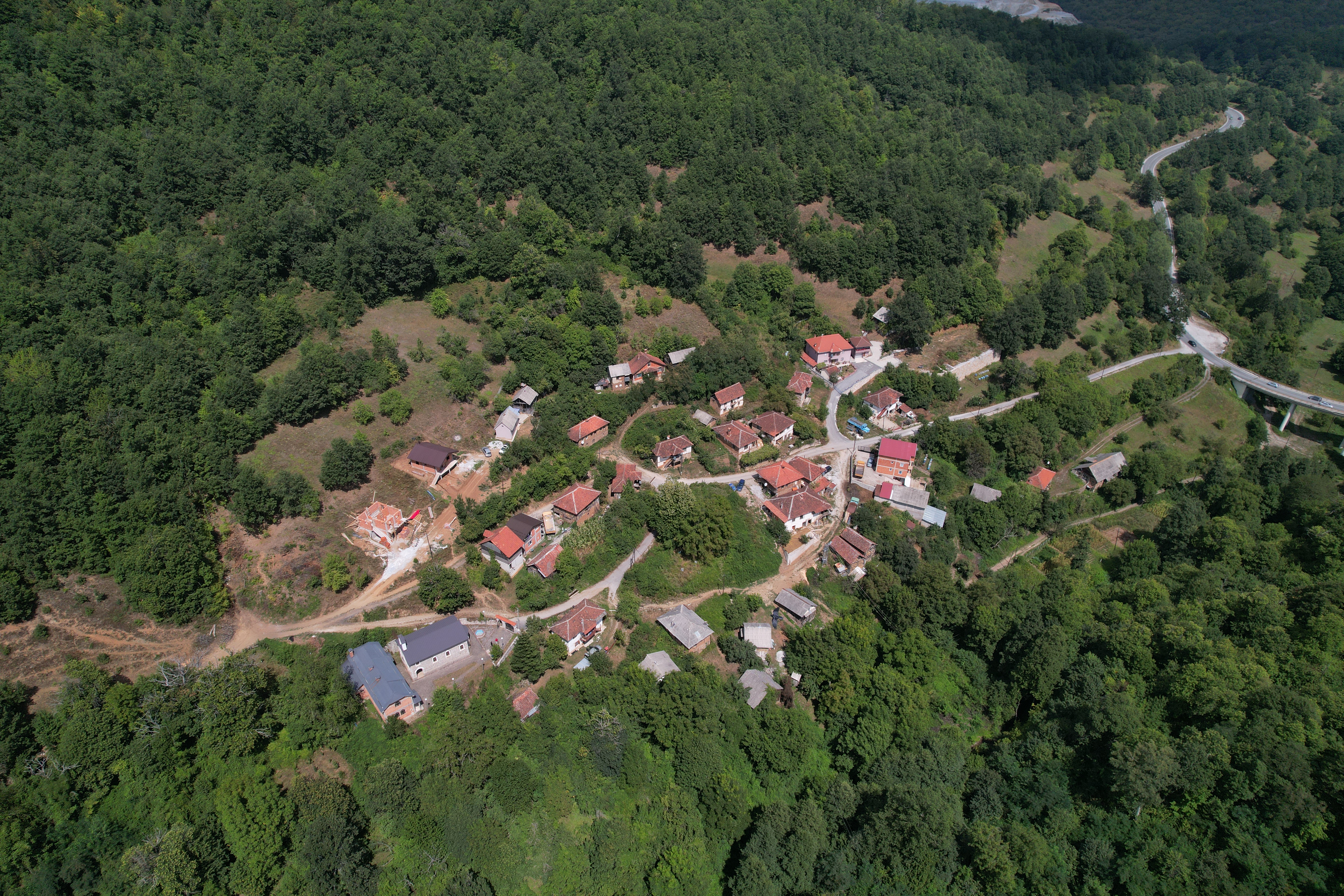
- Airview of the village

- Location within North Macedonia
- Coordinates: 41°43′51″N 20°49′48″E
- Country: North Macedonia
- Region: Polog
- Municipality: Mavrovo and Rostuša

Population (2002)
  - Total: 33
- Time zone: UTC+1 (CET)
  - Summer (DST): UTC+2 (CEST)
- Car plates: GV
- Website: .

Novo Selo (Macedonian: Ново Село) is a village in the municipality of Mavrovo and Rostuša, North Macedonia. The etymology of the village comes from Slavic languages meaning new village, Novo Selo.

== Demographics ==
According to the 1942 Albanian census, Novo Selo was inhabited by 173 Serbs.

According to the 2002 census, the village had a total of 33 inhabitants. Ethnic groups in the village include:

- Macedonians 33
