= Kalište, Vrapčište =

Kalište Калиште Kalisht
- Village
- Location within North Macedonia
- Coordinates: 41.879385°N 20.861019°E
- Country: North Macedonia
- Region: Polog
- Municipality: Vrapčište

Population (2021)
  - Total: 511
- Time zone: UTC+1 (CET)
  - Summer (DST): UTC+2 (CEST)
- Car plates: GV
- Website: .

Kališti (Macedonian: Калиште, Albanian: Kalisht) is a village in the municipality of Vrapčište, North Macedonia. It used to be part of Negotino-Pološko Municipality.

== History ==
Kalište is attested in the 1467/68 Ottoman tax registry (defter) for the Nahiyah of Kalkandelen. The village had a total of 25 Christian households and 2 bachelors.

== Demographics ==
As of the 2021 census, Kalište had 511 residents with the following ethnic composition:

- Albanians 482
- Persons for whom data are taken from administrative sources 29

According to the 2002 census, the village had a total of 681 inhabitants. Ethnic groups in the village include:

- Albanians 668
- Macedonians 1
- Others 12

According to the 1942 Albanian census, Kalište was inhabited by 669 Muslim Albanians.
