= Brvenica Municipality =

Municipality of North Macedonia

Coordinates: 41.98°N 20.98°E

Municipality of Brvenica Општина Брвеница Komuna e Bërvenicës
- Rural municipality
- Flag Coat of arms

- Country: North Macedonia
- Region: Polog
- Municipal seat: Brvenica

Government
  - Mayor: Arkin Jahiji (DUI)

Area
  - Total: 164.3 km^{2} (63.4 sq mi)

Population
  - Total: 13,645
  - Density: 96.5/km^{2} (250/sq mi)
- Time zone: UTC+1 (CET)
- Postal code: 1216
- Area code: 044
- Vehicle registration: TE

Brvenica (Macedonian: Брвеница, Macedonian: macedonian Municipality) is a municipality in the northwestern part of North Macedonia. Brvenica is also the name of the village where the municipal seat is found. Brvenica Municipality is part of the Polog Statistical Region.

== Geography ==
The municipality borders Tetovo Municipality to the north, Želino Municipality to the east, Makedonski Brod Municipality to the southeast, Gostivar Municipality to the southwest, Vrapčište Municipality to the west and Bogovinje Municipality to the northwest.

== Demographics ==
According to the 2021 North Macedonia census, Brvenica Municipality has 13,645 inhabitants. Ethnic groups in the municipality:

	2002		2021	
	Number	%	Number	%
TOTAL	15,855	100	13,645	100
Albanians	9,770	61.62	7,377	54.06
Macedonians	5,949	37.52	5,715	41.88
Serbs	78	0.49	40	0.29
Bosniaks	1	0.01	6	0.04
Roma			1	0.01
Turks	2	0.02		
Other / Undeclared / Unknown	55	0.34	29	0.22
Persons for whom data are taken from administrative sources			477	3.5

- Demographic Trends Live births by ethnic affiliation of mother, 2010-2022

	Macedonians		Albanians		Others		TOTAL
Year	Births	%	Births	%	Births	%	Births
2010	74	40.22	110	59.78	0	0.00	184
2011	62	33.70	122	66.30	0	0.00	184
2012	45	25.86	129	74.14	0	0.00	174
2013	53	28.19	135	71.81	0	0.00	188
2014	69	35.94	121	63.02	2	1.04	192
2015	62	32.98	126	67.02	0	0.00	188
2016	52	31.52	112	67.88	1	0.61	165
2017	58	35.58	105	64.42	0	0.00	163
2018	53	35.33	96	64.00	1	0.67	150
2019	47	30.52	107	69.48	0	0.00	154
2020	63	42.86	83	56.46	1	0.68	147
2021	35	29.17	85	70.83	0	0.00	120
2022	24	20.51	91	77.78	2	1.71	117
2023	22	19.13	93	80.87	0	0.00	115
