= Gostivar Municipality =

Municipality of North Macedonia

Coordinates: 41°48′N 20°55′E

Municipality of Gostivar Општина Гостивар Komuna e Gostivarit
- Urban municipality
- Flag Coat of arms

- Country: North Macedonia
- Region: Polog
- Municipal seat: Gostivar

Government
  - Mayor: Valbon Limani

Area
  - Total: 513.39 km^{2} (198.22 sq mi)

Population
  - Total: 59,770
  - Density: 158/km^{2} (410/sq mi)
- Time zone: UTC+1 (CET)
- Vehicle registration: GV
- Website: Official Website

Population of Gostivar. (11 January 1945)

Gostivar (Macedonian: Гостивар [ˈɡɔstivar]; Albanian: Komuna e Gostivarit) is a municipality in the western part of North Macedonia. Gostivar is also the name of the town where the municipal seat is found. The municipality is part of the Polog Statistical Region.

== Geography ==
The municipality borders

- the Mavrovo and Rostuša, Kičevo municipalities to the south,
- Makedonski Brod Municipality to the east,
- Brvenica and Vrapčište municipalities to the north, and
- Albania and Kosovo to the west.

== Demographics ==
The municipality has 35 inhabited places, one town and 34 villages. According to the 2021 North Macedonia census, this municipality has 59,770 inhabitants.

| | 2002 | | 2021 | |
| | Number | % | Number | % |
| TOTAL | 81,042 | 100 | 59,770 | 100 |
| Albanians | 54,038 | 66.68 | 33,076 | 55.34 |
| Macedonians | 15,877 | 19.59 | 12,807 | 21.43 |
| Turks | 7,991 | 9.86 | 7,597 | 12.71 |
| Roma | 2,237 | 2.76 | 2,273 | 3.8 |
| Serbs | 160 | 0.2 | 73 | 0.12 |
| Bosniaks | 39 | 0.05 | 25 | 0.04 |
| Vlachs | 15 | 0.02 | 17 | 0.03 |
| Other / Undeclared / Unknown | 685 | 0.84 | 493 | 0.83 |
| Persons for whom data are taken from administrative sources | | | 3,409 | 5.7 |

Mother tongues among the municipality residents include:

- Albanian: 33,204 (55.6%)
- Macedonian: 14,313 (24.0%)
- Turkish: 7,576 (12.7%)
- Romani: 1,087 (1.8%)
- Others: 181 (0.3%)
- Persons for whom data are taken from administrative sources: 3,409 (5.7%)

== History ==
Several villages were burned down in Gostivar during 1912-16 by Serbian and Bulgarian forces. Two of these villages were Reč, which had a population in 1900 of 140 Muslim Albanians and 150 Orthodox Albanians, and Strezimir which at that time was inhabited by 56 Muslim Albanians and 180 Orthodox Albanians. Another such example is Štirovica.

On 26 November 2019, an earthquake struck Albania and Gostivar Municipality contributed humanitarian aid and teams of firefighters and doctors toward the relief effort for earthquake victims.
