= Polog Statistical Region =

Coordinates: 41°48′00″N 20°55′12″E

Polog Statistical Region Полошки Регион Rajoni i Pollogut
- Statistical region
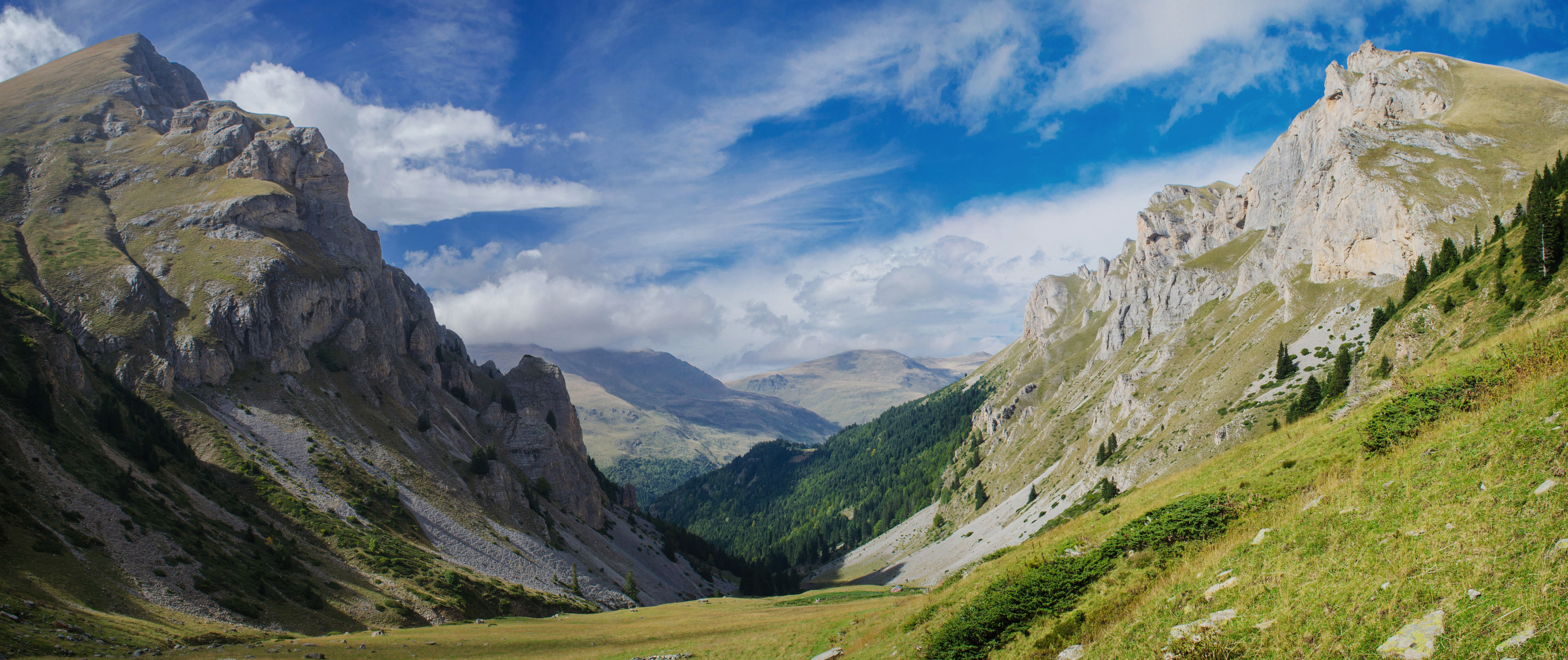
- Šar Mountains

- Coat of arms

Area
  - Total: 2,479 km^{2} (957 sq mi)

Population (2021)
  - Total: 251,552
  - Density: 101.5/km^{2} (262.8/sq mi)
- HDI (2017): 0.767 high · 6th of 8
- Website: rdcpolog.mk

The Polog Statistical Region (Macedonian: Полошки Регион, romanized: Pološki Region; Albanian: Rajoni i Pollogut) is one of eight statistical regions of the Republic of North Macedonia. Polog, located in the northwestern part of the country, borders Albania and Kosovo. Internally, it borders the Southwestern and Skopje statistical regions.

== Municipalities ==
The municipalities of the Polog statistical region

Polog is divided into 9 municipalities:

- Bogovinje
- Brvenica
- Gostivar
- Jegunovce
- Mavrovo and Rostuša
- Tearce
- Tetovo
- Vrapčište
- Želino

== Demographics ==
Map of the majority ethnic groups in the region.

=== Population ===
The current population of the Polog statistical region is 304,125 citizens, according to the last population census in 2002.

Census Year	Population	Change
1994	282,432	N/A
2002	304,125	+8.24%
2021	251,552	-17.4%

=== Ethnicities ===
The largest ethnic group in the region are the Albanians (68.91%) followed by the Macedonians (17.21%), Turks (6.04%), Roma (1.7%).

	2002		2021
	Number	%	Number	%
TOTAL	304,125	100	251,552	100
Albanians	222,679	73.22	173,344	68.91
Macedonians	56,079	18.44	43,285	17.21
Turks	17,394	5.72	15,182	6.04
Roma	4,717	1.55	4,264	1.7
Serbs	977	0.32	494	0.2
Bosniaks	251	0.08	271	0.1
Vlachs	30	0.01	31	0.01
Others / Undeclared / Unknown	1,998	0.66	2,021	0.8
Persons for whom data are taken from the administrative sources			12,660	5.03

== See also ==
- Polog
