= Rogačevo =

- Village
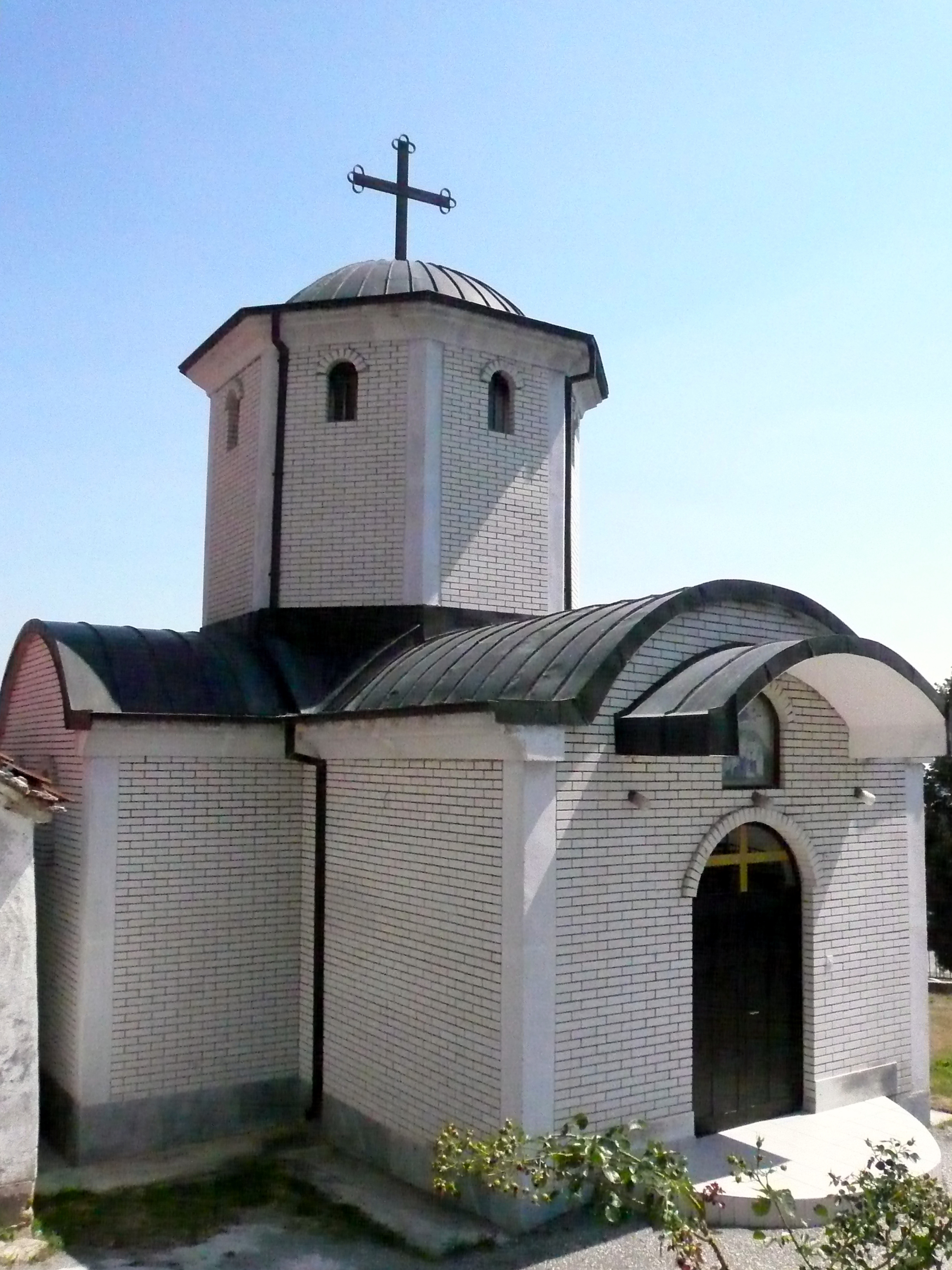
- Church in Rogačevo

- Location within North Macedonia
- Coordinates: 42.1566267°N 21.1570716°E
- Country: North Macedonia
- Region: Polog
- Municipality: Jegunovce

Population (2002)
  - Total: 347
- Time zone: UTC+1 (CET)
  - Summer (DST): UTC+2 (CEST)
- Car plates: TE
- Website: .

Rogačevo is a small village located in the north-western part of North Macedonia, 26 km away from the city of Tetovo and 1 km away from the village of Jažince, the border crossing point with Kosovo. It used to be part of the former municipality of Vratnica.

Žerovjane is Rogačevo in the 1467/68 Ottoman tax registry (defter) for the Nahiyah of Kalkandelen. The village had a total of 59 Christian households and 4 bachelors.

Rogacevo is situated in the upper part of the Polog plain, at the foothills of the northern part of the Šar Mountains, under the Luboten peak. Around a hundred houses are present with about 500 people living here. Since the time the village was founded, it has been Christian Orthodox.

According to the 2002 census, the village had a total of 347 inhabitants.

In statistics gathered by Vasil Kanchov in 1900, the village of Rogačevo (Rogachevo) was inhabited by 210 Christian Bulgarians.
