= Operation Bessemer =

British operation in Macedonia in 2001

Operation Bessemer was the United Kingdom's contribution to Operation Essential Harvest, which was a NATO operation meant to disarm and destroy armaments in the possession of the NLA (National Liberation Army) following the 2001 insurgency in Macedonia. This took place after the ratification of the Ohrid Agreement that ultimately ended the conflict and promised improved rights to the Albanian citizens living in Macedonia. The main squadron task was to support the weapons collection operation and was officially launched on 22 August. The UK suffered only one casualty during the operation, Sapper Ian Collins, who was killed when a concrete block struck him on the head after being thrown at his vehicle. The UK 2 PARA was in command during the operation and withdrew to the UK on 12 October 2001.

== Context ==
Macedonia declared independence from Yugoslavia on 8 September 1991, and was the only ex-Yugoslav republic that was able to do so non-violently. This newly independent country was primarily composed of two ethnic groups, the Ethnic Macedonian majority, and the ethnic Albanians, who were the largest minority. While there was tension between the two groups, they coexisted until the beginning of 2001.The main cause of tension was the repression by the Macedonian governments on the use of the Albanian language in Macedonia and the ban of the use of the Albanian flag in public institutions.

=== 2001 Insurgency ===
Leading up to the conflict, groups of armed Albanians started opening fire on Macedonian police located on the border with Yugoslavia, with the first attacks occurring in the small village of Tanuševci. Conflicts between the NLA, Albanian National Army, and the Macedonian Army began to escalate, until eventually after mediation by OSCE and NATO, along with receiving increased pressure to halt hostilities, the Macedonian Government agreed to sign an unconditional ceasefire prompted by NATO. The ceasefire agreement was signed on 5 July 2001, by army general Pande Petrovski, by the President, and by police general Risto Galevski from the Macedonian side, and by the NATO representative Peter Feith.This ceasefire was violated consistently by the NLA until the Ohrid Framework Agreement.

=== Ohrid Agreement ===
The Ohrid Framework Agreement put an end to the armed conflict on 13 August 2001. The agreement included a number of provisions meant the increasing the rights of ethnic Albanians in Macedonia, while also altering the official languages of the country, where any language spoken by over 20% of the population becomes co-official with the Macedonian Language. As a result of the Agreement, the Macedonian government agreed to a new model of decentralization, and the Albanian side agreed to give up any separatist demands and to recognize Macedonian institutions. Most important to Operation Bessemer, the agreement also demanded the NLA to disarm and present any arms to NATO.

In accordance with the Ohrid Agreement NATO began Operation Essential Harvest, officially launched on 22 August 2001. On 23 August 2001, nearly 700 British Paratroopers joined a 400-strong British advance contingent who were already setting up headquarters near Skopje and arms collection points around Macedonia. This force was lightly armed and was specifically equipped not to be part of a wider peace keeping role, but rather specifically for the 30 day operation to collect rebel arms. The total force involved in Operation Essential Harvest grew to approximately number 4,800, and involved troops from 2nd Battalion, The Parachute Regiment, 9 Parachute Squadron RE and members of the SAS working in the A.O.R. The British contribution to this operation was named Operation Bessemer and was primarily responsible for the disarmament of the NLA. As the NLA operated primarily in the mountains of Western Macedonia, the terrain was eminently suitable for light operations. 2 PARA took under command multiple squads, including 9 Para squadron RE and the Dutch Coy. An Italian Mechanized Squadron was also placed under command for the third mission to Brodec. The force led by 2 PARA successfully undertook 3 periods of major arms collections operations before withdrawing to the UK on 12 October. Sapper Ian Collins was the only UK death from the operation after he was struck in the head by a concrete block thrown at his vehicle. He was flown back to the UK on 31 October 2001 for burial, and spattering of news articles published about him sparked a minor controversy over NATO involvement in Macedonia. After his death, the UK foreign secretary, Jack Straw, backed the governments actions to commit troops despite this controversy, stating that it was justified to prevent another bloody Balkans conflict. This mirrored sentiment at the time of the reaction to earlier Balkan's conflicts like the 1st and 2nd Balkan Wars. Overall the mission seized 3,875 different weapons from the NLA, including Tanks, Air Support Weapons, Mortars, Machine Guns, and Assault Rifles.

Weapon Type	1ST PERIOD (27–30 AUGUST	2ND PERIOD (7–13 AUGUST)	3RD PERIOD (20–26 SEPTEMBER)	TOTAL
Tanks/APCs:	0	2	2	4
Air Defense Weapons Systems:	3	6	8	17
Support Weapons Systems (Mortars, Anti-Tank Weapons, etc.):	69	42	50	161
Machine Guns:	194	184	105	483
Assault Rifles:	944	1,037	1,229	3,210
Total:	1,210	1,271	1,394	3,875

=== UK Units Engaged in Operation Bessemer ===
- 16th Air Assault Brigade
- 9 Parachute Squadron RE
- The 2nd Battalion The Parachute Regiment (2 PARA)

=== Aftermath ===
After the weapons were gathered in their entirety, they were transported to a site at Krivolac, where they were publicly destroyed. NATO then declared the operation a success, collecting more than the agreed upon 3,000 weapons. Even so, NATO was heavily criticized by the Macedonian community for not collecting enough weapons. The (VRMO) Internal Macedonian Revolutionary Organization Prime Minister even demanded at one point that NATO should collect no less than 30,000 weapons. Just months after the conclusion of the operation, a secret arms cache was discovered by Macedonian police and army officials. The cache contained rocket launchers, anti-tank mines, machine-guns, hand grenades, and other various explosives. Further arms collection action and gun law amendments were then drafted by the VRMO, and implemented by the Ministry of Interior.

==== Citations ====
1. Netherlands Ministry of Defence. "The Dutch contribution to Operation Essential Harvest in Macedonia." Defensie.nl, 8 September 2017. Available at: https://english.defensie.nl/topics/historical-missions/mission-overview/2001/operation-essential-harvest/dutch-contribution. Accessed 12 Nov 2025. Ministry of Defence
2. Huggler, Justin. "British soldier killed by mob in Macedonia." The Independent, 28 Aug 2001. Available at: https://www.the-independent.com/news/world/europe/british-soldier-killed-by-mob-in-macedonia-9240288.html. Accessed 12 Nov 2025. The Independent
3. Kim, Julie. Macedonia: Country Background and Recent Conflict (CRS Report RL30900). Congressional Research Service (The Library of Congress), Updated 28 March 2002. Available at: https://web.archive.org/web/20160325040729/https://fas.org/man/crs/RL30900.pdf. Accessed 12 Nov 2025. EveryCRSReport+1
4. "Nato launches Macedonia mission." The Telegraph, 22 August 2001. Available at: https://www.telegraph.co.uk/news/1338179/Nato-launches-Macedonia-mission.html. Accessed 12 Nov 2025. Telegraph
5. Paradata. "Macedonia (Operation Bessemer)." Paradata.org.uk. Available at: https://paradata.org.uk/content/4634946#:~:text=22/08/2001%20-%2012,... (accessed link truncated). Accessed 12 Nov 2025. Paradata
6. "NATO statement: Number of weapons to be collected from the so-called NLA." ReliefWeb, 20 August 2001. Available at: https://reliefweb.int/report/former-yugoslav-republic-macedonia/nato-statement-number-weapons-be-collected-so-called-nla? Accessed 12 Nov 2025.
7. South Eastern Europe Clearinghouse for the Control of Small Arms and Light Weapons (SEESAC). A Fragile Peace: Guns and Security in post-conflict Macedonia. Belgrade: SEESAC, 2004-01-04. Available at: https://www.seesac.org/f/docs/SALW-Surveys/A-Fragile-Peace--Guns-and-Security-in-post-conflict-Macedonia-.pdf. Retrieved 13 Nov 2025.
