= 1996–1997 Macedonian protests =

The 1996–1997 Macedonian protests were mass rioting and popular demonstrations led by students and Albanians in Macedonia against discrimination of Albanians, the ban of the Albanian flag and economic hardships.

== Background ==
A new law on local elections was issued in 1996. The Democratic Party of Albanians won candidates in several municipalities in the western of the country. The mayor of Gostivar, Rufi Osmani, and mayor of Tetovo, Alajdin Demiri, displayed the Albanian national flag on municipality buildings despite that it was forbidden according to the Constitution. This led to controversy, and debate in the Macedonian public over whether the government should intervene and take down the Albanian flags. Since June there had been a debate in the parliament about the use of the Albanian flag, some MPs supporting that it be allowed to be hoisted on public holidays and other festivities. The announcement of Macedonian parties that they would take down the flags caused a heated atmosphere in the Albanian community.

== Protests ==
The protests began when students led mass protests in Albanian-minority universities against the near total-ban on the Albanian language in Tetovo. Protesters marched and threw stones at the security forces, turning the peaceful protesters into rioters. Three demonstrators were killed during the clashes at the protest sites. Initial protests first began in May–June 1995 against the closing of eight state-run television broadcasts; the response was to reinstate the television satellites. Protesters demonstrated in July, March and January, demonstrating against the ban in municipalities and constitutional buildings of the Albanian flag. 4 were killed in the ensuing battles in July amid a wave of violent street demonstrations and gunfire strikes in the Albanian-majority cities. The Unrest in Gostivar and Tetovo (1997).

== See also ==
- Unrest in Gostivar and Tetovo (1997)
