= Macedonian Conflict =

Macedonian Conflict may refer to:

- The Macedonian Struggle (late 1800s–1912), between Greek, Bulgarian, Serbian, Albanian partisans and the Ottoman government over the Macedonia region
- The 2001 insurgency in Macedonia, between ethnic Albanians in Macedonia and the Macedonian government
