= Fadil Nimani =

Albanian insurgent commander (1967–2001)

- Born: 7 April 1967; Gjakova, SFR Yugoslavia, (today Kosovo)
- Died: 25 May 2001 (aged 34); Vaksince, Macedonia
- Military career
- Allegiance: Kosovo Liberation Army (KLA); National Liberation Army (NLA)
- Service years: 1996–2001
- Rank: Commander
- Nickname: "Komandant Tigri"
- Units: "Rrufeja" battalion (KLA, Kosovo); 114th Brigade (NLA, Macedonia)
- Commands: Dukagjin Operational Zone (KLA, Kosovo); Kumanovo area (NLA, Macedonia)
- Conflicts: Kosovo War; 2001 insurgency in Macedonia; Operation MH-2; Battle of Vaksince †

Fadil Nimani (Albanian: Fadil Nimani; Macedonian and Serbian Cyrillic: Фадил Нимани; 7 April 1967 – 25 May 2001) was a Kosovar Albanian insurgent commander of the Kosovo Liberation Army (KLA) during the Kosovo War and the National Liberation Army (NLA) during the 2001 insurgency in Macedonia.

He was appointed commander of the 114th Brigade of the NLA, active in the Kumanovo region, and had about 150 people under his command. He was killed by Macedonian special forces in an operation during the Macedonian insurgency, on 25 May 2001. A statue has been erected by ethnic Albanian politicians and former NLA fighters at Vaksince in his honour.

== Biography ==
Nimani was born on 7 April 1967, in the village of Gergoc, in the municipality of Gjakova. He went to secondary school in his village, and gymnasium in the nearby village of Cermjane. An armed uprising led by Kosovo Albanian nationalists against Serbian rule erupted in the region in 1991, when an Albanian irredentist organization that came to be known as the Kosovo Liberation Army first emerged. At this time it is known that the organization underwent military training in Albania. In 1997, the Serbian police sought to arrest him, along with Jakup Krasniqi and Hashim Thaçi, for "murders and kidnappings of civilians, as well as attacks on the army and police of Yugoslavia". Nimani had joined the Kosovo Liberation Army by 1998 and initially smuggled weapons from Albania at the beginning of the Kosovo War. In the end of 1998, he was appointed a commander in the "Dukagjin Zone" (Metohija, known as 'Dukagjini' in Albanian), and subsequently became the commander of the "Rrufeja" (Lightning) battalion. He was nicknamed "Komandant Tigri".

Insurgency conflict areas.

Ali Ahmeti organised the NLA of former KLA fighters from Kosovo and Macedonia, Albanian insurgents from Preševo, Medveđa and Bujanovac in Serbia, young Albanian radicals and nationalists from Macedonia, and foreign mercenaries. During the Macedonian insurgency, which began in January 2001, Nimani was appointed the commander of the 114 Brigade of the NLA, active in Kumanovo, namely from Matejče to Nikuštak. The 111, 113 and 114 brigades operated in Skopska Crna Gora, while 112 operated in Tetovo, 115 around Skopje, and 116 in Gostivar. His armed group included around 150 people. He was also the commander of the "Skënderbeu" Special Unit. During the one-month-long battles in the Kumanovo region, the Macedonian security forces managed to recapture several villages that were NLA strongholds and clear them from the insurgents' presence. According to Macedonian official claims, security forces killed at least 30 NLA insurgents (NLA claims they lost 16); one of which was confirmed as Nimani (killed on 26 May 2001), who had been liquidated during the operation for the liberation of Vaksince which was occupied by the NLA. The 114th brigade was then commanded by Nazim Bushi, known as commander Adashi, and the brigade's number rose to about 1000 fighters.

Since his death, there is an anniversary in Vaksince in honour of him. On 17 March 2006, former fighters from the NLA organized a commemoration for Nimani and 16 other NLA guerrilla fighters that died during the battles for Vaksince, in the village of Matejche near Kumanovo. The commemoration was attended by German NATO soldiers. A statue has been erected at Vaksince in his honour.
