= Tanuševci =

Village in Čučer-Sandevo, North Macedonia

Tanuševci Танушевци Tanushë
- Village
- Location within North Macedonia
- Coordinates: 42°14′28″N 21°23′48″E
- Country: North Macedonia
- Region: Skopje
- Municipality: Čučer-Sandevo

Population (2021)
  - Total: 304
- Time zone: UTC+1 (CET)
  - Summer (DST): UTC+2 (CEST)
- Car plates: SK
- Website: .

Tanuševci (Macedonian: Танушевци, Albanian: Tanushë) is a village in the municipality of Čučer-Sandevo, Republic of North Macedonia.

== Name ==
Tanuševci, in local Albanian Tanushë comes from the name Tanush. Tanush is the Albanian variant of the Greek given name Athanasius, loaned from Latin. Where the fricative /θ/ becomes the stop /t/, this shows that the name passed through Latin before entering Albanian; the Greek-derived equivalent is the name and onomastic element Thanas. The Albanian definite form is Tanushi. In Latin, it was written Tanusius, while in Italian Tanussio and Tanusso.

Other people / places with similar etymologies are

- Tanusio Thopia (fl. 1329–38), Angevin Albanian count
- Tanush Thopia (died 1467), nobleman
- Little Tanush (fl. 1423–33), nobleman
- Tanuše (Albanian: Tanushaj), an Albanian village of the Upper Reka region, Mavrovo and Rostuša Municipality, North Macedonia

== History ==
The settlement was mentioned in the 15th century as Tanushevc. Between 1929 and 1941, the village was part of the Vardar Banovina in the Kingdom of Yugoslavia, while between 1941 and 1944, it was part of Albania. In 1999, the village served as a base for the Kosovo Liberation Army during the Kosovo War. After the border demarcation agreement between the Federal Republic of Yugoslavia and Republic of Macedonia (now North Macedonia), which ceded the village to Macedonia and was received negatively by the locals, the National Liberation Army (NLA) launched an attack against it. During the 2001 insurgency in Macedonia, NLA held Tanuševci, proclaiming it as "liberated territory".

== Demographics ==
As of the 2021 census, Tanuševci had 304 residents with the following ethnic composition:

- Albanians 212
- Persons for whom data are taken from administrative sources 92

According to the 2002 census, the village had a total of 417 inhabitants. Ethnic groups in the village include:

- Albanians 409
- Others 8
