= Unrest in Gostivar and Tetovo (1997) =

- Part of the 1996–1997 Macedonian protests and the prelude to the 2001 insurgency in Macedonia
- Date: 9 July 1997
- Location: Gostivar and Tetovo, Macedonia
- Caused by: Confiscation of the Albanian and Turkish flags from government buildings in Gostivar and Tetovo; Arrest of Albanian politicians and activists, including the mayors of Gostivar and Tetovo; Discrimination against Albanians in Macedonia
- Goals: Release of Rufi Osmani and other arrested Albanian politicians; Protection of the Albanian flags from the Macedonian police
- Methods: Protests; Demonstrations; Riots; Civil unrest; Civil resistance
- Result: Albanian protests fail: Hundreds of Albanians beaten and/or detained in government crackdown; Macedonian police suppressed the protests; Albanian protesters fail to accomplish their demands; Mass detentions of Albanians and DPA members suspected of attending the demonstrations in the following days

Parties
(North Macedonia) Macedonian Government; Macedonian police	(Albania) Local Albanian protesters

Lead figures
Tomislav Čokrevski	No centralised leadership

Casualties and losses
9 policemen injured	(Albania) 3 protesters killed (Albania) 200+ protesters injured (Albania) 320 protesters arrested

A period of unrest occurred in the cities of Gostivar and Tetovo, Macedonia, after the police removed the Albanian and Turkish flags from municipal buildings, on 9 July 1997.

== Background ==
During the mid-1990s, two municipalities in western Macedonia elected Albanian mayors: Rufi Osmani in Gostivar, and Alajdin Demiri in Tetovo. After their election, the flag of Albania and the flag of Turkey were featured alongside the flag of Macedonia on municipal buildings. Both mayors regarded the Albanian flag as the flag of Albanians in general. On 21 May 1997, the Constitutional Court ruled that the display of foreign flags in public was a violation of Macedonian state sovereignty. Osmani told people not to accept the decision and that Gostivar would become an Albanian town. On 21 May, some people removed both flags. 20,000 Albanians demonstrated against the removal and the flags were restored on 27 May, and guards were put by the local government to protect them. On 8 July, the Macedonian parliament passed the Law on the Use of Flags, which permitted the display of international flags on private property at any given time and in front of city halls during public holidays.

== Unrest ==
On 9 July 1997, around 3 a.m., special police forces entered Gostivar and Tetovo. Osmani, the president of the city council and other DPA members and activists were detained. The police removed the Albanian and Turkish flags from the city halls. Afterwards, an Albanian crowd protested against the removal of their flag and called for the release of Osmani. They responded to the appeal by Osmani "to protect the flag with their blood." In the ensuing riot, 3 Albanians got killed, around 200 people were injured (including 9 police officers) and 320 people were arrested. Police seized control of city entrances and reinforced their presence on squares and streets in the city. The police also beat detainees in public and broke into private homes without a warrant, beating and detaining individuals who had not been involved. According to the Interior Ministry, the police found unregistered firearms in the municipal halls in Gostivar and Tetovo, as well as encountering three armed guards, one in Tetovo and two in Gostivar. Charges were also filed against Demiri and the president of Tetovo's city council.

== Aftermath ==
On 10 July, the police beat a number of people, either on the street or in detention. On the same day, Prime Minister Branko Crvenkovski visited the police in Gostivar and praised their work on national television. Interior Minister Čokrevski also praised the work of the police. Macedonian president Kiro Gligorov expressed condolences for the victims but said that a state could (and should) protect its national symbols. On 17 September 1997, Osmani was sentenced to thirteen years and eight months in prison for violating Articles 319 ("inciting national, racial, and religious hatred, discord, and intolerance") and 377 ("neglect to exercise a court ruling") of the Macedonian Penal Code, while Demiri was sentenced to two years and six months on 14 October for disobeying a decision of the constitutional court. VMRO-DPMNE condemned the verdict against Osmani. The European Parliament on 17 December 1998 adopted a resolution that called for their release. Under the new coalition government of VMRO-DPMNE and Democratic Party of Albanians, an amnesty law was passed in January 1999. After initially refusing, Gligorov signed the law on 6 February. The mayors were freed in March 1999.

In reaction to the Law on the Use of Flags, VMRO-DPMNE and World Macedonian Congress filed an initiative to the Macedonian Constitutional Court, to scrutinize its legality and constitutionality. On 9 December 1998, the Constitutional Court repealed the law. The Court decided that it was not possible for members of nationalities living on the territory of the Republic of Macedonia and whose home countries are elsewhere to express their sovereignty with state symbols (flags) of other countries, thus the use of the state flags of the Republic of Albania or the Republic of Turkey as national or ethnic flags of the communities in Macedonia was not permitted. The ruling was passed with a majority, while two Albanian judges dissented, who said that ethnic Albanians have the right to believe that the Albanian flag is also the national flag and symbol of all Albanians. Osmani filed an application against the state at the European Court of Human Rights (ECHR), complaining of violations of Article 10 (freedom of expression) and Article 11 (freedom of assembly) of the European Convention on Human Rights. The ECHR determined that there had been an interference with the freedom of peaceful assembly, but found it as justified and rejected the application. The unrest was a prelude to the 2001 conflict between Albanian rebels and Macedonian security forces, which ended the same year with the Ohrid Agreement, granting more rights to Albanians.

== See also ==
- 1996-1997 Macedonian protests
