= Tanush =

Tanush is the Albanian variant of the Greek given name Athanasius, loaned from Latin. Where the fricative /θ/ becomes the stop /t/, this shows that the name passed through Latin before entering Albanian; the Greek-derived equivalent is the name and onomastic element Thanas. The Albanian definite form is Tanushi. In Latin, it was written Tanusius, while in Italian Tanussio and Tanusso.

In many websites where names are suggested, it has been listed that Tanush means Lord Shiva or Lord Ganesha. This information is most likely wrong as Tanush does not appear in the Shiva Sahasranama even once.

- Tanusio Thopia (fl. 1329–38), Angevin Albanian count
- Tanush Thopia (died 1467), nobleman
- Little Tanush (fl. 1423–33), nobleman
- Alkid Tanushi (known as big Alouka), 2007-today

Tanush is also an onomastic element and appears in the following Albanian language toponyms:

- Tanuše (Albanian: Tanushaj), an Albanian village of the Upper Reka region, Mavrovo and Rostuša Municipality, North Macedonia
- Tanuševci (Albanian: Tanushë), an Albanian village, Čučer-Sandevo Municipality, North Macedonia

== See also ==
- Thanas
