= Vaksince =

Vaksince Ваксинце Vaksincë
- Village
- Location within North Macedonia
- Coordinates: 42°12′N 21°40′E
- Country: North Macedonia
- Region: Southeastern
- Municipality: Lipkovo

Population (2021)
  - Total: 1,808
- Time zone: UTC+1 (CET)
  - Summer (DST): UTC+2 (CEST)
- Car plates: KU
- Website: .

Vaksince (Macedonian: Ваксинце, Albanian: Vaksincë) is a village in the municipality of Lipkovo, North Macedonia.

== History ==
Vaksince, like the whole region of Macedonia, belonged to the Ottoman Empire for centuries. When it fell apart at the beginning of the 20th century, Albania gained independence on November 28, 1912, during which the majority of citizens in and around Vaksince were in favor of their region belonging to this new state. However, Serbia was able to persuade the great powers that most of the Albanian settlement areas in Macedonia came under its rule, including Vaksince. Between 1918 and 1991 Vaksince belonged to Yugoslavia and since then to North Macedonia.

The Macedonian-Albanian conflict in 2001

In 2001, Vaksince was one of the scenes of the Albanian Uprising in Macedonia. The place gained notoriety beyond the borders of the Republic of Macedonia because strong armed clashes between the Albanian insurgents, who belonged to the NLA, and the Macedonian army took place here in May of that year. Albanian fighters killed two Macedonian soldiers and captured a third near the village. The Macedonian army then attacked Vaksince with attack helicopters and artillery fire. The Macedonian troops managed to shoot the commander of the Albanian insurgents, Fadil Nimani. After that, the shelling of the place was stopped.

Overall, several Albanian civilians, two NLA fighters and two Macedonian soldiers and police officers lost their lives in the clashes over Vaksince. The two Albanian parties in Macedonia condemned the actions of the NLA and the threat to Albanian civilians from the army's artillery fire.

Vaksince, like other places in the region, was then closely monitored by the international missions of the OSCE, NATO and the EU. The Macedonian army and police had no control over Vaksince at times even after the clashes. In autumn 2003 the village was occupied again by the Macedonian army.

To this day there are many Albanians in the region who want to join Kosovo. In September 2007, there was a shootout between former NLA fighters and the Macedonian police. Two people were killed, including the commander of the regional police.

== Demographics ==
As of the 2021 census, Vaksince had 1,808 residents with the following ethnic composition:

- Albanians: 1,728
- Persons for whom data are taken from administrative sources: 78
- Others: 2

According to the 2002 census, the village had a total of 2479 inhabitants. Ethnic groups in the village include:

- Albanians: 2,474
- Others: 5
