= Tanuše =

Tanuše Тануше Tanushaj
- Village
- Location within North Macedonia
- Coordinates: 41°43′N 20°34′E
- Country: North Macedonia
- Region: Polog
- Municipality: Mavrovo and Rostuša

Population (2021)
  - Total: 2
- Time zone: UTC+1 (CET)
  - Summer (DST): UTC+2 (CEST)
- Car plates: GV
- Website: .

Tanuše (Macedonian: Тануше, Albanian: Tanushaj) is a village in the municipality of Mavrovo and Rostuša, North Macedonia.

== History ==
In 1913, the imam of Tanuše, Malik Mema was the leader of an uprising in Upper Reka against Serbian military forces that managed to free all villages up to Zdunje, near Gostivar. During the 2001 insurgency in northern Macedonia, Macedonian armed forces and police desecrated part of the interior of the village mosque so as to prevent possible usage by Albanian National Liberation Army (NLA) units. Due to the village of Tanuše being affected by the conflict, some residents migrated thereafter to other places.

== Demographics ==
In statistics gathered by Vasil Kanchov in 1900, the village of Tanuše was inhabited by 350 Muslim Albanians.

As of the 2021 census, Tanuše had 2 residents with the following ethnic composition:

- Albanians 2

According to the 2002 census, the village had a total of 16 inhabitants. Ethnic groups in the village include:

- Albanians 16

== See also ==
- Tanush (name)
