= Thanas =

Thanas is an Albanian and Ukrainian (Танас) given name and onomastic toponym element. The definite form is Thanasi. It is derived from the Greek Athanasios, with the Latin derived equivalent Tanush. Thanas is also considered to be a saint by Albanian Christians, under the name Thanas.

== As a given name ==
People with the name Thanas are typically Albanian Christians, and include:

- Thanas Floqi (1884–1945), Albanian educator and patriot
- Thanas Kantili, founder of the Diturija Albanian society in Bucharest.
- Thanas Shkurti (died 2012), Albanian diplomat

== As a toponym ==
Medieval Albanians used the names of saints to form various toponyms, including Saint Thanas (Albanian: Shën Thanas). Forms where the fricative /θ/ became the stop /t/ show the Latin-derived rather than the Greek-derived form, and are found in the following toponyms: Shtanë, Shtanas, Shtanaz, Shtanaska.
