= Ljuboten =

Mountain in the Šar Mountains

Coordinates: 42°12′24″N 21°07′10″E

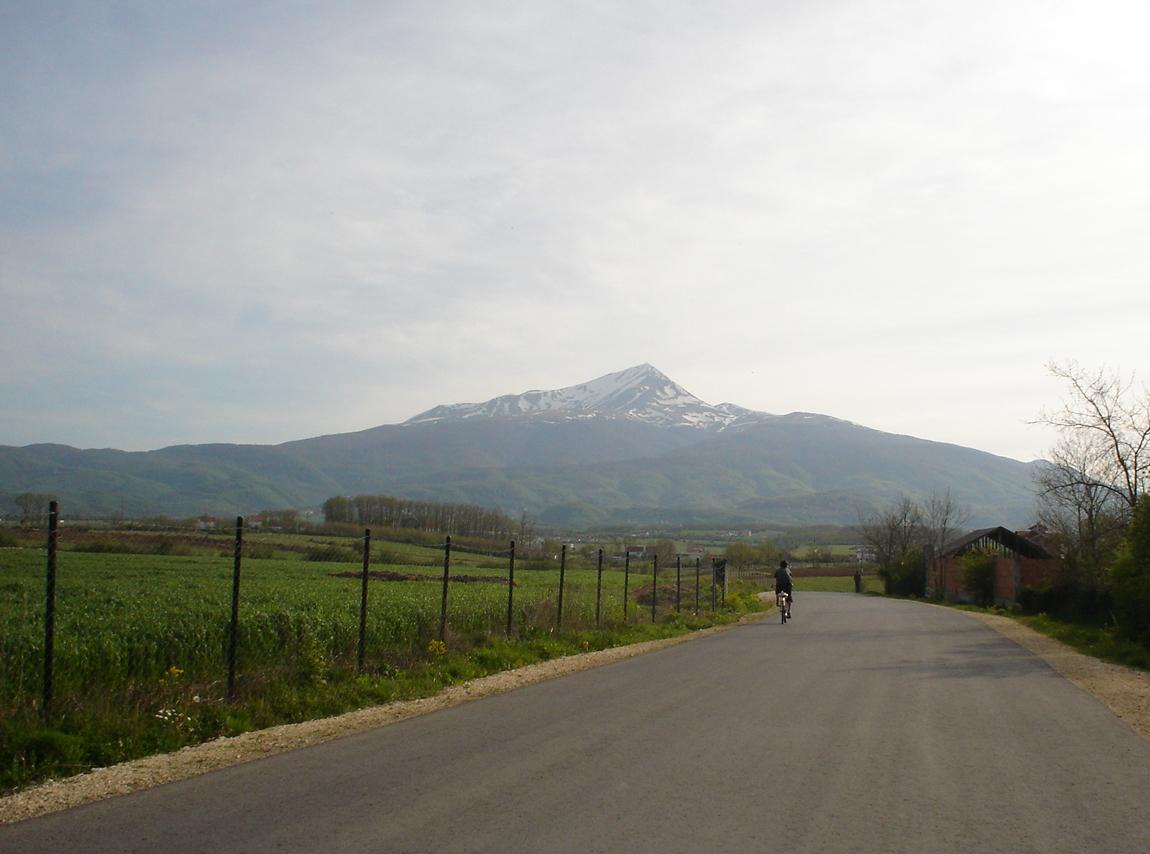
- Ljuboten as seen from Kosovo

Highest point
- Elevation: 2,498 m (8,196 ft)

Geography
- Location: Kosovo and North Macedonia
- Parent range: Šar Mountains

Ljuboten (Serbian and Macedonian: Љуботен) or Luboten (Albanian definite form: Luboteni) is a peak of the Šar Mountains located on the border between Kosovo and North Macedonia. Its elevation is 2,498 m (8,196 ft).

Ljuboten, although not the highest peak of the range, is somewhat isolated from the rest of the mountains, making it visible from both Pristina and Skopje.

The majority of Ljuboten, the north, north-west, east, and south-east sides are located within Kosovo. On the Macedonian side of the peak there is a mountain house called Ljuboten, as well as Shija Ljubotenska ("Ljuboten's Neck"), Kozja Karpa ("Goat's Rock"), Shiljast Kamen ("Pointed Rock"), and Rogacevski Korita.

Ljuboten is a popular destination for mountain climbers in Europe. The mountain is covered with pastures along with rocky outcroppings. Livadh Lake in Kosovo and a few sheepfolds are near the peak. In winter there is usually over a meter of snow. The mountain house at Ljuboten is located in the foothills of the peak, connected with a road to Vratnica.

US soldiers stationed at Camp Bondsteel near the city of Ferizaj colloquially named the peak "Big Duke". The meaning behind the name is not known.

== See also ==
- Vratnica
- FK Ljuboten ("FC Ljuboten")
