= Ratae, Jegunovce =

Ratae Ратае
- Village
- Location within North Macedonia
- Coordinates: 42°02′08″N 21°02′14″E
- Country: North Macedonia
- Region: Polog
- Municipality: Jegunovce

Population (2002)
  - Total: 411
- Time zone: UTC+1 (CET)
  - Summer (DST): UTC+2 (CEST)
- Car plates: TE

Ratae (Macedonian: Ратае) is a village in the municipality of Jegunovce, North Macedonia.

== Demographics ==
According to the 2002 census, the village had a total of 411 inhabitants. Ethnic groups in the village include:

- Macedonians 410
- Serbs 1

According to the 1942 Albanian census, Ratae was inhabited by 253 Serbs and 18 Bulgarians.

In statistics gathered by Vasil Kanchov in 1900, the village of Ratae was inhabited by 105 Christian Bulgarians and 24 Muslim Albanians.
