= Alajdin Demiri =

Albanian politician (1954–2019)

Alajdin Demiri (Macedonian: Алајдин Демири; December 19, 1954 – April 12, 2019) was an Albanian politician known for his role as mayor of Tetovo in the 1997 unrest in Tetovo and Gostivar for which he was later sentenced to two years in prison.

== Life ==
From 1973 until 1977, he studied sociology in Sarajevo, Bosnia. From 1977 to 1978, he worked in Skopje for the television station as a reporter and political commentator in the Albanian language department. From 1978-1983 and 1983–1988, he taught sociology and philosophy at a high school in Tetovo and then worked at the town library, eventually being released from both professions for 'political reasons'. From 1990 to 1995, he studied French in Lausanne, Switzerland, eventually returning in 1995 to be the spokesman of PDP (Party for Democratic Prosperity). As part of the PDP, he was elected mayor of Tetovo in 1997. He was arrested for having the Albanian flag placed on a municipal building and was sentenced to two years in prison. The European Parliament called for his release, and he was freed under an Amnesty Law. From 2000 to 2002, he was the Macedonian ambassador to Switzerland. He died on April 12, 2019, at the age of 65.
