= 2001 insurgency in Macedonia =

2001 conflict

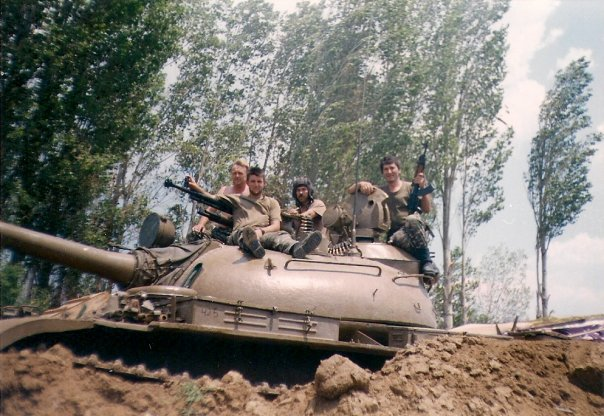
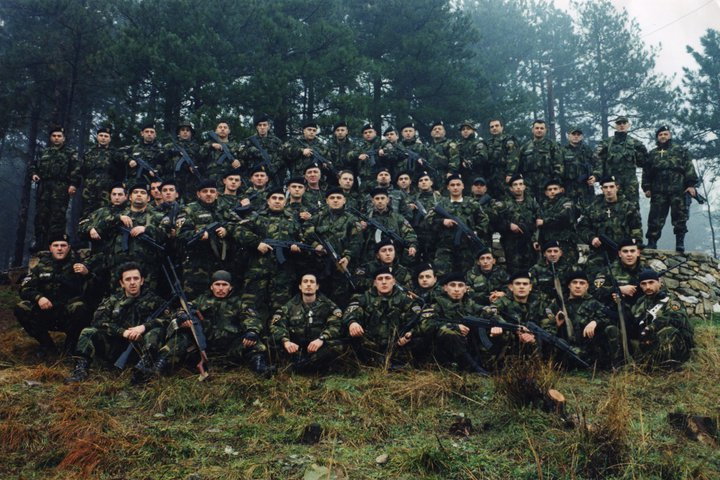
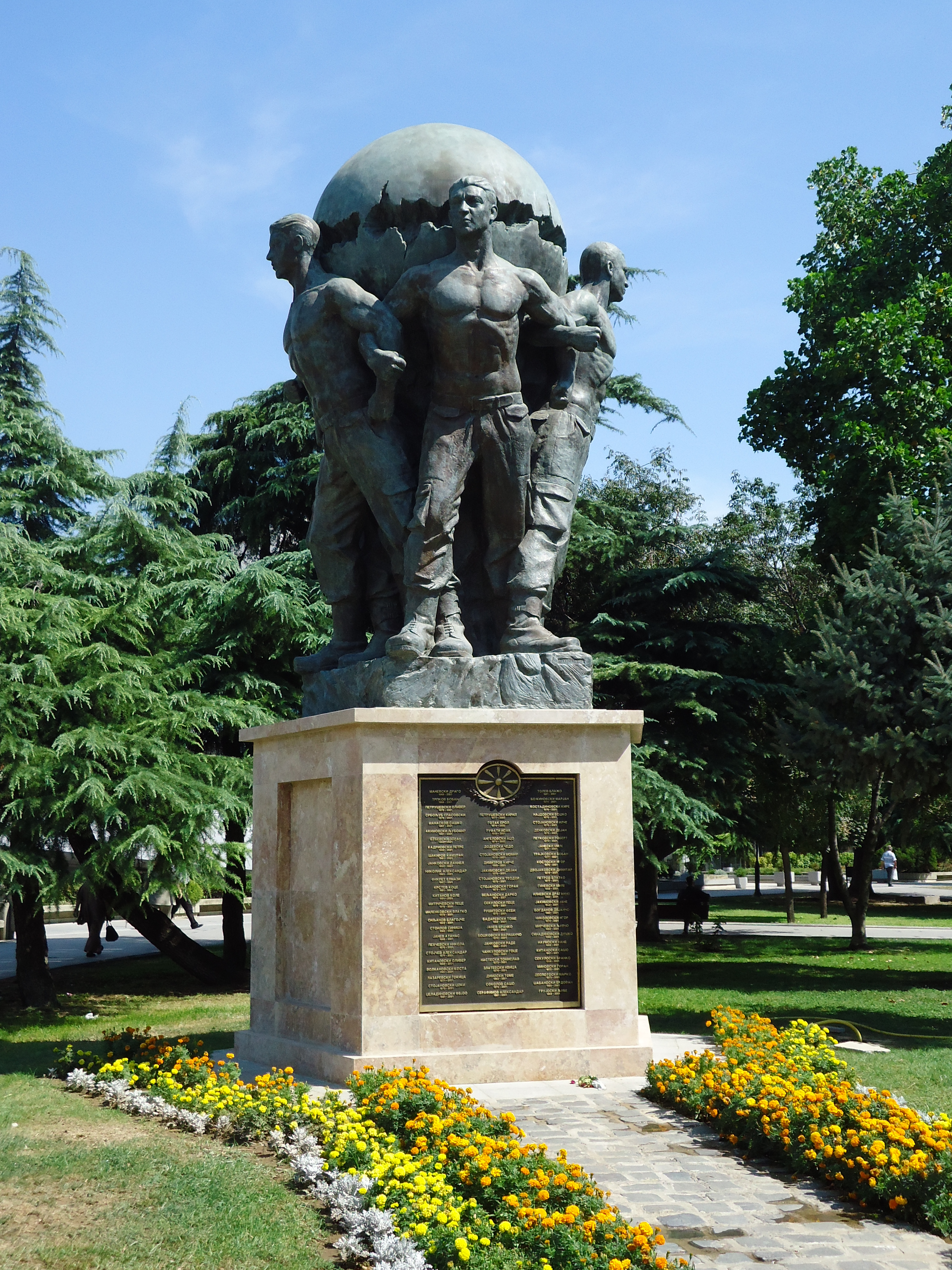
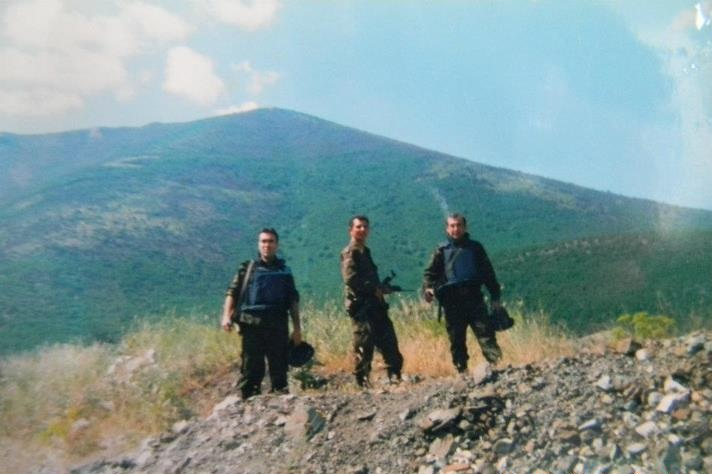
- Clockwise from top left: Macedonian T-55 tank and crew in Aračinovo; A detachment of the Macedonian Special Police Unit for Fast Interventions near Kumanovo, Macedonian police border patrol near Raduša; 2001; Monument of the Defenders of Macedonia.
Date	22 January 2001 – 13 August 2001 (6 months, 3 weeks and 1 day)
Location	Polog and Kumanovo regions of Macedonia
Result	Ohrid Agreement; (see aftermath)

Belligerents
National Liberation Army; Albanian National Army	Macedonia

Commanders and leaders
Ali Ahmeti; Gëzim Ostreni; Xhezair Shaqiri; Harun Aliu; Jetullah Qarri; Jakup Asipi; Tahir Sinani †	(North Macedonia) Boris Trajkovski; (North Macedonia) Pande Petrovski; (North Macedonia) Ljubčo Georgievski; (North Macedonia) Jovan Andrevski; (North Macedonia) Ljube Boškoski; (North Macedonia) Dosta Dimovska; (North Macedonia) Vlado Bučkovski; (North Macedonia) Ljuben Paunovski

Strength
2,000–3,000+ militants (beginning of the war); Unknown	(North Macedonia) 20,000 soldiers and policemen (North Macedonia) 60 T-55 tanks (North Macedonia) 4 Su-25 aircraft (North Macedonia) 4 Mi-24

Casualties and losses
64–105 militants killed	(North Macedonia) 63–77 soldiers and policemen killed (Note: Sources:) (North Macedonia) 3 tanks and 2 APCs captured (North Macedonia) 1 tank and 1 APC destroyed (North Macedonia) 1 Mi-17 crashed
- 150–250 total dead and 1,000 total casualties 70–250 killed in fighting Other: 140,000 people displaced (United Kingdom) One British soldier killed (European Union) Two EU monitors killed

An armed conflict began in the Republic of Macedonia in 2001 when the ethnic Albanian National Liberation Army (NLA) insurgent group, formed with help from UÇK/UÇPMB veterans of both the Kosovo War and Preševo Valley insurgency, attacked Macedonian security forces at the end of January 2001, and ended with the Ohrid Agreement, signed on 13 August of that same year. There were also claims that the NLA ultimately wished to see Albanian-majority areas secede from the country, though high-ranking members of the group have denied this. The conflict lasted throughout most of the year, although overall casualties remained limited to several dozen individuals on either side, according to sources from both sides of the conflict.

== Background ==
When it declared its independence from Yugoslavia on 8 September 1991, Macedonia was the only ex-Yugoslav republic that was able to secede non-violently from the federation. Because of this, Macedonia was considered one of the bright spots in the former Yugoslavia.

Although Macedonia had seceded from Yugoslavia as one of its poorest regions, socio-economic interventions undertaken by the consecutive democratically elected governments managed to improve the economic picture in the country. According to the International Crisis Group, there was nearly 3% growth in 1999. The second half of 2000 also saw steady growth, leading to a 5% GDP increase for the year. In January 2001, the government projected a budget surplus for the second year in a row. In 2000 the country's emerging middle class began buying new cars, adding extensions to apartments and planning summer vacations abroad.

Although the ethnic Macedonian majority and the largest minority, the ethnic Albanians, had co-existed uneasily both before and after the country declared independence in 1991, their relations had generally been peaceful. All of the successive Macedonian governments had included Albanian parties as coalition partners, and several problems were resolved through political dialogue. The mood was more or less optimistic until the beginning of 2001. The main cause for incidents though, was the repression by the Macedonian governments on the use of the Albanian language in Macedonia and the ban of the use of the Albanian flag in public institutions. In 1997 the Constitutional Court restricted the use of the Albanian flag in public institutions to state holidays after the mayors of Tetovo and Gostivar illegally hoisted the Albanian and Turkish flag in the town halls of Gostivar and Tetovo. The removal of the flags sparked protests, and in Gostivar a confrontation between Macedonian police and demonstrators left three civilians dead and several injured on both sides, with police raiding homes without warrants.

The Macedonian Army was formed in 1992 with the withdrawal of the Yugoslav National Army under the agreement that it would take all of its equipment with it, stripping the facilities bare, and mining them for demolition, in some case even army apartments were stripped of wire and plumbing. According to Belgrade newspapers the army removed equipment worth $14 billion and $20 billion which could equip an army of 30,000. This left Macedonia severely weakened and forced Macedonia to rely on donated surplus vehicles and outdated weaponry. For example, the World War II T-34/85 was the main battle tank of the Macedonian Army until the Bulgarian donation of 100 M-30 howitzers and 94 T-55 tanks in 1999.

In 2001 Ukraine was the only supplier of military weapons to Macedonia based on a bilateral military cooperation agreement that started in 1999. Western officials vehemently protested Ukrainian arms shipments to Macedonia. That year, EU secretary-general Javier Solana, U.S. national security advisor Condoleezza Rice visited Kyiv to pressure the Ukrainian government into suspending its arms supplies to Macedonia. Following this, the Ukrainian government agreed to suspend all military sales to Macedonia in July. Some sources include the conflict as part of the Yugoslav Wars, while others exclude it.

=== Ethnic Albanian demands in Macedonia ===
According to the 1994 census, there were 442,914 Albanians in the Republic of Macedonia, making up about 22.9% of the total population of the country (1,936,877). This made them the largest ethnic minority alongside the majority Macedonian population of 1,288,330 (66.5%). In 2001, the Albanians of Macedonia lived largely in compact settlements in the western part of Macedonia, towards the international border with Albania. They also lived in the north-western part of Macedonia, toward the border with the Yugoslav republic of Serbia and the then-UN-administered Kosovo, as well as in the Macedonian capital Skopje and the city of Kumanovo. They also comprised the majority of the population in the Macedonian towns of Tetovo, Gostivar, and Debar.

Since independence, the Republic of Macedonia had been trying to focus on its internal affairs. The promotion of democracy and harmonised inter-ethnic relations had been defined as the main goal of the new state. Since the first democratic elections in 1991, the Albanians of Macedonia used all constitutional and political opportunities to play a significant political role in the country. There were several Albanian political parties, whose behaviour and rhetoric (just as in the case with the parties of the Macedonian political block), depended on whether they were in the governing coalition or not. Despite these political fluctuations, the Albanian parties were included as coalition partners in all post-communist Macedonian governments.

According to the Albanian politician Arben Xhaferi, there was systemic discrimination against Albanians in Macedonia. The Albanian flag was banned from public display. The Albanian language was taught in some schools but could not be used for official correspondence. The United States Department of State reported that the following forms of discrimination against ethnic Albanians continued to exist in Macedonia: limited access to Albanian-language media and education; poor representation in public sector jobs; poor representation in the police corps; poor representation in the military officer corps; denial of citizenship to many long-time ethnic Albanian residents of Macedonia as well as discrimination in the process of citizenship applications; and unfair drawing of voting districts which dilutes their voting strength. Because of these reasons and many more, Albanians in Macedonia began to demand greater political rights. These included making amendments to the constitution to declare the Albanians as a second titular nation of the country, recognising Albanian as a second official language, and providing state support for the underground Albanian-language university in Tetovo. Albanians also claimed to represent as much as 30% and even 40% of the country's population, not the 22.9% recorded in the official June 1994 census.

In 1994, some Albanian politicians in Macedonia advocated for wider collective political rights. In 1994, a prominent manifestation of these demands was the declaration of an autonomous republic called "Ilirida" in the western part of Macedonia. Other pressing issues were the attempted creation of an Albanian language university in Tetovo (1995), declared illegal by Macedonian authorities, as well as the anti-constitutional raising of the Albanian flag in front of the municipal assemblies in Gostivar and Tetovo in 1997 and the ensuing clashes between protesters and police. Macedonians considered these two events as steps towards the creation of "parallel authorities" of the Albanians in Macedonia.

=== Macedonia and the Kosovo crisis ===
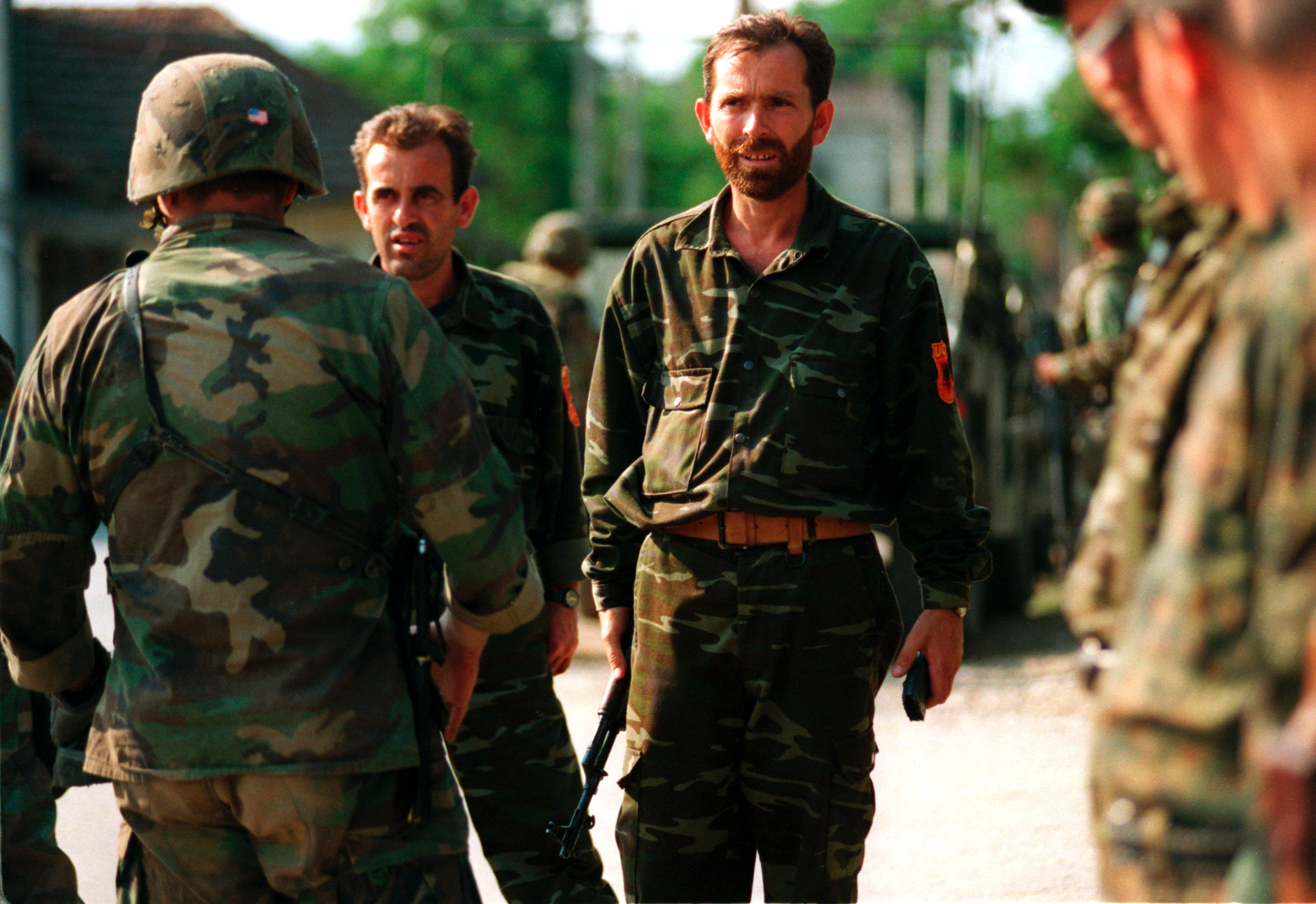
Albanian UÇK insurgents hand over their weapons to U.S. Marines from the 26th Marine Expeditionary Unit in Kosovo, June 1999.

During the conflict in Kosovo in 1999, Macedonia opened its borders to thousands of Kosovo Albanian refugees who were fleeing into the country. According to figures released by the United Nations High Commissioner for Refugees (UNHCR), on 17 May there were 229,300 Kosovo Albanian refugees in Macedonia. The number of Albanian refugees in Macedonia at that stage was more than 11% of the country's population. According to the U.S. Committee for Refugees, around 360,000 Kosovo Albanian refugees repatriated in the second half of 1999.

Macedonia's ability to receive refugees was limited, because contingency planning assumed only 20,000 refugees. Despite all the difficulties, Macedonia accepted refugees according to international standards until the end of the war.

The burden of having to address the needs of 360,000 refugees took its toll on Macedonia's economy. Instead of experiencing modest growth as projected for 1999, the Macedonian economy shrank by as much as 10% of GDP for the rest of 1999. Trade with Yugoslavia, Macedonia's main trading partner, had collapsed, causing Macedonia to lose one of its most important export markets and a vital source of raw materials. Consequently, a number of factories had to close down, adding to already high unemployment. At the same time, the main transit route for Macedonian exports to most of Europe had been closed, increasing the costs for exports. State coffers, almost empty before the outbreak of the crisis, were now practically exhausted.

Macedonians were worried about the impact that more than 360,000 Albanian refugees might have on Macedonia's own ethnic mix. They were afraid that the refugees' presence could disturb the Republic's demographic balance. Macedonians were worried about the possible destructive spill-over effects that could result from the newest phase of the Kosovo conflict and also feared that they had the most to lose. As a Chicago Tribune journalist stated in March 1999, "People are afraid that after Kosovo comes Macedonia."

At the same time, insurgents from the Kosovo Liberation Army began crossing the border and entrenching themselves in Albanian-populated municipalities of the Republic. Macedonian authorities frequently intercepted and seized weapons deliveries en route to Kosovo.

== Initial NLA attack ==
In the prelude to the conflict in late 2000, groups of armed Albanians started opening fire on Macedonian security forces located on the border with the Federal Republic of Yugoslavia. These events appeared to catch the Macedonian government and the international community by surprise. The first attacks occurred in the small village of Tanuševci, located in northern Macedonia near the border with Kosovo.

The conflict began on 22 January 2001, when a group of armed Albanians attacked the police station of the village Tearce near Tetovo, killing a police officer and injuring three others. Arben Xhaferi, leader of the Democratic Party of Albanians, which was a part of the Macedonian government, criticized the attack against the police station and said the following:

The Tetovo incident is part of an orchestrated action against the government and a very crude attempt to overthrow it. Regardless of who is behind it, as a political party we deeply condemn this act. This is a deeply anti-Macedonian act, but also an act against the interests of the Albanians in Macedonia.

In the same month, a group calling itself the National Liberation Army (NLA) claimed responsibility for the attacks against the police. Initial reports gave conflicting information about the NLA. Macedonian President Boris Trajkovski claimed that the rebels were primarily Kosovo Liberation Army (UÇK) members who had infiltrated the country from Kosovo. Macedonian officials accused NATO of not doing enough to disarm the Albanian insurgents, discouraging their encampment in the buffer zone (Ground Safety Zone) area between United Nations–administered Kosovo and FR Yugoslavia, or preventing their entry into Macedonia. The NLA claimed that the rebel force comprised several thousand men, coming mainly from Macedonia.

After a month of clashes, by late February, the Macedonian special police units neutralized the positions of the NLA in Tearce and Tanuševci, temporarily driving them across the border into Kosovo.

=== NATO surveillance of the Kosovar border ===
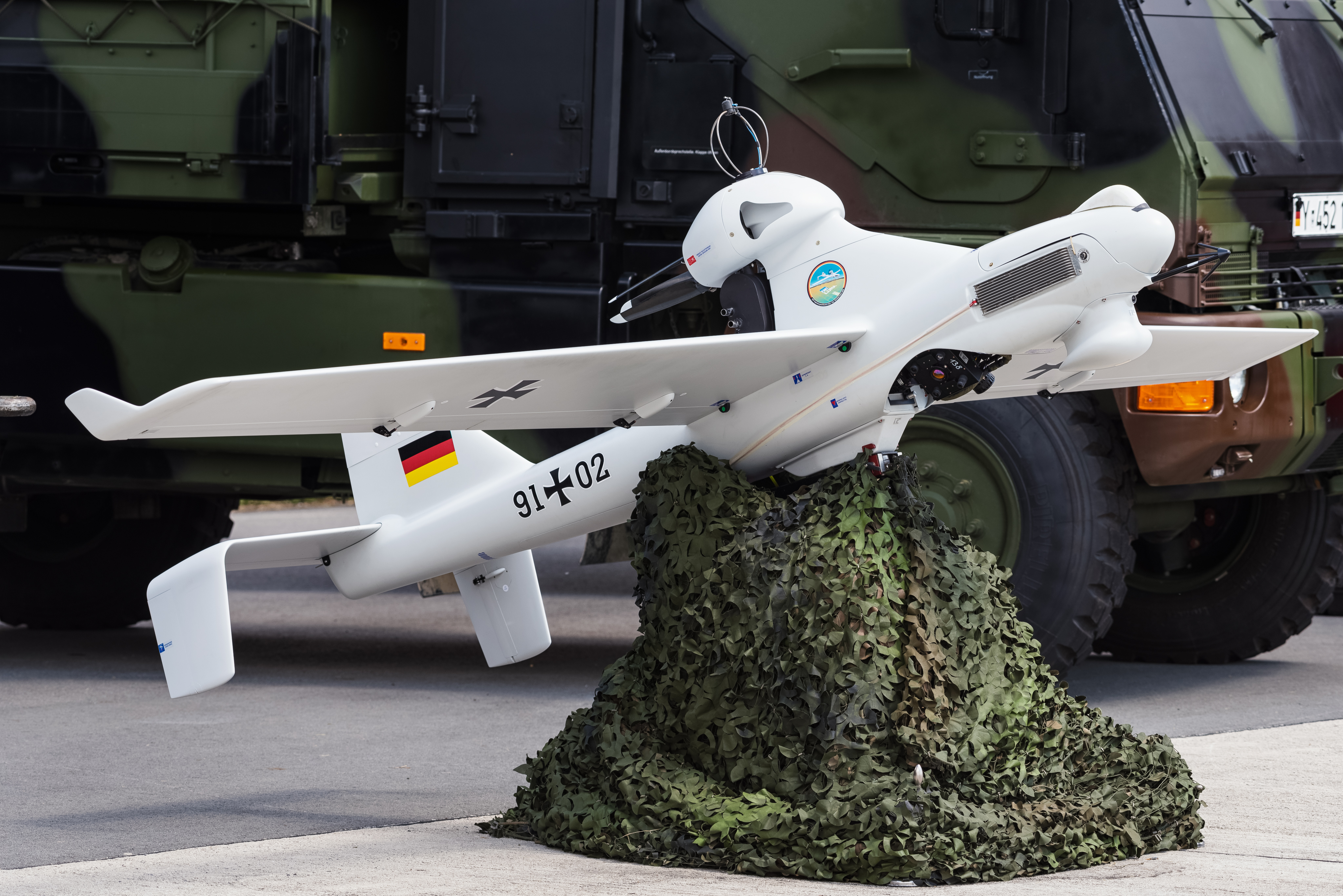
German Luna X-2000 drone

By March 2001, NATO forces deployed in and around Kosovo began to interdict rebel supplies from areas under KFOR control, with surveillance carried out by drones. USAF Predators from the 11th Reconnaissance squadron were moved to the Skopje airport and later replaced by Task Force Hunter, a drone unit made up of IAI RQ-5 Hunter unmanned aircraft. A combined ground and aerial mission was assigned to German troops along their sector of the Macedonian-Kosovar border. Given the mountainous nature of the terrain, there were many dead spots for the observer on the ground. To overcome this disadvantage, the German military integrated the armoured-vehicle-mounted RATAC surveillance radar and the Luna X-2000 UAV. The Luna X-2000 flew a total of 175 sorties, and a number of suspected rebels were arrested. US Army forces of the 2/502nd & 3/502nd Infantry Regiments of the 101st Airborne Division (Air Assault) controlled much of the border. Infantry Squads patrolled the mountains 24/7 conducting clandestine observation and interdiction. Mortar platoons provided illumination support for night observation. On March, KFOR and the Macedonian forces led a joint operation against Albanian rebels in the Macedonian-Kosovar border region, which resulted in the capture of the village Tanuševci. US Forces coordinated with Macedonian Forces to minimize border traffic and activity.

== Fighting in Tetovo ==
In the middle of March, NLA forces reappeared in the hills above Tetovo, a key northwest Macedonian town with an ethnic Albanian majority. The insurgents fired down on Macedonian positions using rifles, machine guns and mortars. At that point the NLA controlled at least seven villages to the north and west of Tetovo, all of which were up in the mountains and easily defensible.

On 22 March 2001, tensions soared further in Tetovo, when two Albanian men, a father and a son, were shot dead during a routine search at a police checkpoint. The incident began when their car was stopped and the officer saw the man reach for his pocket. Fearing it was a grenade, the officer panicked and ran. The man exited the car, dropped to his knees, and threw the grenade at the police checkpoint but failed to explode. A cordon of Macedonian troops, positioned behind sandbags, unleashed a volley of gunfire at the Albanian. At first he slumped against the car, then fell on the curb, dead. Moments later the father was also shot as he tried to run from the car. Despite photographic evidence of the grenade, witnesses later interviewed insisted the father and son died with mobile phones in their hands, claiming that the pair were victims of revenge by police.

The strategic position of the NLA units gave them an overview of the town. The front line between the NLA and the Macedonian security forces expanded along the wooded hills adjacent to the city center to the north. The same day that a front opened in Tetovo, the NLA took control of the medieval city fortress north of the city center, and started shooting at police stationed in the urban areas. After the initial clash, the Macedonian police pushed the NLA out of Tetovo and captured the medieval fortress. The NLA were pushed back into the surrounding hills where several houses were reportedly burning. Medical officials said one person was killed and at least fourteen injured, including eleven police officers.

The government issued an ultimatum asking the National Liberation Army to lay down their arms and leave the country, or face a full-scale offensive. The NLA rejected the ultimatum, announced a unilateral ceasefire, and called for political dialogue. In response, President Trajkovski claimed that the government first had to "neutralize the terrorist threat", but agreed to start a political dialogue with legitimate Albanian political parties in Macedonia.

Prime Minister Ljubčo Georgievski declared, in a televised speech to the nation, that he would not negotiate with "terrorists". He rebuked the United States and Germany, whose troops patrolled the border from the Kosovar side as part of NATO's contingent there, for not doing enough to stop the rebels. Georgievski accused NATO of "creating a new Taliban in Europe" and allowing Albanian extremists to operate out of UN administered Kosovo.

=== Government counter-offensive ===
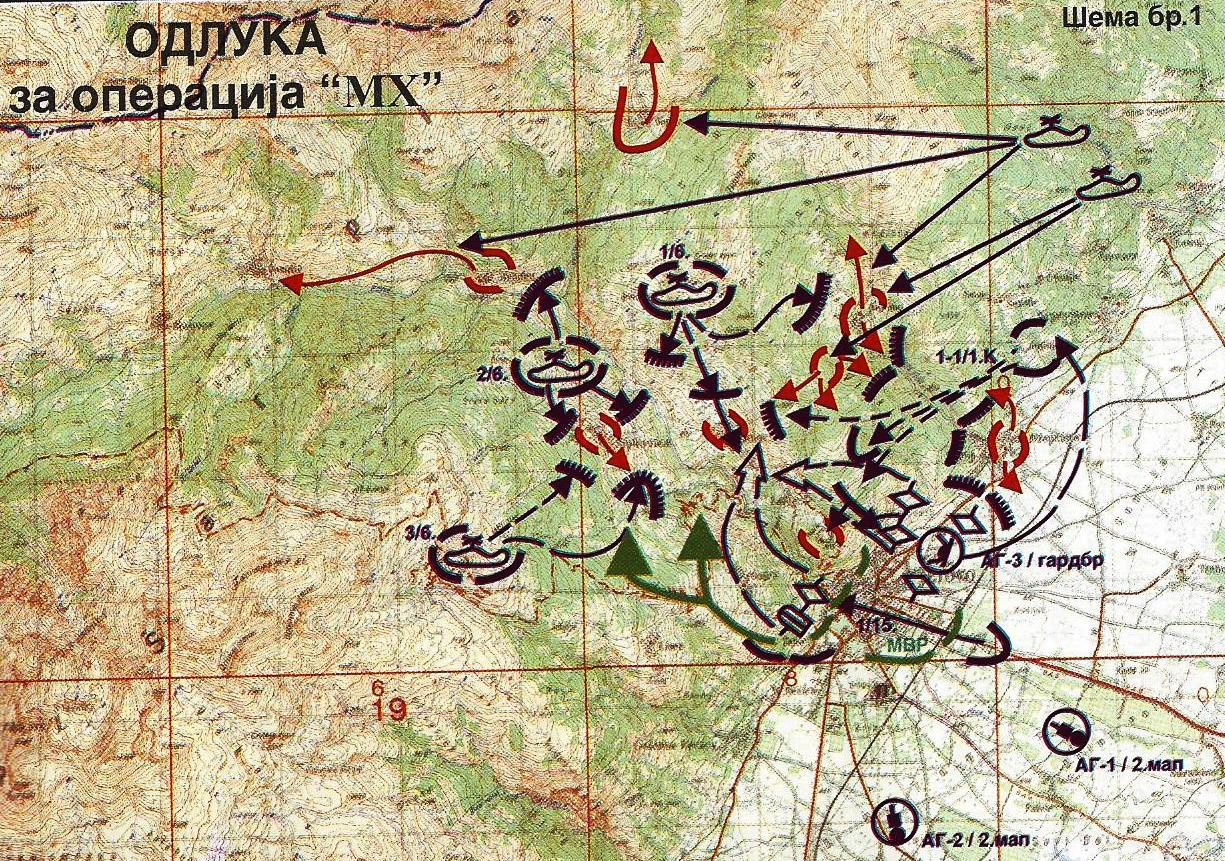
Plan for the military action МH-2 in Tetovo

After five days of guerrilla attacks against government forces in and around Tetovo, on 18 March 2001, the Macedonian government ordered a general mobilization of reservists to execute a wider counter-attack against the National Liberation Army's positions in the hills around Tetovo.

The offensive of the Macedonian security forces was launched against NLA positions on the hillsides overlooking the city on 25 March 2001. While encountering fierce resistance from the rebels, more than two-hundred troops, aided by tanks and mortars, advanced about a kilometer up the hills fighting their way towards the village of Gajre. By early afternoon, the village of Gajre was captured by the police; they entered Šipkovica, but the NLA insurgents put up stiffer resistance at Lavce.

Macedonian government forces continued to move carefully to the north of Tetovo during the second day of the offensive (26 March 2001), consolidating their control of villages that had been held by Albanian rebels for almost two weeks. After the Macedonian security forces' artillery and infantry assault, most of the NLA insurgents had abandoned their positions farther north into the mountains stretching toward Kosovo.

On 28 March 2001, two days after the NLA was driven out from the greater part of Tetovo, Macedonian security forces launched a second offensive, this time directed at clearing the insurgents from their remaining strongholds stretching from east of Tetovo to the village of Tanuševci, north-west of Skopje. During the second offensive, the security forces attacked the NLA positions near the villages of Brest, Malino Malo, Gračani and Gošince, where clashes had taken place earlier in March before the later clashes around Tetovo. The government said the guerrillas fled northwest towards Kosovo, which they "used as a rear base".

On 31 March 2001, the Macedonian government announced an end of its offensive against the NLA armed groups. The Macedonian government claimed to have killed a dozen NLA guerrillas during the offensive. The rebels also claimed to have killed at least a dozen Macedonian border police, however this was denied by security officials. Hospital officials in Tetovo said thirty police officers and ten civilians were wounded. One civilian, an Albanian man, was killed. NLA sources however, confirmed that during the Tetovo offensive of the Macedonian army they had lost seven armed men.

The NLA's dislodging from the hills above Tetovo led to a month-long lull in the conflict.

=== Escalation ===
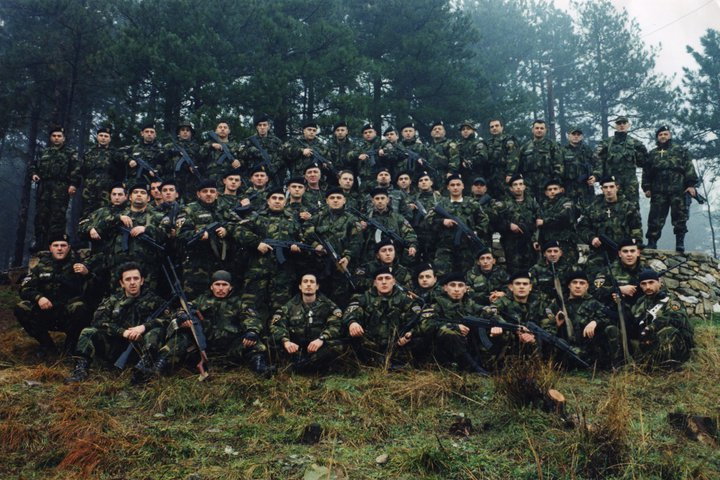
A detachment of the Macedonian Special Police Unit for Fast Interventions near Kumanovo, 2001

During the month-long calm period, a result of the offensive by Macedonian security forces, the government launched roundtable discussions with Macedonian and Albanian political parties on legislative reforms. However, this did not end the violence. On 28 April 2001, eight Macedonian police officers were killed in the Vejce Ambush in an NLA ambush. Reports concluded that the attackers must have been informed by radio about the route of the police vehicle.

Macedonian sources disclosed that the ambush was executed by Ismail Shinasi (alias Komandant Hoxha), Ceka Ilaz (alias Komandant Qori) and Ceka Bilal (alias Komandant Brada) – all three, and most of their people, were born in Kosovo and were veteran members of the Kosovo Liberation Army. Ceka Bilal was a member of the Kosovo Intelligence Agency and was one of the main organizers for weapons smuggling in Kosovo.

In reference to the attack, Macedonian President Boris Trajkovski stated, "We are fighting terrorists, not rebels, and we have exercised the utmost restraint in tackling them".

The killing of the eight Macedonian soldiers and police officers led to riots in Skopje, Bitola, and Veles, during which ethnic Macedonians attacked Albanian-owned businesses and shops. At least ten Albanian shops in the city of Bitola were destroyed, and dozens of buildings were damaged.

To suppress the riots, the Macedonian government imposed a curfew in Bitola, and Premier Georgievski announced that his cabinet considered declaring a state of war to have greater flexibility in fighting the NLA insurgents. According to the Macedonian Constitution a state of war would give enhanced powers to the President and the army, and allow for presidential rule by decree, fewer restraints on the army, the banning of demonstrations, a nationwide curfew, and sealing the country's borders. During the entire conflict, however, the United States urged Macedonia not to declare a state of war in its fight against the NLA.

== Fighting near Kumanovo ==
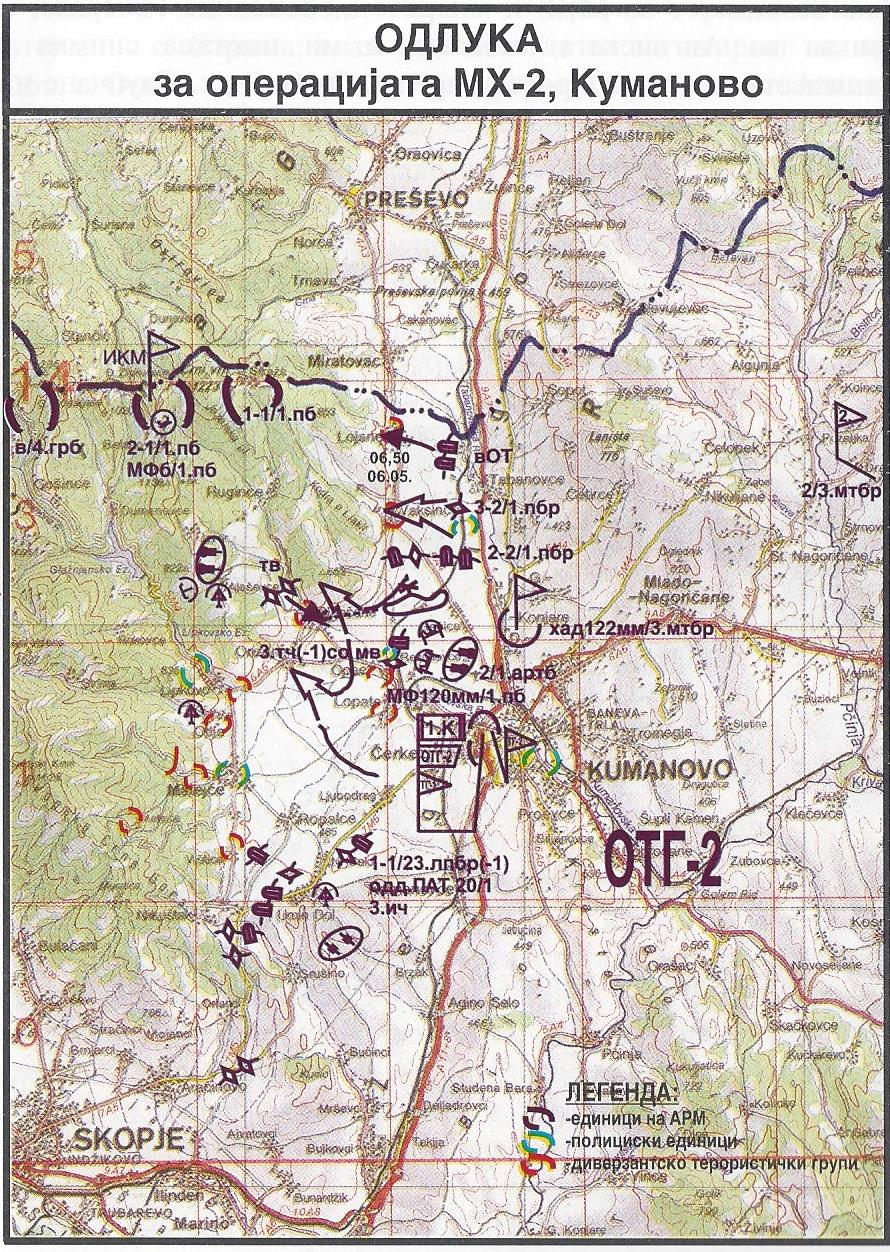
Plan for the military action МH-2 in Kumanovo

On 3 May, the NLA launched an ambush on Macedonian security forces in Vaksince, near Kumanovo, and killed two Macedonian soldiers and kidnapped a third. The three soldiers were on a border patrol which was returning from routine duty when it was ambushed near the village. State radio said that the rebels had claimed the area around Vakcince as their "liberated zone". The rebels then set up bases in villages near Kumanovo. On the same day, the Macedonian security security forces engaged in an operation against the NLA to drive them out of their strongholds in the villages north of Kumanovo. People in the villages held by the NLA were given until 15:00 to evacuate before Macedonian security forces would launch their offensive. Army spokesman Gjordji Trendafilov told the Associated Press that the NLA was holding thousands of villagers as human shields. The offensive started with the shelling of selected targets in Vaksince by military helicopters and field artillery. On 4 May, Lipkovo and Slupčane were also shelled.

In the next several days, Macedonian security forces shelled NLA positions in the villages of Slupčane, Orizari and Otlja. Afterwards, Macedonian police and infantry units advanced. On 7 May 2001, Macedonian Army officials announced that in the previous three days the Macedonian security forces had managed to destroy fourteen NLA entrenched positions, eight machine-gun bunkers, seven sniper nests, six control points, three arms storage facilities, and one mortar position. Army officials also stressed that during the operations only selected targets were being hit, to avoid civilian casualties and unnecessary material damage.

The most intensive clashes occurred during the first week of the offensive in Kumanovo on 8 May, at the entrance to the village of Slupčane. Army infantry launched an onslaught, causing insurgents to leave their positions and retreat towards Vaksince. Army helicopters then intercepted them with machine-gun fire. That same day, a position of twenty NLA insurgents was destroyed by the Macedonian Army in the "Mining colony" that was located close to Lojane.

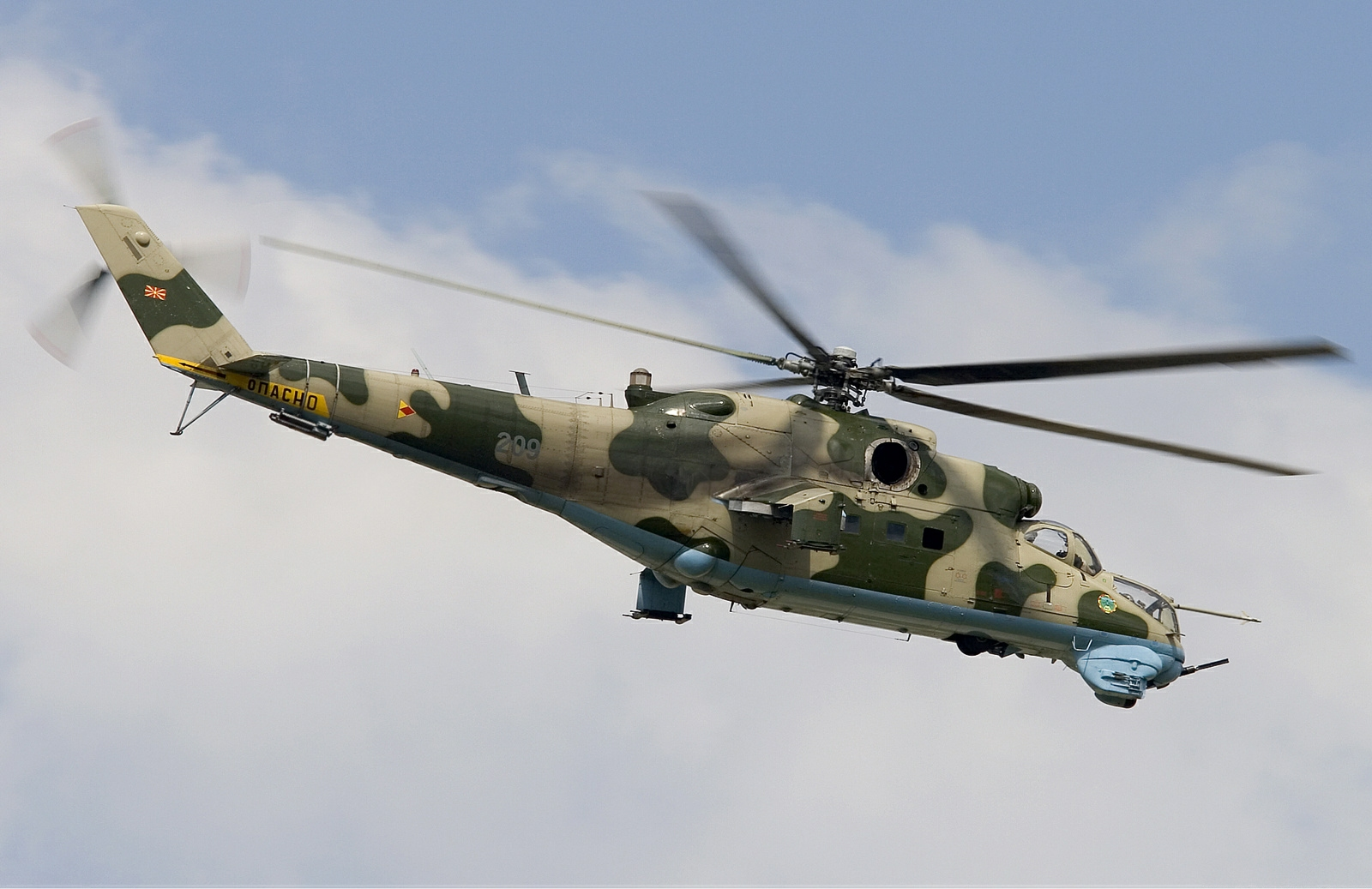
The Macedonian Army used Mi-24 helicopters.

On 24 May, Macedonian security forces launched the long-awaited general offensive against the NLA in the Kumanovo-Lipkovo region. Fighting continued into the next day and turned into urban warfare. The police and military infantry had to fight for every house in the large village of Vaksince, as the NLA resisted fiercely. Special units Tigers and Wolves, who specialised in urban counter-guerrilla fighting, were also deployed. After two weeks of heavy fighting, on 26 May, the Macedonian security forces recaptured Vaksince and Lojane. During the battle for Vaksince, Macedonian forces killed Fadil Nimani, chief commander of the NLA in Kumanovo.

Macedonian troops continued their offensive towards the NLA strongholds of Slupčane and Matejče, both about thirty kilometres northeast of the capital Skopje. On 29 May, Macedonian police and army units entered the village of Matejče. While searching the houses, they found weapons and military equipment, and also discovered a system of tunnels which provided connection between several houses. After the Macedonian security forces captured Matejče, the NLA initiated a coordinated attack on the village from the directions of Otlja, Orizare and Slupčane. The insurgents were firing machine-guns, automatic rifles, sniper rifles, and rocket propelled grenades".

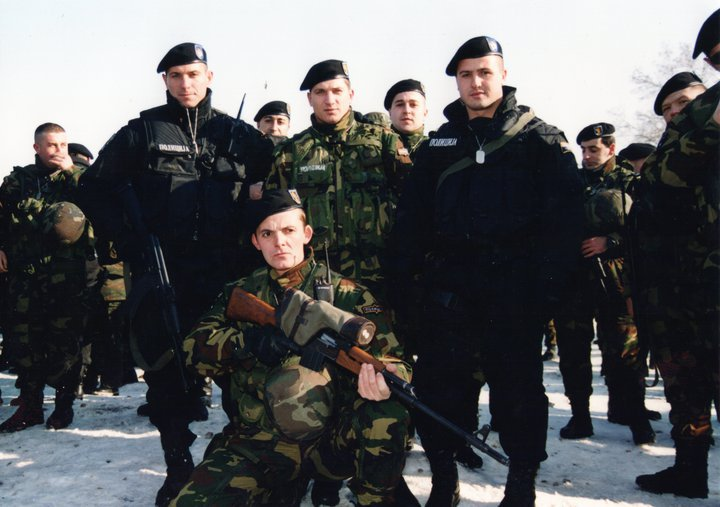
Macedonian police near Matejče in Kumanovo. Special police in black are members of the "Tiger" unit and the special police in green are members of the "Lions" unit.

At the beginning of June, the NLA closed the valves that were used for control of the outflow of water from the dam of the Lipkovo Lake. This stopped the supply of water for Kumanovo, causing a humanitarian crisis for the civilian population in the city. The people of Kumanovo had to be supplied with water from tanker trucks from Macedonia and Bulgaria. The International Red Cross mediated between the Macedonian authorities and the rebels to resolve this crisis, with little success. The army attempted to take over the Lipkovo dam.

Unlike Vaksince, Matejče and other villages on the battleground, Lipkovo still had 10,000 people who were not evacuated by the government or the Red Cross. To prevent civilian casualties, government representatives ordered the civilians in Lipkovo to evacuate the village. However, this order was not followed since the NLA insurgents in the village would not allow the International Red Cross to evacuate the civilians. The Mayor of Lipkovo, Husamedin Halili, issued an order opposite to the government's. He told civilians that they would be safer in the basements of their houses rather than attempt to leave the village because they would find themselves in the cross-fire between the security forces and the NLA.

To prevent a humanitarian catastrophe in Kumanovo by resuming the supply of water to the city, a temporary ceasefire was brokered, and President Trajkovski ordered a halt to the offensive on 11 June. Macedonian forces ceased all operations in the Kumanovo-Lipkovo region to allow international officials to inspect the water pumps. The temporary cease-fire was violated by the NLA only hours after the agreement, when insurgents shot at a police vehicle near Tetovo. During the exchange, which lasted until dawn, nine police officers were wounded, two seriously. The NLA apologized for the attack, describing it as a "mistake". During the ceasefire, the NLA also set fire to a historic Eastern Orthodox church in Matejce, considered one of the most important cultural monuments in Kumanovo, as well as to houses of ethnic Macedonian civilians. On 18 June, after a period of five days marked by negotiations and discussions, the NLA militants permitted a convoy led by OSCE representatives, which included expert teams from a water supply company, to enter Lipkovo. During the ceasefire, the supply of drinking water for Kumanovo would be turned on again, and ethnic Albanian civilians in the area of Kumanovo would receive food, water and medicine from the OSCE.

According to Macedonian official claims, security forces killed at least 30 NLA insurgents. On 23 July, NLA commemorated 16 killed rebels in Matejče. The fighting around Kumanovo effectively ended in a victory for the NLA. For Western observers, this meant that Macedonian security forces did not have the military ability to defeat the rebels, who remained in the villages of Vaksince, Slupčane and Lipkovo.

== Aračinovo crisis ==
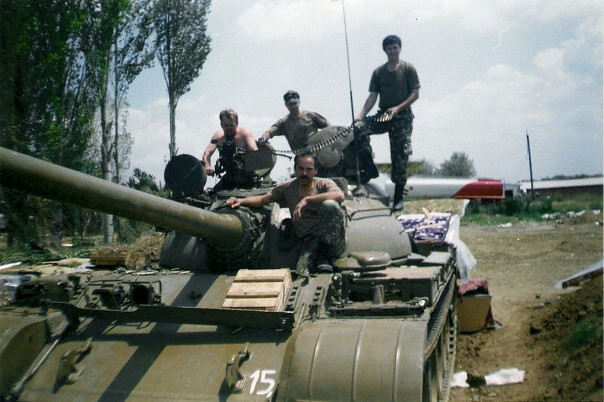
Macedonian T-55 tank and crew in Aračinovo.

The Macedonian offensive in Kumanovo came to a temporary standstill, because a new front was opened by the NLA which pulled attention away from Kumanovo. On 12 June 2001, insurgents who had previously infiltrated the area declared a "free territory" in Aračinovo, a village geographically located only a few kilometers north of Skopje. Through Aračinovo, which became one of the NLA 's headquarters, Albanian rebels threatened to shell Skopje with mortars, especially the parliament and government buildings. The commander-in-chief of Aračinovo was Hoxha or Xhezair Shaqiri.

On 22 June, Macedonian security forces launched a massive offensive to clear the ground of Albanian insurgents in the village. The next day, two Sukhoi Su-25 ground attack aircraft of the Macedonian military squadron, piloted by ARM pilots, carried out the first reconnaissance operations over the village. Macedonian forces advanced rapidly, surrounding the Albanian rebels from three sides. According to General Pande Petrovski, who commanded the Aračinovo operation, the ARM had at its disposal about 20,000 soldiers with armored battalions, 54 tanks, 120–130 mortars, Mi-24 helicopters and a sufficient amount of ammunition to carry out a decisive operation and complete the disbandment of the NLA. The battle lasted only three days, and ended with two-thirds of the village under Macedonian control. Under NATO auspices, a ceasefire was agreed to evacuate NLA members from Aračinovo to Lipkovo.

Thus, about 350 insurgents were allowed to leave the village with their weapons, with the help of US troops serving in KFOR and NATO forces in Kosovo, the OSCE and the European Union Mission, which sparked controversy. The Macedonian side was ordered to withdraw. As a sign of this, that same night several thousand Macedonians gathered in front of the parliament in Skopje to protest, during which the building was occupied and the protest turned into mass riots.

== General Ceasefire Agreement ==
After mediating by OSCE and NATO and receiving increased pressure to halt hostilities, the Macedonian government agreed to NATO's request to sign an unconditional ceasefire. The ceasefire agreement was signed on 5 July 2001 by the President, by army general Pande Petrovski and by police general Risto Galevski from the Macedonian side, and by Peter Feith, a representative from NATO. NATO was the guarantor of the General Ceasefire and the same agreement was then signed with the NLA in Prizren.

The General Ceasefire Agreement required a de-militarized zone be established extending between the border with Kosovo to the southern side of the Tetovo – Jažince highway. In accordance with the agreement, the Macedonian army retreated from Tetovo, and from all of the villages that were under its control in the conflict zone, and took up new positions on the Kosovo border, and south of Tetovo. Some reinforcements were also sent to the army positions on Popova Shapka. After the relocation of the army to the new positions south of the town, there were only four police checkpoints and the police units located in the building of the SVR left in Tetovo. Police units were also removed from the villages of the conflict zone. Police remaining in the region around Tetovo after the signing of the Ceasefire were as follows: twenty in Lesok, seventy in Tearce, one hundred and twenty in Vratnica, twenty-five in Jažince, one hundred in Jegunovce, fifty in Ratae, seventy in Selce, as well as five police checkpoints with fifteen policemen each.

According to the ceasefire agreement, Macedonian security forces could open fire only when their lives were directly threatened and the return of fire had to be proportionate to any attacks by the NLA.

Area affected during the conflict.

The agreement also envisioned a 3,000 strong NATO contingent to be deployed in the conflict zone after a political settlement was agreed between the Macedonian and Albanian political leaders. The mandate of the NATO force was to last forty-five days and the task was to disarm the NLA insurgents.

== Events after the General Ceasefire ==
The General Ceasefire Agreement, signed on 5 July 2001, was not respected by the NLA, which proceeded to violate it constantly. According to Macedonian army records, between the signing of the General Ceasefire on 5 July until the end of August, the NLA executed one hundred and thirty-nine direct attacks against Macedonian security forces: one hundred and seventeen in Tetovo, twelve in Kumanovo and ten in the Skopje region. The Macedonian security forces returned fire seventy-four times: sixty times in Tetovo, seven in Kumanovo and seven times in the Skopje region. There were eighty-one cases of the NLA kidnapping ethnic Macedonian civilians, with sixty-one of them being released.

=== New clashes in Tetovo ===
After the signing of the ceasefire agreement, and the removal of the army from the villages north of Tetovo, NATO gave guarantees to civilians who had fled the area for Kosovo, or were internally displaced, to return to their homes. Subsequently, ethnic Albanian civilians began to return to their homes in the Tetovo villages of Selce, Lavce, Gjermo, Šipkovica, Brodec, Vešala and Vejce. The return of the civilians, and the departure of the army, created favourable conditions for the NLA to reappear in these villages. Army observation positions spotted insurgents digging defensive positions around these villages, but the soldiers were not given permission to open fire.

The first major incident caused by the NLA was an artillery attack on Tetovo on 7 July 2001, only two days after the signing of the ceasefire. From their positions north of Tetovo, NLA insurgents began an artillery bombardment of the city. Mortar grenades were launched on the northern part of the city, towards the city stadium, and the central shopping mall "Tetovčanka". Insurgents continued firing on police checkpoints in the city with RPG launchers and automatic weapons from the direction of the villages of Gjermo and Poroj. The Macedonian police, stationed in the city, answered this fire with all of their available weapons. At the same time there were attempts by the insurgents to bomb the police station in Tearce.

During the weekend, the NLA entered the ethnic Macedonian villages of Brezno and Varvara and started digging in positions. Insurgents also started digging in above the big ethnic Macedonian village of Lesok. The Ministry of the Interior recorded the movements but did not intervene. But it warned the EU and OSCE monitors to take countermeasures. From their positions in Varvara, the insurgents opened fire with automatic weapons on Lesok and on the police positions at Jažince. During these incidents the police did not react, respecting the Ceasefire agreement. There were also sightings of the NLA establishing checkpoints on roads to the east of Tetovo.

On 9 July, it was announced in the media that when the insurgents first started shooting towards Lesok, a police unit came to the villagers and armed them with firearms and ammunition to defend themselves, because the police were not allowed to intervene. The armed villagers organised a village militia, took up defensive positions, and repelled the NLA's attempts to enter the village for two days. On the same day, groups of Tetovo Macedonians went to see the President to demand that the army be ordered to enter Tetovo and expel the insurgents from the ethnic Macedonian villages of Setole, Otunje, Jadoarce, Brezno, Varvara and Jelošnik so that civilians could be returned to their homes. They claimed that the NLA attacked the remaining Macedonian villages in the region to ethnically cleanse the region of Macedonians. They also stated that they thought that the General Ceasefire Agreement was "an unthought-of act which may, and already is, very harmful to the Macedonian population in the Tetovo region".

Toward the middle of July, the NLA entered the Tetovo suburb of Drenovec, which was already emptied of army and police personnel. Armed citizens organized control points in the suburb and started building positions in close proximity to former police positions at the stadium. Because of the fact the NLA used the Ceasefire to infiltrate Tetovo and come in close to the security forces' positions, General Pande Petrovski issued an order allowing the security forces to open fire if the insurgents came within 200 meters of their positions.

On 21 July, Macedonian army radar detected a NATO Chinook helicopter entering Macedonian air space from Kosovo and dropping a container on the village of Šipkovica (which after 5 July had fallen into NLA hands). Fifteen minutes after the first drop-off, another NATO helicopter dropped another container in the area of the village of Brodec. After dropping the cargo, the helicopters returned towards Kosovo. Macedonian air defence did not open fire on the helicopters, but the Macedonian Ministry of Defence demanded an official answer from KFOR about the two incidents. NATO officials initially denied any involvement, but later confirmed that they dropped the containers but stated that the cargo was not designated for the NLA, but for use by KFOR.

On 22 July, NLA insurgent positions in the villages north of Tetovo, as well as in the Drenovec suburb, started a massive onslaught against the Macedonian police near the villages as well as inside Tetovo. The attacks started at 11:00 with an attack on the police positions at the city stadium, Drenovec 2, and the army barracks on the outskirts of the city. The police answered fire leading to an outburst of heavy fighting. Fighting continued uninterrupted for a second day, and the insurgents moved slowly toward the city stadium, and Drenovec 2 suburb, and approached the city centre. On the same day the Defence Minister warned the NLA to withdraw from ground it had taken during the truce or face an all-out attack.

On the third day, the NLA seized control of the soccer stadium and the fighting spread toward the army positions on the Kosovo border. This triggered the army to intervene. On 24 July, the army started an attack on the NLA by shelling villages from which the rebels had advanced, in the mountains above Tetovo. Fighting also continued towards the Kosovo border. Army Suhoi fighter planes were also sent on a reconnaissance mission over NLA positions. At noon, backed by army artillery, police units attacked NLA positions in Drenovec 2 and the Tetovo teqe, starting the most serious of the clashes in Tetovo. In the attack the Macedonian police destroyed several insurgent positions in Drenovec 2, Strmno and Poroj, pushing the NLA away from the centre. During the battle for Drenovec 2, a police bullet seriously wounded the NLA commander who was in charge of the attack on Tetovo – the Kosovar Rahim Beqiri, also known as Komandant Roki. He was transported immediately to the Pristina hospital, where he died one week later.

The battle ended on 24 July 2001 after a night of fighting. The next day Tetovo was quiet while ethnic Albanian insurgents built up defences with sandbags. Across the graveyard Macedonian security forces were stationing armoured personnel carriers. After the battle there was a line dividing Tetovo with the city stadium being the"border". Although there were individual armed provocations until the end of 2001, the positions held by both sides inside the city of Tetovo, after the battle of 24 July, did not change. The biggest incident after the clashes on 24 July, happened on 7 August when the NLA made another attempt to take control of the city. The attack failed when the special units of the police launched a counter-strike and forced the insurgents back to their former positions.

During the July clashes in Tetovo, five members of the Macedonian security forces lost their lives. NLA sources confirm the death of Komandant Roki.

=== Karpalak and the "Tetovo-Jažince" operation ===
Toward the end of July and the beginning of August, NLA increased its presence in the demilitarised area around the Tetovo-Jažince highway, after ethnically cleansing five ethnic Macedonian villages located next to the highway. The Minister of the Interior and the Prime Minister were putting pressure on the President to order a full-scale offensive by the army to retake the territory which NLA occupied during the Ceasefire period after 5 July. This territory included most of the villages north of Tetovo, the Tetovo suburb of Drenovec, as well as an area north of the Tetovo-Jažince highway. The Prime Minister was continuing to push for a state of war to be declared to give the army the necessary freedom to resolve the crisis by military means. General Pande Petrovski prepared the plan of the offensive named "Operation Polog", but President Trajkovski refused to sign it. According to Petrovski, Trajkovski was constantly being assured by NATO and US envoys that the NLA would retreat peacefully from the area once the political dialog with the Albanian political parties intensified.

At the beginning of August 2001, Macedonian Intelligence Service received information that a special unit of the NLA had infiltrated the suburb of Čair in Skopje. The ten member group was led by the Albanian national Lefter Bicaj (known as Komandant Telli), and, according to the intelligence information, the group was tasked with organising terrorist attacks within the capitol. On 7 August, police discovered the group's hiding place and conducted a raid during which five members of the NLA group were killed and five others arrested. In the apartment police found a great number of: automatic rifles, handguns, mortars, explosive devices and grenade launchers.

The next day, on the way to Tetovo, a military convoy sending reinforcements to army positions around Tetovo, was attacked in an ambush set by NLA insurgents. Ten Macedonian soldiers lost their lives in the attack. They were attacked on the Tetovo-Jažince highway next to the Karpalak locale.

On 9 August, thirty NLA insurgents kidnapped five civil workers who were busy doing construction work on the Tetovo-Jažince highway. These people were brutally beaten and their skin was cut off with knives. When they were released, all of them were taken to intensive care.

On the same day, the President authorised a joint military-police action aimed at liberating and securing the Tetovo-Jažince area, which was demilitarised after the Ceasefire Agreement of 5 July. The operation started early on 10 August, and after several clashes with the insurgents, the Tetovo-Jažince area was retaken from the NLA and security check-points were established. The Tetovo-Skopje highway was also completely secured and the de-mining teams cleared the area of landmines while a strong police presence secured the road from diversions.

=== Battle at Raduša ===
The battle at Raduša was the worst violation of the General Ceasefire Agreement signed between the Republic of Macedonia and NATO (in the role of a guarantor for the NLA). The battle consisted of a series of clashes between the Macedonian security forces and the NLA insurgents in the area around the village of Raduša, near the border with Kosovo. The first incidents began near the end of June and escalated in the middle of August 2001.

The first clash took place on 20 June 2001, when four policemen from the Raduša police station discovered an NLA camp of forty insurgents on the steps of Žeden mountain, during a patrol of the terrain on the border. The police patrol opened fire killing one insurgent and wounding another. The patrol called on air support which came immediately and pushed the insurgents towards Kosovo.

On 23 July, one of the most dramatic single events in the conflict occurred when another police border patrol was attacked in an NLA ambush near Raduša. The police patrol was led by Aco Stojanovski, the Deputy-Commander of the Raduša police station. The insurgents fired at the police vehicle with RPG rockets, throwing three policemen out of the car and leaving one inside. The NLA attempted to approach the badly wounded policemen. Commander Stojanovski's firing six rounds from an AK-47 at the insurgents saved them until soldiers from the Raduša border post arrived and repelled the NLA with fire from an armored personnel carrier. After the conflict, commander Stojanovski became the president of the Union of Army and Police veterans of the Conflict in Macedonia. In the early hours of 10 August 2001, the NLA launched an offensive from the area of Krivenik in the Kosovo Municipality of Đeneral Janković (Hani i Elezit), invading the territory of Macedonia in the region of Raduša. The offensive took place during the ceasefire period, only days before the signing of the Ohrid Framework Agreement. The first actions began at 20:00 the same day with a mortar attack on the Raduša police station, located at the entrance of the village. The police station was manned by only thirty-five policemen. The security forces returned fire and the shootout lasted until 2:00 am. Afterwards, the NLA initiated an infantry attack which was repelled by the police. During the attack one police officer was injured.

According to information obtained by the Macedonian intelligence service, the attack was conducted by more than six hundred NLA insurgents, supported by volunteers from the Kosovo Protection Corps. The Corps came from the town of Krivenik in Kosovo and crossed the Macedonian border into Raduša during the night. According to the same information, the NLA plan of action was to neutralise the security forces in the Raduša sector, then penetrate southwards and capture the Rašče water spring which feeds the Macedonian capital Skopje with drinking water. Cutting water supplies would create a humanitarian crisis in the city.

The Ministry of Interior single-handedly declared an alert condition and sent detachments of the "Tiger" special police unit to dig in and secure the Rašče spring. Other detachments of the "Tiger" were sent to rescue thirty-five policemen surrounded at the Raduša station. Because of the lack of artillery support, and the overwhelming numbers of the NLA encirclement, they dug–in at positions outside Raduša. The Minister of Interior Ljube Boškoski and Prime Minister Ljubčo Georgievski asked President Trajkovski for an immediate activation of the army to neutralise the invasion from Kosovo. The president, however, encouraged by the NATO and EU envoys, was concentrated on reaching a political solution that respected the conditions of the 5 July Ceasefire Agreement. He asked that the police not respond to provocations to avoid an escalation of the conflict. Meanwhile, the encircled policemen in the Raduša station were left on their own.

In a letter to the UN secretary general Kofi Annan the Macedonian Prime Minister Ljupco Georgievski said:

Yesterday's and today's armed aggression from Kosovo by more than 600 members of the Kosovo Protection Corps against the territorial integrity of Macedonia, yesterday's siege of the village of Radusa and its bombardment by weapons stationed on the territory of Kosovo, for me personally, as a Prime Minister of the Republic of Macedonia, are nothing else but an official declaration of war against my country by an international protectorate, Kosovo, i.e. the Kosovo Protection Corps, which – unfortunately – is part of your civilian administration of the United Nations in Kosovo.

On 11 August, the second day of the battle, the NLA began the most serious attack against the security forces in the Skopje region. A column of two hundred Albanian insurgents attacked the Raduša army border post with mortar, automatic rifle and sniper fire. The Raduša army border post, located between the villages of Kučkovo and Raduša, was manned by twenty-five soldiers with mortars, automatic rifles, one tank, and three armoured personnel carriers. At the same time, the NLA conducted another assault attack on the encircled police station at the Raduša village. The army and police returned fire and, during the heavy fighting, the NLA managed to set fire to the petrol barrels within the barracks of the army border post. The insurgents managed to come so close that they started cutting the wire fence. The soldiers repelled all of the attacks on the army border post, and witnesses state that they could observe the insurgents carrying away the bodies of numerous dead and wounded. The policemen also managed to repel all of the attacks made on 11 August. Western media later showed images a Macedonian T-55 tank captured by the Albanian rebels in Raduša.

On the third day of the battles, 12 August, under great pressure to act by the Minister of Interior and the Prime Minister, the army decided to intervene in the battle. The army involved itself by sending military helicopters followed by two efficient flights by Macedonian Air Force Sukhoi Su-25s. The air bombardment, and the consequent approach of the army infantry and armed vehicles, put an end to the advances by the NLA, and brought a turnaround on the battlefield. NLA insurgents withdrew to their trenches and earth bunkers at their initial positions around the village of Raduša, or escaped to Kosovo. After breaking the encirclement, the army extracted the thirty-five policemen, with their equipment, and repositioned them in a more strategic position at the abandoned buildings on the Raduša mine road towards Skopje. One hundred and seventy policemen were added to reinforce this new position. The army also reinforced the already established positions for the defence of the Rašče water springs.

Although during the first two days of the battle there was a serious lack of coordination between the Macedonian military and police, the army was pressed to intervene to prevent the NLA from taking control of the whole territory around Raduša. Thus, the NLA failed to connect territories under its control in the Tetovo and Lipkovo regions, which would have created a single "liberated territory" in the north-west of Macedonia. On the other hand, the outcome of the battle further fuelled members of the Macedonian police force who were in favour of a military solution of the conflict. On 13 August Ljube Boskovski stated:

At this moment it is necessary to initiate the largest offensive so far, due to the danger that terrorists will widen the conflict.

The Macedonian security forces had a dozen men wounded in the battle but sustained no fatalities. Although Macedonian sources state that there were tens, if not hundreds of dead in the battle, Albanian sources do not give a precise number. However, at the location of the battle, there is a memorial stating "To the fallen NLA soldiers of 2001".

=== Ljuboten incident ===
On 10 August 2001, eight Macedonian soldiers were killed in a landmine explosion near the capital Skopje. The blast occurred on the road between the villages of Ljubanci and Ljuboten, five kilometres from the outskirts of Skopje, when a convoy of army trucks ran over three landmines. Another six soldiers were wounded in the explosion. According to CNN, two helicopter gunships were also called to shell the village, whose hundreds of residents were hiding in basements during an operation by the military in the village.

== Aftermath ==
=== Ohrid Framework agreement ===
The Ohrid Framework Agreement, which was signed on 13 August 2001, put an official end to the armed conflict. The agreement set the groundwork for increasing the rights of ethnic Albanians in Macedonia. The Agreement also included provisions for altering the official languages of the country, with any language spoken by over 20% of the population becoming co-official with the Macedonian language on the municipal level. Currently only Albanian, spoken by approximately 25% of the population, fulfils this criterion. According to the document, the version in English is the only authentic version of the Ohrid Framework Agreement.

The Agreement was preceded by the Ohrid discussions, a series of talks between Albanian and Macedonian representatives, along with representatives from the United States and European Union. The talks took place in Ohrid in the south-west of Macedonia. The agreement was negotiated by Zoran Jolevski, Secretary General of President Boris Trajkovski. The Macedonian side was represented by the VMRO-DPMNE and the SDSM, while the Albanian side was represented by the DPA and the PDP. Although actively participating in armed conflict, the National Liberation Army did not participate directly in the talks.

=== Ceasefire and disarmament ===
Under the Ohrid Agreement, the Macedonian government pledged to improve the rights of Albanians in the country. Those rights included making Albanian the second official language, and increasing the participation of ethnic Albanians in government institutions, the police, and the army. The Macedonian government agreed to a new model of decentralization. The Albanian side agreed to give up any separatist demands and to fully recognize all Macedonian institutions. In addition, according to this agreement, the NLA was to disarm and hand over its weapons to NATO.

Operation "Essential Harvest" was officially launched on 22 August and effectively started on 27 August. This 30-day mission involved approximately 3,500 NATO and Macedonian troops, whose objective was to disarm the NLA and to destroy their weapons. Before the ratification of the Ohrid Agreement, three Macedonian police officers were killed in an ambush by ethnic Albanian gunmen on 12 November 2001.

=== Casualties and displacement ===
Casualty figures remain uncertain. By 19 March 2001, the BBC reported that Macedonian security forces had claimed five of their soldiers were killed, while the NLA claimed that it had killed eleven. No definitive Albanian casualty figures were cited at the time. On 25 December 2001, the Alternative Information Network cited figures of sixty-three deaths claimed by Macedonian security forces for their side and sixty-four deaths claimed by the NLA for their insurgents. About sixty ethnic Albanian civilians are thought to have been killed while possibly ten ethnic Macedonians died during the conflict. Macedonian authorities did not release figures for the latter at the time. As of December 2005, the fate of twenty missing civilians, thirteen ethnic Macedonians, six ethnic Albanians and one Bulgarian citizen remains unknown. By August 2001, the number of people displaced by the war reached 170,000, mostly Macedonians. Of these 170,000, 74,000 were displaced internally. As of January 2004, 2,600 people remained displaced. Two European Union monitors were killed by the explosion of a mine during the conflict. One British soldier was also killed in the course of Operation Harvest when the armoured Land Rover he was driving was pelted with concrete lumps by a hostile crowd.

During Operation Essential Harvest the NLA was in possession of two tanks and 2 APCs which they claim were captured from the Macedonian army. According to Macedonian General Pande Petrovski one T-55 tank was destroyed by friendly fire in the village of Matejce and another got stuck in a small river was abandoned and disabled by the crew to prevent it being used which the NLA later found and presented as a war trophy.

=== NLA Freedom Museum ===
As a result of the conflict, some Albanians of the Čair Municipality in Skopje established a 'Museum of Freedom' in 2008, presenting what they consider the battles of the Albanians in the region from the period of the Prizren League in 1878 until the 2001 insurgency. It is also known as the NLA Museum and commemorates those who died during the conflict. Items include paramilitary clothing and insurgent flags used in 2001. Many Albanians see it as a non-military continuation of the uprising. Former NLA leader turned politician, Ali Ahmeti stated at the opening ceremony: "My heart tells me that history is being born right here, in Skopje, the ancient city in the heart of Dardania. Our patriots have fought for it for centuries, but it is us today who have the destiny to celebrate the opening of the museum. Fighters from Kosovo are here to congratulate us ..."

== Alleged and confirmed war crimes ==
In July 2001, the Chairman-in-Office of the OSCE, Mircea Geoana condemned the ethnic cleansing undertaken by Albanian insurgents.

In a three-day operation by Macedonian police against the ethnic Albanian village of Ljuboten, from 10 to 12 August 2001, ten civilians were killed and more than one hundred ethnic Albanian men were arrested, many of whom were severely beaten and tortured while in police custody. According to the Macedonian government, there was an insurgent presence in the village; however, a Human Rights Watch investigation on the ground in Ljuboten found no direct evidence of this. These events led to the trial of the then-Macedonian Minister of Internal Affairs, Ljube Boškoski, in the International War Crime Tribunal in The Hague. He was acquitted in 2008, but his co-defendant Johan Tarčulovski was found guilty for "planning and instigating the murder of three ethnic Albanian civilians, wanton destruction of twelve houses or other property and cruel treatment of thirteen ethnic Albanian civilians, all violations of the laws or customs of war"; both verdicts were upheld in 2010.

The NLA was involved in kidnappings and abuse of mostly Macedonian and Serbian civilians with one of these taking place in Mavrovo in August 2001 when the NLA kidnapped 5 Macedonian roadworkers, another time this happened was in Matejce when the NLA kidnapped and abused 8 ethnic Serbs, the NLA has been accused of many other war crimes in the conflict.

The bombing of the 13th-century Orthodox monastery Sveti Atanasij in the village of Lesok is considered a war crime by some. However, no one has ever claimed responsibility for the attack. Albanian guerrilla officials have dismissed all responsibility and placed the blame on Macedonian special forces, saying it was another poor attempt to link the NLA to terrorism. However, upon closer inspection, it was discovered that near the rubble that had once been one of the most revered religious sites for the Macedonian Orthodox Church, there lay a dead donkey, its bloated body daubed with red paint spelling out the letters UÇK, the Albanian abbreviation for the rebel National Liberation Army. Three uniformed NLA guerrillas in an observation post overlooking the monastery said they had logged the explosion at 3.10 am. They said they had not seen those responsible, but believed that they were Macedonians from the nearby Macedonian village of Ratae. This incident is disputed to this day and the monastery is now undergoing reconstruction. On the other hand, the Macedonian forces themselves destroyed a mosque in the village of Neprošteno. The mosque was rebuilt in 2003 with funding from the EU.

The monastery at Matejče, near Kumanovo, was also damaged in the fighting and the church of St. Virgin Hodegetria was vandalized by the Albanian insurgents.

The Macedonian government also claimed the Vejce ambush, in which Albanian insurgents ambushed and killed eight Macedonian soldiers, to be a war crime. According to these claims, soldiers captured by the insurgents were, executed, mutilated, and burned. The claims were not verified by international observers, and to this day, the bodies have not been released to the public or to civilian investigators and autopsies were carried out in a military morgue. However, news of the deaths sparked local riots against ethnic-Albanians in several towns and cities across Macedonia, and such revolts included burning and vandalizing shops and mosques.

== Foreign involvement ==
According to Anthony Tucker-Jones and Aristotle Tziampiris, about 150 Mujahideen fighters participated within the NLA, and played only a minor role. Rumors concerning Serbia's purported involvement in the crisis in Macedonia and the alleged presence of foreign Mujahideen fighters in the country spread widely.

During the conflict, various rumors arose of Al-Qaeda, Taliban and Mujahideen presence among the NLA, primarily from Macedonian media and the Macedonian government. Following the September 11 attacks against the United States, the Macedonian government repeatedly used anti-terrorist rhetoric and invented threats to score political points. After police shot and killed seven foreign men on the outskirts of Skopje in March, the government described the events as an attempted "terrorist attack" on Western embassies. The Ministry of the Interior attempted to link the killed foreigners with the NLA and Al-Qaeda, and described them as "mujahideen". Official versions of the incident were changed, and the ministry did not accept a request for international forensic analysis of the bodies. The Wall Street Journal eventually described the victims as Pakistani and Indian migrants going to Greece for employment reasons. The government continued, however, to label them "terrorists". According to Wim van Meurs, the allegations about a Mujahideen involvement were an attempt by Macedonian hardliners to lower Western resolve to implement the Ohrid Agreement and consolidate Macedonia as a multiethnic state. Per Aristotle Tziampiris, the NLA was similar to the Kosovo Liberation Army, having a nationalist irredentist ideology far removed from Islamic theology or agendas.

The conflict gave Russia an entry point in the region. Russia backed the most militant elements in the Macedonian government, and its claims that the Albanian side of the conflict was made up of Islamic fundamentalists and drug traffickers were supported by pro-Russia Macedonian politicians. Such claims were denied by Albanian politicians and guerrilla fighters, who were staunchly pro-American. Russia, as part of a disinformation campaign, blamed NATO for the conflict. This was mimicked by pro-Russia Macedonian politicians, including the Macedonian National Assembly speaker Stojan Andov who said that the West was using the Albanian rebels to weaken Russia's presence in the region. Although there were persistent reports about possible clandestine arms transfers from Russia during and after the insurgency, Russia reportedly was hesitant to provide specialized military equipment to Macedonia to not alienate the US and EU. On the other hand, Ukraine, which had close ties with Russia, provided Macedonia with arms and training. Bulgaria and Greece also announced that they were sending arms to the Macedonian government.

Macedonia received critical military assistance from Ukraine and Bulgaria. Ukraine served as the primary military equipment supplier under a bilateral agreement, providing Mi-24 attack helicopters, Su-25 ground-attack aircraft, tanks, and small arms despite diplomatic pressure from NATO and Western nations to suspend sales. Bulgaria provided initial heavy equipment, including T-55 tanks and armored vehicles. Conversely, NATO maintained an international mediating role, pressuring both sides into ceasefires, facilitating the Ohrid Framework Agreement, and launching Operation Essential Harvest to disarm NLA insurgents following the peace treaty.

== Bibliography ==
=== Macedonian authors ===
- Testimonies 2001 by General Pande Petrovski, Сведоштва 2001 од Генерал Панде Петровски (2006)
- Unfinished Peace by Jadranka Kostova, Незавршен мир од Јадранка Костова (2003)
- 2001: War with two faces by Mančo Mitevski, 2001: Војна со две лица од Манчо Митевски (2008)
- In focus of civil war in Macedonia by Jordan Jordanov, Во фокусот на граѓанската војна во Македонија од Јордан Јорданов (2003)
- Road of truth by Svetlana Antikj Jovčevska, Патот на вистината од Светлана Антиќ Јовчевска (2004)

==== Macedonian authors of Albanian descent ====
- Testimonies of the general by Gëzim Ostreni, Сведоштва на Генералот од Гзим Острени

=== Foreign authors ===
- Fires over Tetovo by Rišard Bilski, Пожари над Тетово од Ришард Билски (2003)
- NLA-message and hope by Petrit Menaj, ОНА порака и надеж од Петрит Менај (2008)

== See also ==
- 2012 Republic of Macedonia inter-ethnic violence
- Albanian nationalism in North Macedonia
- Operation Mountain Storm

== Sources ==
- Icevska, Gordana; Ajdini, Ilir (January 2004). "Same World, Parallel Universes The Role of the Media in the Macedonian Conflict". Conflict Studies Research Centre.
