= Jažince, Jegunovce =

Jažince Јажинце Jazhincë
- Village
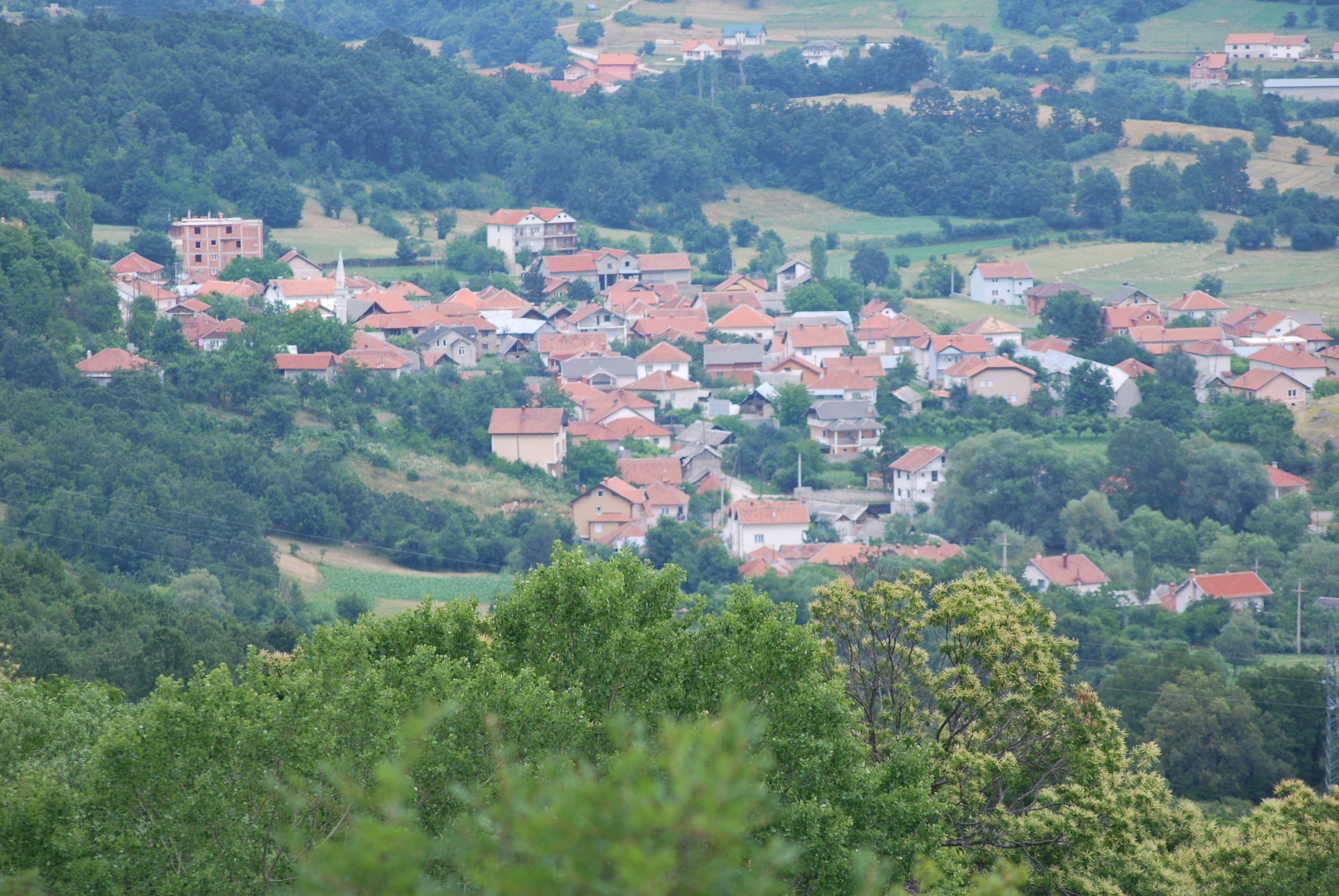

- Location within North Macedonia
- Coordinates: 42°10′N 21°11′E
- Country: North Macedonia
- Region: Polog
- Municipality: Jegunovce

Population (2021)
  - Total: 913
- Time zone: UTC+1 (CET)
  - Summer (DST): UTC+2 (CEST)
- Car plates: TE
- Website: .

Jažince (Macedonian: Јажинце, Albanian: Jazhincë) is a village in the municipality of Jegunovce, North Macedonia. It used to be part of the former municipality of Vratnica.

== History ==
Jažince is attested in the 1467/68 Ottoman tax registry (defter) for the Nahiyah of Kalkandelen. The village had a total of 26 Christian households and 2 bachelors.

According to the 1467-68 Ottoman defter, Jažince exhibits Slavic Orthodox anthroponomy.

== Demographics ==
According to the 2021 census, the village had a total of 913 inhabitants. Ethnic groups in the village include:

- Albanians 884
- Persons for whom data are taken from administrative sources 29

In statistics gathered by Vasil Kanchov in 1900, the village of Jažince was inhabited by 220 Muslim Albanians and 25 Orthodox Bulgarians.
