= Vratnica =

Vratnica Вратница
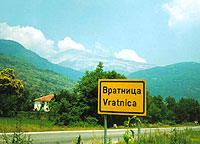
- Entrance in Vratnica from Tetovo. In the back of the photo is mountain peak Ljuboten (2498m) at Šar Planina

- Location within North Macedonia
- Coordinates: 42°8′26″N 21°6′51″E
- Country: North Macedonia
- Region: Polog
- Municipality: Jegunovce

Population
  - Total: 505
- Postal code: 1225
- Area code: 044
- Car plates: TE

Vratnica (Macedonian: Вратница) is a small village and community located in the Jegunovce Municipality of North Macedonia. Vratnica lies in the north-west, and is 22 km away from the city of Tetovo and 5 km away from Jažince - the border crossing point with Kosovo. Prior to 2003 Vratnica was the centre of the now disestablished Vratnica municipality.

It is situated in the upper part of the Polog plain, at the foothills of northern part of Šar Mountain, under the Ljuboten peak. The village lies at 700–760 meters above the sea level.

== History ==
Vratnica was mentioned for the first time in Ottoman defters (tax registry and land cadastre) dating back to the 15th century. It was recorded that there were about 59 families living in Vratnica. In the defter labeled 4 for the years 1467/68 the number of houses had increased to 66, while in 1545 there is a record of 76 houses, and in 1568 there were 84 houses registered.

The village underwent migrations and settlement until the 18th century, and in the 20th century, there was extensive chain migration to the United States. In 1914/1916, the total population of Vratnica was 1,131 with 131 houses; in 1948, there were 1,299 inhabitants and 197 houses; in 1953, there were 1,387 inhabitants and 214 houses; in 1961, the respective numbers were 1,384 and 227; in 1968, 1,240 and 225; and, in 1971, 1,082 inhabitants and 266 houses.

During the 2001 War between Albanian insurgents and the Macedonian state, Vratnica was besieged by the NLA. In 2005 Albanians opened fire on the local police station.

== Demographics ==
The vast majority of the inhabitants are ethnic Macedonians, but most of the older immigrants in the United States consider themselves to be Serbian.

In statistics gathered by Vasil Kanchov in 1900, the village of Vratnica was inhabited by 780 Christian Bulgarians.

In 1961, there were 1,384 inhabitants living in Vratnica. However, by 1994 the population had decreased to 572, of which 522 were Macedonians, 33 were Serbs, and 17 others.

According to the Macedonian census from 2002, the ethnic groups in the village were: 482 Macedonians; 20 Serbs and 3 others.

== Notable people ==
Notable people of Vratnican descent.

- Ane Mihailovich, footballer
- Sasho Cirovski, football coach
- Slavko Milosavlevski, sociologist

== Regular Events ==
- Traditional Mayday Tournament "VRATNICA" - (May 1). One of the biggest sport events in the Polog region. The tournament includes football and streetball (basketball) competition. In the past handball was also played.
