= Korab Falls =

Waterfall on Mount Korab, North Macedonia

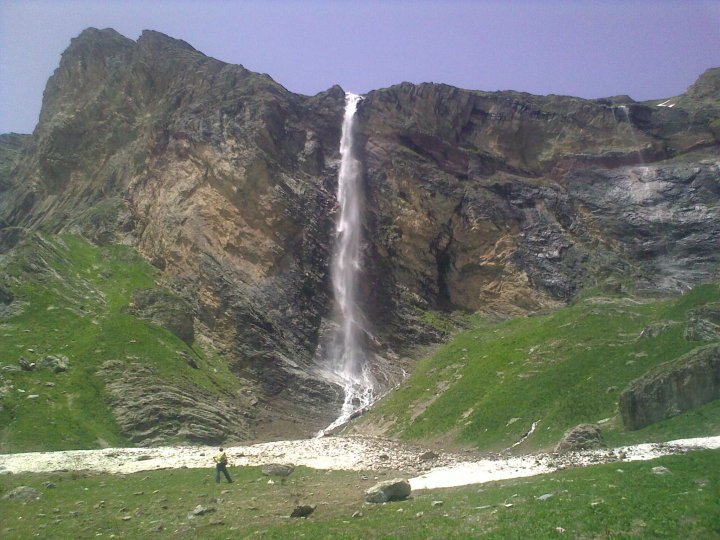
- Korab Falls
- Interactive map of Korab Falls
- Location: Mount Korab, North Macedonia
- Coordinates: 41°45′47.22″N 20°32′15.24″E

Korab Falls (Macedonian: Корапски Водопад, also known as Proifel Falls; Macedonian: Пројфелски Водопад; Albanian: Ujëvara e Korabit) is a waterfall in the upper course of the Dlaboka River on Mount Korab, North Macedonia. It forms in springtime from the melting snow on the east side of Mal Korab peak. The waterfall differs in height and intensity, depending on the season. It is the highest waterfall in North Macedonia and one of the highest in the Balkan Peninsula.

There are different sources about the height of the waterfall, and the calculated drop varies from 100 to 138 m (328 to 453 ft). The exact height may differ in different points that are taken as its top and bottom, at different measurements. The upper point is at approximately 2,120 metres (6,960 ft) above sea level, and the lower is at around 1,990 metres (6,530 ft).

The highest water levels are in late May and early June, and afterwards the level drops throughout the summer. During very dry summers, the waterfall may dry out in late August and September.

The best track route to the waterfall is the one that leads through the river canyon. It can be accessed both from the left bank of the river through the villages of Nistrovo and Žužnje, or from the right bank from Bibaj, beneath Kabash Peak. The routes are poorly marked, covered with overgrowth, and there are several unsecured river crossings.

== See also ==
- List of waterfalls
