= Dlaboka River =

River in North Macedonia

- Длабока Река; Përroi i Thellë
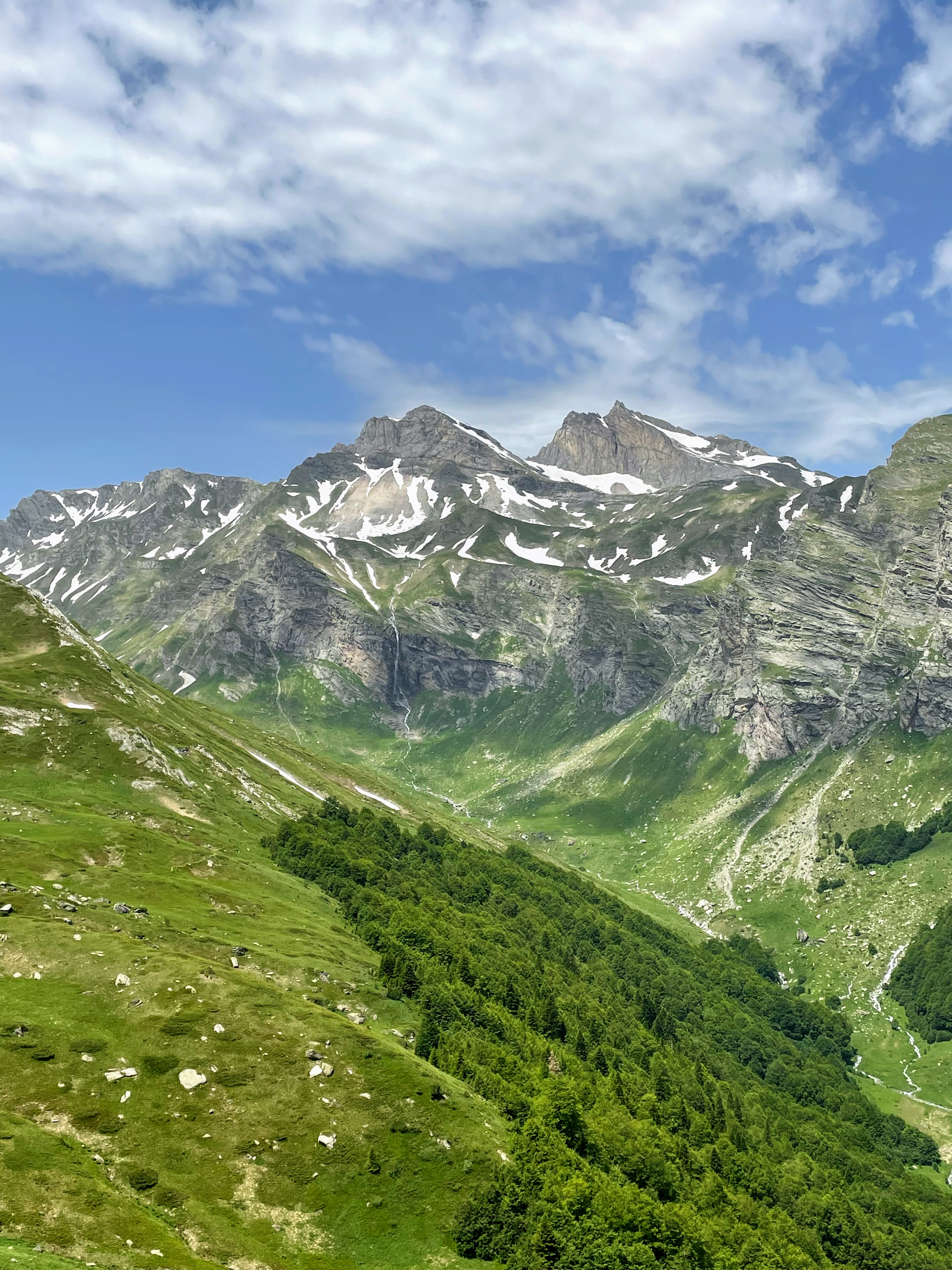

- Location within North Macedonia Location within Europe
- Location: Mavrovo and Rostuša Municipality
- Nearest town: Gostivar, Debar
- Coordinates: 41°45′47.22″N 20°32′15.24″E
- Designated: 19 April 1949
- Governing body: Mavrovo National Park

UNESCO World Heritage Site
- Official name: Primeval Beech Forests of the Carpathians
- Type: Natural
- Criteria: ix
- Designated: 31 July 2021

Dlaboka River (Macedonian: Длабока река, Dlaboka Reka; Albanian: Përroi i Thellë), literally meaning Deep River, is a river in western North Macedonia located in the Upper Reka region. It is a left tributary to Ribnička river, which is one of the largest tributaries of Radika river. Its source is high on Mount Korab, forming a steep valley which is one of the few places with alpine climate in North Macedonia.

The famous Korab waterfall is located near the source of the river. The river flows by the abandoned village of Žužnje, then into the canyon beneath the villages Nistrovo and Bibaj, and then empties into the Ribnička river.

The upper course of the river flows through a typical glacial U-shaped valley. The valley narrows at the lower part and forms a canyon.

Valley of Dlaboka River was designated as UNESCO natural heritage site on 44. session of UNESCO in July 2021, included in Ancient and Primeval Beech Forests of the Carpathians and Other Regions of Europe.
