= Upper Reka Albanian dialect =

Albanian Gheg dialect

Upper Reka
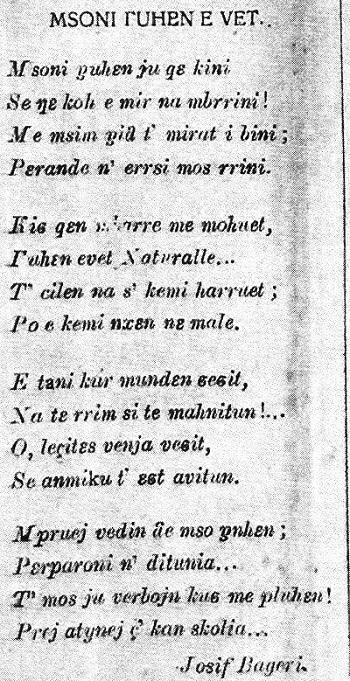
- Mesoni guhen e vet (Learn your language). Poem by Josif Bageri, a native of Upper Reka, 1909
- Native to: North Macedonia
- Region: Upper Reka
- Ethnicity: Macedonian Albanians
- Language family: Indo-European: Albanoid; Albanian; Gheg; Southern?; Central; Upper Reka
- Writing system: Latin (Albanian alphabet)

Language codes
- ISO 639-3: –
- Glottolog: None
- IETF: aln-MK
- Map of Upper Reka

The Upper Reka dialect is a member of the wider northern Gheg subgroup of the Albanian language spoken by northern Albanians. Speakers of the dialect are mainly located within the territory of the sub-region of Upper Reka in north-western North Macedonia. Due to the geographical isolation of the Upper Reka region, the Upper Reka dialect also developed linguistic peculiarities that differentiate it from other varieties of Albanian. Within the Gheg dialects, the Upper Reka dialect is classified as a Central Gheg dialect, along with the dialects of the Kruja, Mati and Dibra regions.

== Linguistic characteristics ==
=== Phonology ===
The Upper Reka dialect contains phonological and morphological characteristics that are unique of speakers in Albanian within Upper Reka. For example, the Albanian letter q (in Standard Albanian, /c/) often voiced as a hard ç (/t͡ʃ/) sound in some Northern dialects is articulated as a soft ç sound in Upper Reka. Unlike Northern Albanian dialects, which mainly pronounce the Albanian characters gj(/ɟ/) as a hard xh(/d͡ʒ/) sound, in Upper Reka it is at times rendered as a soft gj(/ɟ/) sound, reminiscent of some Southern Albanian dialects. The cluster dj (/dj/) as in the word djathë (cheese) are also substituted for a gj sound (i.e. *gjathë) in certain instances. The consonant cluster pl as in plak (old), pleh (manure) and plis (pileus) of the Reka dialect has been replaced in certain instances with pt causing words to be pronounced as ptak, pteh and ptis. The sound cluster ps word internally like tepsi ("large baking pan/tray") is in the Upper Reka dialect partially nasalized into mts making words to be pronounced for example as temtsi.

Unlike in some Albanian dialects (typically Northern), where the sound cluster nd has contracted into n, in Upper Reka it is maintained in words like katund (spread out village), nder (honour) and vend (place). Like most Gheg dialects, the Upper Reka dialect has also retained the nasal vocalisation of vowels ā (often a schwa: ë /ə/ in Standard Albanian) and ō, so that words like dhëmb (tooth), dhëndër (groom) and këmb (foot) are pronounced as dhāmb, dhōndr and kōmb. The sound a (often a schwa: ë in Standard Albanian) in words like baballak is also substituted at times for o (i.e. baballoku) when in definite form. The sound cluster mj in words like mjeker (beard) and mjalt (honey) has evolved into a mnj sound in Upper Reka, causing articulations of mnjekrr and mnjalt. Also the h sound which in most Albanian dialects is pronounced as a glottal fricative, is realized as a guttural "hard" h in Upper Reka.

Kinship Terminology
English	Standard Macedonian	Standard Albanian	Upper Reka Albanian (Doda, 1900s)	Upper Reka Albanian (Mirčevska, 2000s)
Mother	Majka	Nënë	Non (definite: Nona), Uc	Daad
Father	Tatko	Babë	Baba	Baab
Sister	Sestra	Motër	Motr	(referred to by individual's name)
Brother	Brat	Vëlla	Vlla	Vlla (usage: O, Vlla)
Grandmother	Baba	Gjyshe (also: Nënëgjyshe)	Nana Ptak	None
Grandfather	Dedo	Gjysh (also: Babagjysh)	Baba Ptak	Ded
Aunty (Mother's sister)	Tetka	Teze (also: Teto, Motërmëmë)	Kek	Kek (usage: O, Kek)
Aunt's husband (Mother's side)	Tetin	Enishte	/	Tetin (usage: O, Tetin)
Uncle (Father's brother)	Čičko	Xhaxha (also: Xha)	Mixh (definite: Mixha)	Miiç (usage: O, mixha Metodi)
Uncle's wife (Father's side)	Strina	Xhaxheshë	Minxhavic	Striin (usage: O, Striin)
Uncle (Mother's brother)	Vujko	Dajë	Dajxh (definite: Dajxha)	Dajxh (usage: O, Dajxh)
Uncle's wife (Mother's side)	Vujna	Dajeshë	Dajxhevic	Dajxhevic (usage: O, Dajxhevic)
Husband's sister (Sister-in-law)	Zolva	?	/	Zolva (usage: Zolva jeme)
Brother-in-law	Dever	Kunat	Kunat	Kunati
Sister-in-law	Jatrva	Kunatë	/	Kunata
Wife's sister's husband	Badžanak	Baxhanak	/	Baxhanak
Wife's brother, (Brother-in-law)	Šura	?	/	Shuraku
Cousin	Bratučedi	Kushëri	Kusheri (definite: Kusherini)	Kusheriin
Father in Law	Dedo	Vjehërri	/	Ded (usage: O, Ded)
Godparents	Kumovi	Kumbarë (also: Nun and Nunëri)	/	Nun
In law (male)	Svat	Krushk	Krushk	Krushk
In law (female)	Svaća	Krushkë	/	Kruushk

=== Morphology and Syntax ===
The Upper Reka dialect uses do to create its future tense, as do most Tosk dialects as well as certain other Gheg dialects, including all of Southern Gheg (i.e. Tirana and Elbasan dialects), the Northwestern Gheg dialect of Shkreli, the Northeastern Gheg dialects of the Has and Luma regions, and the Northern Gheg of Mirdita.

== Education and Literature ==
The earliest known example of the Upper Reka dialect being employed in writing is from an Orthodox graveyard headstone inscription written in Cyrillic script at Duf which dates from 1889. While an ethnographic work by Bajazid Elmaz Doda from Štirovica titled Albanisches Bauerleben im oberen Rekatal bei Dibra (Makedonien)/Albanian Peasant Life in the Upper Reka Valley near Dibra (Macedonia) was completed in 1914. It contains information about culture, customs, language and other facets of life of Upper Reka during the late Ottoman period. Found within the Austrian archives in 2007, Robert Elsie postulates that the original script may have been translated into German from Albanian due to the amount of Albanian vocabulary contained in the German version. Elsie contends that the work was the first to employ the Upper Reka dialect in literature and composed at a time when little Albanian literature had been produced. The work has been praised by Elsie and other scholars like Andrea Pieroni for its detailed and important information of Upper Reka. The first attested example of Albanian literature being present in Upper Reka is a 19th-century Albanian language gospel text (New Testament) written in the Greek alphabet held in a church in the village of Duf. During the monarchist Yugoslav era, schooling was done in the Serbian language and none existed in Albanian.

== Language usage ==
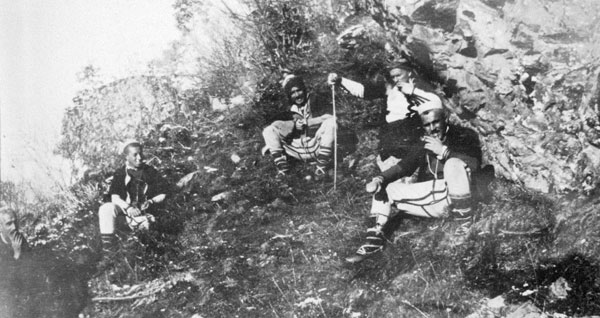
Men of Štirovica conversing on a hillside, 1907

Starting in the 1950s, Albanians in Upper Reka were forced to send their children to schooling in Macedonian, with the goal of assimilating them. It was reported that during that period, many Albanian children cried when they came home from school and tried to refuse to attend, because they didn't understand the language.

Most Upper Reka inhabitants do not have complete command of higher registers of the Albanian language, as higher level Albanian vocabulary remains unknown to them. Instead, Macedonian words are used, especially for modern household items or designating certain modern concepts.

In the 2000s, there are elderly Upper Reka women who still have some knowledge of Serbian, though not of Macedonian. Muslim Albanians residing in Upper Reka in the 2010s are to varying degrees also bilingual in Macedonian. Of the Orthodox population residing in Upper Reka in the 2000s, in terms of daily speech were mainly fluent in Albanian among themselves and even the young. Reading and writing in Macedonian is known by the population, with the young making use of it, while literacy skills in Albanian by all age groups are non-existent. Most of the Orthodox population from Upper Reka living outside the region is knowledgeable in Albanian such as in areas of the Former Yugoslavia. Very few of them reveal that information though, due to negative perceptions of the Albanian language within host societies where they currently reside and their integration into Macedonian society through sharing a common Orthodox Christian heritage. Among the wider Macedonian population, there is little awareness of the existence of an Orthodox Christian population which uses Albanian as a language of everyday communication. Due to the legacy of seasonal migration for work, trade and emigration, Upper Reka people have become multilingual over time in various languages including Turkish, Greek, Serbian, Bulgarian, Romanian, French and English.

== See also ==
- Culture of Upper Reka
- Albanian dialects
- Reka dialect - Macedonian dialect of Lower Reka
