= Albanian dialects =

Overview of dialects of Albanian

The various dialects of the Albanian language in Albania, Greece, Italy, Kosovo, Macedonia, Montenegro and Serbia. (Note: The map does not imply that the Albanian language is the majority or the only spoken language in these areas.)

The Albanian language is composed of many dialects, divided into two major groups: Gheg and Tosk. The Shkumbin river is roughly the geographical dividing line, with Gheg spoken north of the Shkumbin and Tosk south of it.

== Historical considerations ==
The characteristics of the Albanian dialects Tosk and Gheg, in the treatment of the native and loanwords from other languages, have led to the conclusion that the dialectal split preceded the Slavic migration to the Balkans.

According to the view of Demiraj, during the process of dialect split Albanian populations were roughly in their present location, while Eric Hamp notes that "it must be relatively old, that is, dating back into the post-Roman first millennium. As a guess, it seems possible that this isogloss reflects a spread of the speech area, after the settlement of the Albanians in roughly their present location, so that the speech area straddled the Jireček Line".

== Gheg dialects ==
Gheg is divided into four sub-dialects: Northwest Gheg, Northeast Gheg, Central Gheg, and Southern Gheg. Northwest Gheg is spoken throughout Montenegro, northwestern Kosovo (west of Pejë), Lezhë, northwestern Mirditë, southwestern Tropojë, western Gusinje, western Pukë, and Shkodër. Northeast Gheg is spoken throughout most of Kosovo, Preshevë, Has, northeastern Mirditë, eastern parts of villages of Shalë commune of Shkodër, eastern parts of villages of other communes of Shkodër bordered with Tropojë, eastern Pukë, eastern Gjakovë, eastern Gusinje, Kukës, Tropojë, and northern Tetovë. Central Gheg is spoken in Debar, Gostivar, Krujë, northern Durrës, northern Tirana, Peshkopi, southern Lezhë, southern Mirditë, Mat, Bulqizë, eastern Strugë, Kumanovo, and southern Tetovë. Southern Gheg is spoken in Durrës, northern Elbasan, northern Pogradec, Librazhd, northern Peqin, southern Bulqizë, Kavajë, Rrogozhinë, northwest Strugë, and Tirana. One fairly divergent dialect is the Upper Reka dialect, which is however classified as Central Gheg. There is also a diaspora dialect in Croatia, the Arbanasi dialect. Additionally, Istrian Albanian, spoken in parts of Istria until the late 19th century, was a Northwestern Gheg dialect.

=== Gheg features ===
- No rhotacism: Proto-Albanian *-n- remains -n- (e.g. râna "sand").
- Proto-Albanian *ō becomes vo.
- Nasal vowels: Gheg retains the nasal vowels of late Proto-Albanian and the late Proto-Albanian *â plus a nasal remains â (e.g. nândë "nine"). Although, the quality of the vowel varies by dialect, [ɑ̃], [ɒ̃], [ɔ̃], etc. Some Northeast and Northwest Gheg dialects preserve the nasal in words such as [pɛ̃s] "five" while other Gheg dialects do not, [pɛs] "five".
- Monophthongization: Occurs in some dialects of Shkodër in a few words, e.g. [vø̞ː] voe "egg" and [hɛ̞ː] hae "food".
- Phonological vowel length: There is often phonological vowel length in most Gheg dialects. Some dialects of Shkodër have a three length distinction in vowels, for example, short: [pɛ̃nˠ] "yoke", long: [pɛ̃ːnˠ] "pen", and extra-long: [pɛ̃ːːnˠ] "yokes".
- a-vowel: In some dialects occurring in some certain words a may become a diphthong (e.g. [bəaɫ] for ballë "forehead") or become [æ] (e.g. [læɾɡ] for larg "far").
- ë-vowel: Final -ë drops and often lengthens the preceding vowel.
- i-vowel: The i vowel in the word dhi (goat) can be realized as various vowels in the Central Gheg dialects: [ðəi] (Krujë), [ðei] (Mountainous Krujë), [ðɛi] or [ðei] (Mat), as well as [ðai] or [ðɔi] in other regions.
- o-vowel: The o derounds to [ʌ] in some words in some dialects (e.g. [sʌt] for sot "today" in Krujë and among some Muslim speakers in Shkodër).
- u-vowel: The u vowel in different dialects occurring some words may vary, for example rrush "grape" may be [ruʃ], [rauʃ], [rɔuʃ], [rɔʃ], or [roʃ].
- y-vowel: The y vowel can remain as y (e.g. dy "two" in much of the Gheg speaking areas), derounded to i (e.g. [di] "two" in Debar), or becomes more open and less rounded to [ʏ̜] (e.g. [dʏ̜] "two" in Mat and Mountainous Krujë). In other words in Central Gheg, the y vowel can become [ø] as in [sø] for sy "eye" (Mat and Krujë).
- bj/pj: These may yield bgj or pq in some dialects (e.g. pqeshkë for pjeshkë "peach" in Negotin).
- bl/pl/fl: These may become bj/pj/fj or even bgj/pq in some dialects (e.g. pjak for plak "old" in Toplica or pqak for plak "old" in Negotin).
- dh and ll: These sounds may interchange in some words in some dialects, especially in the dialects of Kavajë, Tirana, and Durrës where ll completely replaces dh.
- h: This may drop in any position in some dialects.
- mb/nd: Consonant clusters such as nd vary greatly by sub-dialect: nder "honor" can realized as [ndɛɾ], [nd͉ɛɾ], [ⁿdɛɾ], [dɛɾ], [nɛɾ], or [nˠɛɾ].
- q/gj: In the Gheg dialects, q and gj may remain palatal stops [c] and [ɟ], change to postalveolar affricates [t͡ʃ] and [d͡ʒ] (and thus merging with Albanian ç and xh), change to alveolo-palatal affricates [t͡ɕ] and [d͡ʑ], or even change to alveolo-palatal fricatives [ɕ] and [ʑ].
- tj/dj: These may become palatal stops [c] and [ɟ] in some dialects.

=== Malsia Albanian ===
The Northwestern Gheg subdialect encompasses three main Albanian ethnographic regions: Malësia e Madhe, Shkodër and Lezhë. Within the Northwestern Gheg, the area of Malësia e Madhe shows different phonological, syntactic, and lexical patterns than the areas of Shkodër and Lezhë. For this reason, Malsia e Madhe Albanian can be considered a distinct variety of Northwestern Gheg. The different features of this variety can be traced to the historical and geographic isolation of the mountainous region of Malësia e Madhe (Albanian for 'Great Highlands').

The early isolated Malsia Albanian has preserved archaic features of Proto-Albanian and Proto-Indo-European in comparison to other Gheg varieties and to Tosk, such as the word-initial voiceless and voiced stops. Whereas Tosk Albanian has homorganic nasal-stop clusters, having produced a shift from the proto form that featured a word-initial stop to a nasal-stop cluster, which was achieved by placing a prefix en- (< PAlb preposition *en 'in'). Gheg Albanian is in a transitional position, featuring nasals that resulted from reduced nasal-stop clusters.

Malsia word-initial stop vs. the innovation of nasal-stop clusters in other dialects
PIE	Malsia	Tosk	Gheg
*peh₂- 'protect'	pɔ:j 'to hold, keep'	mbaj 'hold, carry'	mɔ:j
*bʰer- 'bear, carry'	bɔ:j 'carry'	mbaj 'hold, carry'	mɔ:j
*ten 'stretch, tighten'	tæ̃:n 'push, press'	ndej 'hold, carry'	
*deh₂- 'share, divide'	dɔ: 'split, cut, divide'	ndaj	dɔ:
*gʰodʰ-, (o-grade of *gʰedʰ-)	gæ: 'time, chance, opportunity'	ŋge	

Examples of the formation of nasal-stop clusters by placing the prefix en- with unstressed word-initial vowel are: Tosk mbuʃa 'to fill', from PAlb *en-busa (vs. Malsia buʃa); Tosk ŋga 'where, from where', from PAlb *en-ka (vs. Malsia ka); Tosk ŋgula 'to thrust, put on point', from PAlb *en-kula (vs. Malsia ku:ʎ); Tosk ndej 'to stretch', from PAlb *en-tenja (vs. Malsia tæ̃:n).

The PAlb preposition *en 'in' has been preserved solely in the Malsia Albanian dialect, whereas in the other Gheg varieties and in Tosk it has been reanalyzed as a prefix attached to other lexical terms, no longer existing as a preposition.

== Transitional dialects ==
The transitional dialects are spoken in southern Elbasan so-called Greater Elbasan (Cërrik, Dumre, Dushk, Papër, Polis, Qafe, Shpat, Sulovë, Thanë), southern Peqin, northwestern Gramsh, northern Kuçovë, northern Berat, extreme western Rrogozhinë, northern and central Lushnjë and southern Librazhd (Bërzeshtë, Rrajcë), and Flazian-Falazdim-whish spoken in north of Albania.

=== Transitional features ===
- Rhotacism: Proto-Albanian *-n- becomes -r- (e.g. Gheg râna < rêra, rëra "sand").
- Proto-Albanian *ō becomes vo in the western sub-dialects or va in the central and eastern sub-dialects.
- Nasal vowels: In some sub-dialects of Transitional, some nasal vowels denasalize (e.g. rora "sand" in Sulovë) while in other words the nasals are retained: sŷ "eye" (Dumre, Shpat, Sulovë).
- ô-vowel: Some sub-dialects have ô for â in some words (e.g. ôma "taste" in Sulovë).
- Mb/Nd: Clusters such as mb become m in some dialects (e.g. kôma for standard këmba "leg").

== Tosk dialects ==
Tosk is divided into five sub-dialects: Northern Tosk, Labërisht, Çam, Arvanitika, and Arbëresh. Northern Tosk is spoken in Berat, Fier, Skrapar, southern Kuçovë, southern Lushnjë, extreme southeastern Elbasan, most of Gramsh, Kolonjë, northern Mallakastër, northern Vlorë, Korçë, Ohër, Devoll, Përmet, east of the Vjosë river of Tepelenë, southern Struga (western shore of Lake Ohër), Pogradec, Prespa and northern Vlorë. Lab (or Labërisht) is spoken in southern Vlorë, Dukat, Himarë, southern Mallakastër, Delvinë, southern Çepan of Skrapar, eastern and southern Kolonjë, eastern and southern Leskovik, western and southern Përmet, west of the Vjosë river of Tepelenë, Gjirokastër and Sarandë. Çam is spoken in southern Sarandë (Konispol, Ksamil, Markat, Xarrë) and in parts of northern Greece. Tosk dialects are spoken by most members of the large Albanian immigrant communities of Egypt, Turkey, and Ukraine. Çamërisht is spoken in northwestern Greece, while Arvanitika is spoken by the Arvanites in southern Greece, mainly on the Peloponnese, Attica, Euboea, and the adjacent islands. Arbëresh is spoken by the Arbëreshë, descendants of 15th and 16th century migrants who settled in Southern Italy, in small communities in the regions of Sicily, Calabria, Basilicata, Campania, Molise, Abruzzi, and Apulia.

=== Tosk features ===
- Rhotacism: Proto-Albanian *-n- becomes -r- (e.g. rëra "sand")
- Proto-Albanian *ō becomes va.
- Nasal vowels: There is a lack of nasal vowels in Tosk (e.g. sy "eye") and Late Proto-Albanian *â plus a nasal becomes ë (e.g. nëntë "nine"). However, nasal vowels have been reported in the Lab dialects of Himarë and Kurvelesh and separately in the Lab dialect of Borsh.
- e-vowel: The e becomes ë in some dialects in some words qën for qen "dog" in Vjosë.
- ë-vowel: The ë may have several pronunciations depending on dialect: mëz "foal" is [mʌz] in Vuno) while ë is more backed in Labërisht. Final -ë drops in many Tosk dialects and lengthens the preceding vowel.
- y-vowel: The y vowel often derounds to i in the southern dialects Labërisht, Çam, Arvanitika and Arbëresh (e.g. dy "two" becomes di).
- Dh and Ll: These sounds may interchange in some words in some dialects.
- H: This may drop in any position in some dialects.
- Gl/Kl: Some dialects such as Çam, Arberësh, and Arvanitika retain archaic kl and gl in place of q and gj, to which they have shifted in other places (e.g. gjuhë "tongue" is gluhë in Çam, gluhë in Arberësh, and gljuhë in Arvanitika; "klumësh" for "qumësht" "milk" in Arbëresh).
- Rr: Rr becomes r in some dialects.

== Comparison ==
Standard	Tosk	Gheg	English
Shqipëri	Shqipëri	Shqypní / Shqipni	Albania
një	një	i / ni / nji / njâ / njo	one
nëntë	nëntë	nônd / nônt / nôn / nând / nânt / nân	nine
është	është	âsht / â, osht / ô	is
bëj	bëj	bâj / bôj	I do
emër	emër / embër	êmën	name
pjekuri	pjekri / pjekuri	pjekni / pjekuni	mellowness
gjendje	gjëndje	gjêndje / gjênje	state, condition
zog	zog	zog, zëq / zëç / zëg	bird
mbret	mbret	mrêt	king
për të punuar	për të punuar	me punue / me punu, për t'punũ	to work
rërë	rërë	rânë / rônë	sand
qenë	qënë	kjên / kên / kân / kôn	be
dëllinjë	enjë	bërshê	juniper
baltë	llum	lloq, llok	mud
fshat	fshat	katun / kotun	village
qumësht	qumësht / klumsht	tâmbël / tâmël /tomël	milk
cimbidh	mashë	danë, mashë	fire-iron
mundem	mundem	mûj / mûnem, munëm / mûnëm	I can
vend	vënd	vên	place
dhelpër	dhelpër	skile / dhelpën	fox

== Bibliography ==
- Brown, Keith; Ogilvie, Sarah (2008). Concise Encyclopedia of Languages of the World. Elsevier. ISBN 978-0-08-087774-7.
- Byron, J. L. Selection among Alternates in Language Standardization: The Case of Albanian. The Hague: Mouton, 1976.
- Dedvukaj, Lindon; Ndoci, Rexhina (2023). "Linguistic variation within the Northwestern Gheg Albanian dialect". Proceedings of the Linguistic Society of America. 8 (1). Linguistic Society of America. doi:10.3765/plsa.v8i1.5501.
- Dedvukaj, Lindon; Gehringer, Patrick (2023). "Morphological and phonological origins of Albanian nasals and its parallels with other laws". Proceedings of the Linguistic Society of America. 8 (1). Linguistic Society of America. doi:10.3765/plsa.v8i1.5508.
- Domi, Mahir et al. Dialektologjia shqiptare. 5 vols. Tirana, 1971-1987.
- Fortson IV, Benjamin W. (2010). Indo-European Language and Culture: An Introduction (2nd ed.). Malden: Wiley-Blackwell. ISBN 978-1-4051-0316-9.
- Gjinari, Jorgji. Dialektologjia shqiptare. Pristina: Universiteti, 1970.
- Gjinari, Jorgji, Bahri Beci, Gjovalin Shkurtaj, & Xheladin Gosturani. Atlasi dialektologjik i gjuhës shqipe, vol. 1. Naples: Università degli Studi di Napoli L’Orientali, 2007.
- Hamp, Eric P. (1963). "The Position of Albanian". University of California.
- Lloshi, Xhevat. “Substandard Albanian and Its Relation to Standard Albanian”, in Sprachlicher Standard und Substandard in Südosteuropa und Osteuropa: Beiträge zum Symposium vom 12.-16. Oktober 1992 in Berlin. Edited by Norbert Reiter, Uwe Hinrichs & Jirina van Leeuwen-Turnovcova. Berlin: Otto Harrassowitz, 1994, pp. 184–194.
- Lowman, G. S. "The Phonetics of Albanian", Language, vol. 8, no. 4 (Dec., 1932);271–293.
- Mallory, J. P.; Adams, Douglas Q. (1997). Encyclopedia of Indo-European Culture. Taylor & Francis. ISBN 978-1-884964-98-5.
- Panov, M. and Sidanivoski, J. Gostivarskiot kraj. Gostivar: Sobranie na opštinata, 1970.
- Paçarizi, Rrahman (2008). Albanian Language (PDF). University of Pristina. Archived from the original (PDF) on 2017-07-17.
- Totoni, Menela (1964). "E folmja e bregdetit të poshtëm". Studime Filologjike I (in Albanian). Tirana: Universiteti i Tiranës.
- Vehbiu, Ardian. “Standard Albanian and the Gheg Renaissance: A Sociolinguistic Perspective”, International Journal of Albanian Studies 1 (1997): 1–14.
