= Milto Sotir Gurra =

Albanian writer and journalist (1884–1972)

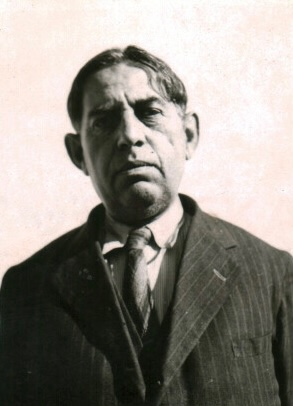
- Gurra in 1945
- Born: 16 May 1884; Opar, Korçë, Ottoman Albania
- Died: 1972 (aged 87–88); Tirana, People's Socialist Republic of Albania
- Occupations: Journalist, Writer
- Writing career
- Language: Albanian

Milto Sotir Gurra (May 16, 1884 – 1972) was an Albanian journalist and short story writer of the 20th century. His first works came out during the last period of the Albanian National Awakening and continued for a 50-year period. Although simple in character and at times permeated by naive sentimentality, his work reserves a certain importance in Albanian literature due to its social context and thematics. Gurra also translated to Albanian some of the masterpieces of classic Russian literature.

== Life and work ==
Gurra was born on 16 May 1884 in Marjan village of the Opar region near Korçë, back then part of the Ottoman Empire, today's southeastern Albania. As many southern Albanians, he had to emigrate at a young age. Gurra settled initially in Odessa, and later in Istanbul, Sofia, Constanța, and the United States. He collaborated with the local established Albanian communities and their press organs using the pen-names "Nomadhi", "Gjon Zeza", and "D.Toçka". His initial literature work consisted of short stories. They were periodically published in the Shqiperia (Albania) journal of Kristo Luarasi in Sofia, Bulgaria, and were later compiled in two story collections in 1911: Goca e Malësisë (The Highland Girl) and Rrëfenja (Narrations). His best stories are considered to be the ones written while residing in Odessa. Gurra published or co-published also his own journals, such as Atdheu (The homeland) published in Constanța, Romania in 1912, the monthly Shkëndija (The sparkle) of 1921 in Korçë, Zekthi (The gadfly), a satiric paper, and Zëri i Popullit (The voice of the people), a bi-monthly social-political journal, started in 1922 in Korçë, Mituria (The childhood), and Vatra a Rinisë (Hearth of Youth) where he published pieces written for children. As a journalist, he published articles in the Albanian communities' newspapers, such as Dielli (The sun), Kombi (The nation), Bashkimi i Kombit (Nation's Unity), Shqypeja e Shqypenis, etc.

He translated Russian literature works from Tolstoy, Turgenev, Chekhov, and Gorky.

== Death ==
Gurra died in Tirana in 1972.

== Writing style ==
Gurra's writing activity spans in around 50 years. His initial work expressed a mixture of Nationalist and Romantic ideas conform the general line of the National Awakening, like many other Albanian writers and poets of the same era.

Later works would be characterized by sentimentalism. As an emigrant, he was close to the problems and difficulties that the Albanian diaspora continuously dealt with. He described emigration as a tragedy which had made miserable the lives of many. The short story "The mother" describes how emigration destroyed families and filled people's lives with anxiety. Loneliness and the unhappy lives of the emigrants families is the theme of the short stories "The death of Mara" and "The belated cheque". In a number of stories, such as "Life after death", Gurra described the life of big cities, and how the lights and pleasures ruined many young emigrants. A collection of 22 of these stories were published in Tirana in 1938 under the name Plagët e Kurbetit (Torments of exile), where he also shows influence from O.Henry and Maupassant.

Beside prose, Gurra left also a poetic collection named Dëshirë (Desire). The Albanian composer Kristo Kono used some of Gurra's poetry and composed songs, such as Fol e qesh moj sylarushe (Talk and laugh o you bright eyed girl"), which entered the classic reportorial of the urban lyric music in Albania.
