= Culture of Upper Reka =

The Culture of Upper Reka is a subculture of Macedonia located in the region of Upper Reka. The combination of a unique history, geographic isolation and maintenance of strong regional identity separate from surrounding areas has made Upper Reka renown for its distinctive customs, observances and other forms of folk culture.

== Clothing ==
The traditional clothing of Upper Reka, though sharing similarities with clothing of surrounding areas, is known for its distinctive regional style and use of multiple colours, as well as complex floral and other patterns. The Upper Reka village of Žužnje in particular became renown for its handicrafts and traditional women's costumes that used silver beads and filigree making them some of the most picturesque in the region.

=== Female attire ===
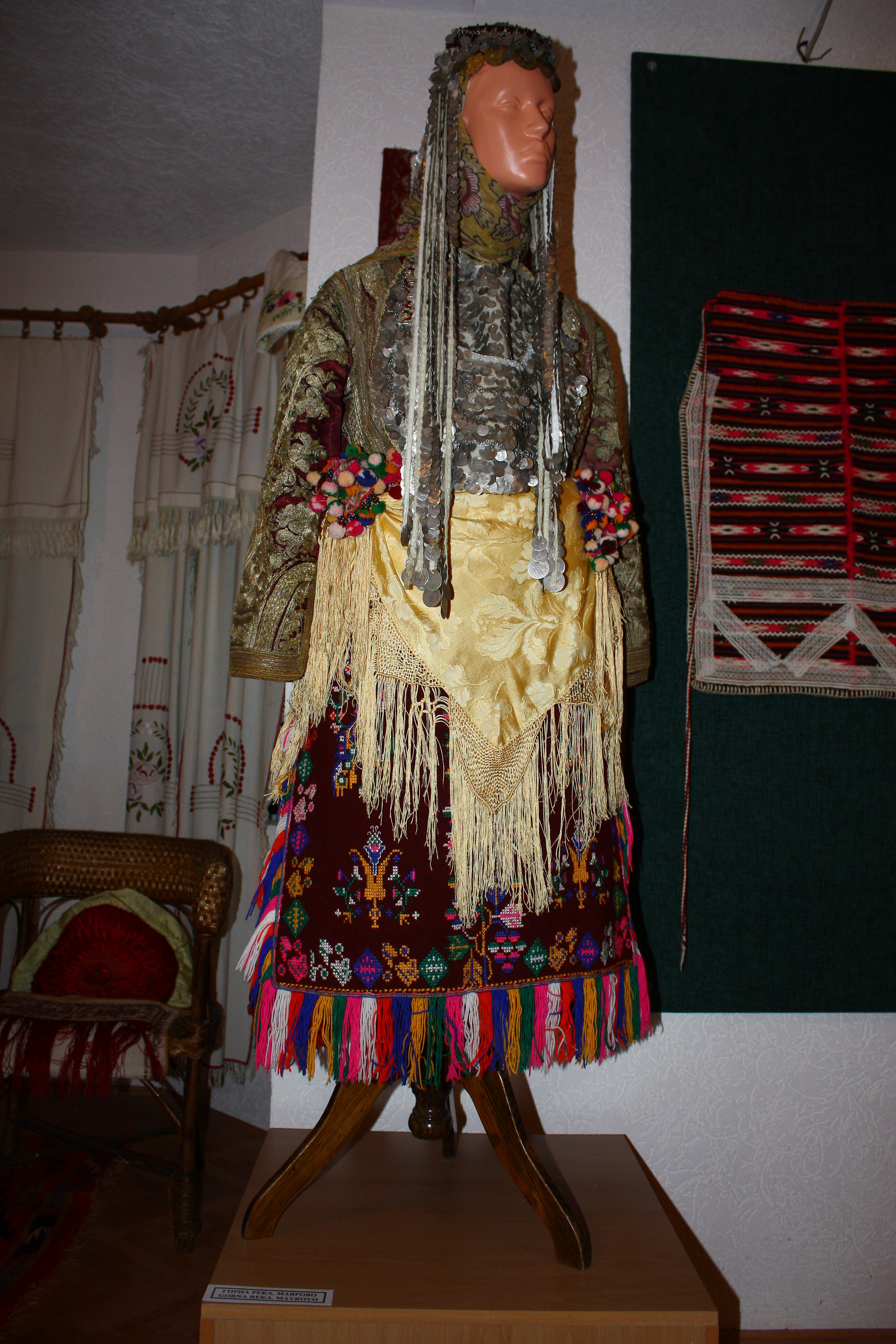
Upper Reka female attire

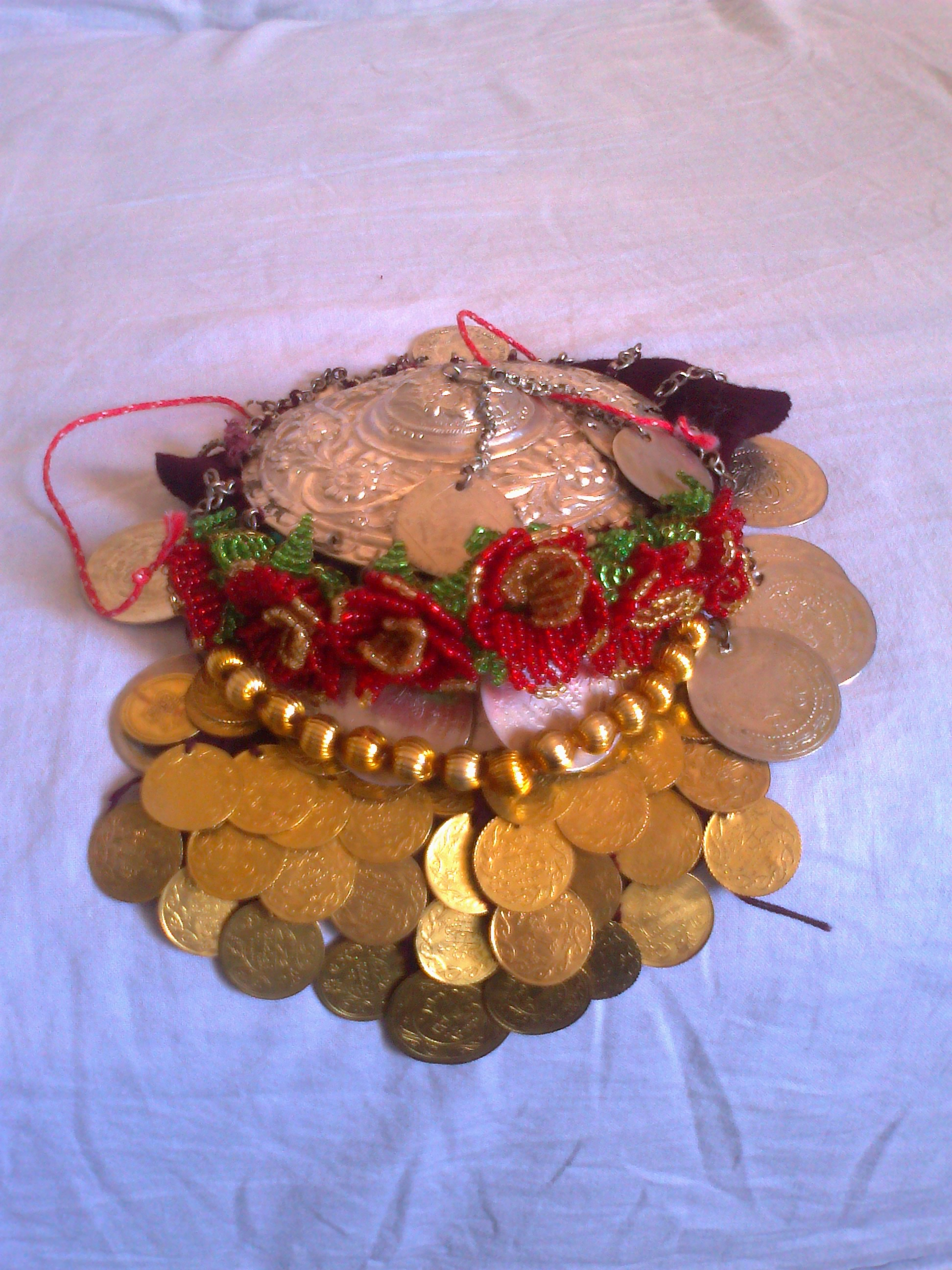
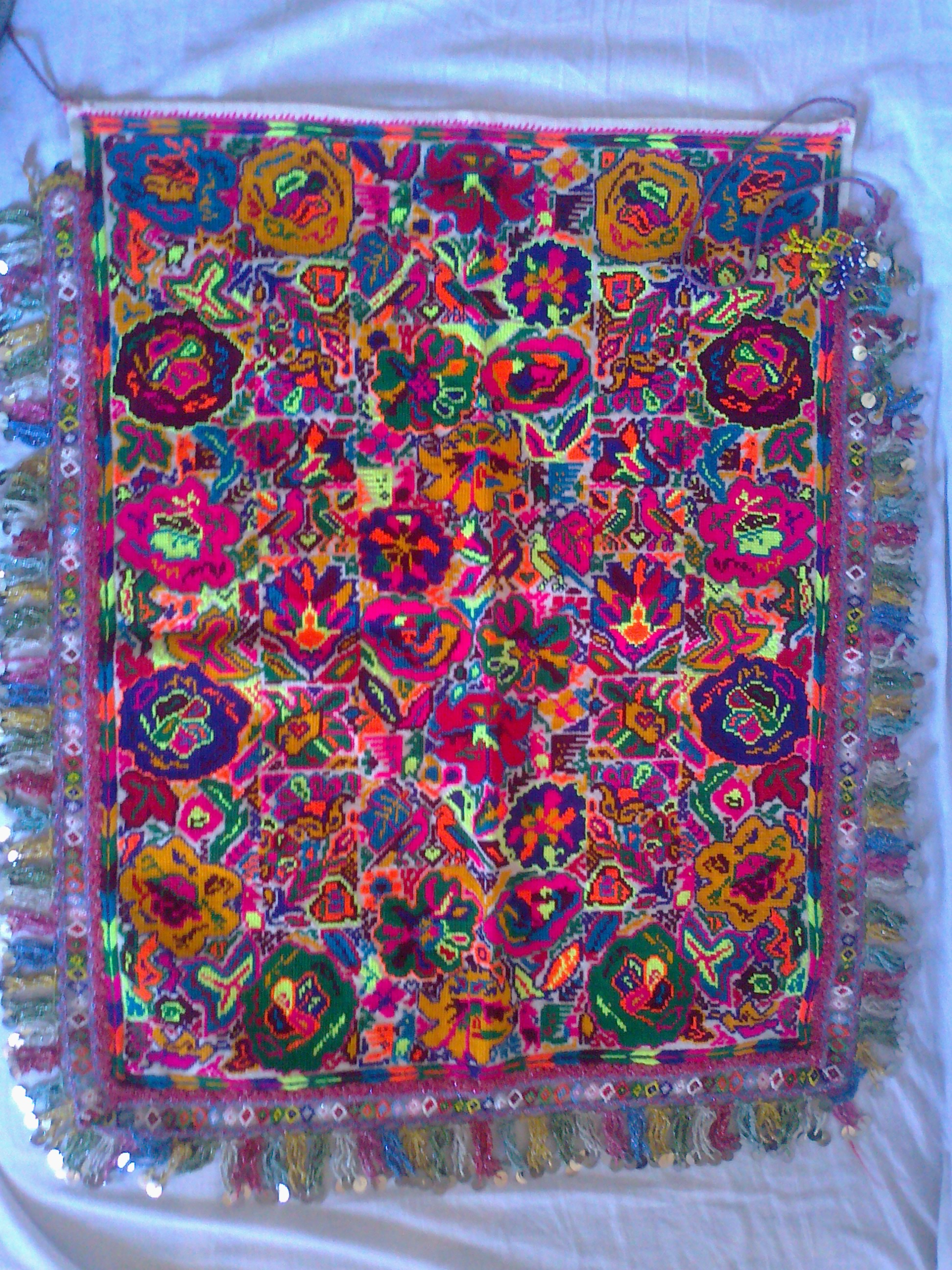
fshtura (left) and peshtelka (right). Clothing from Upper Reka
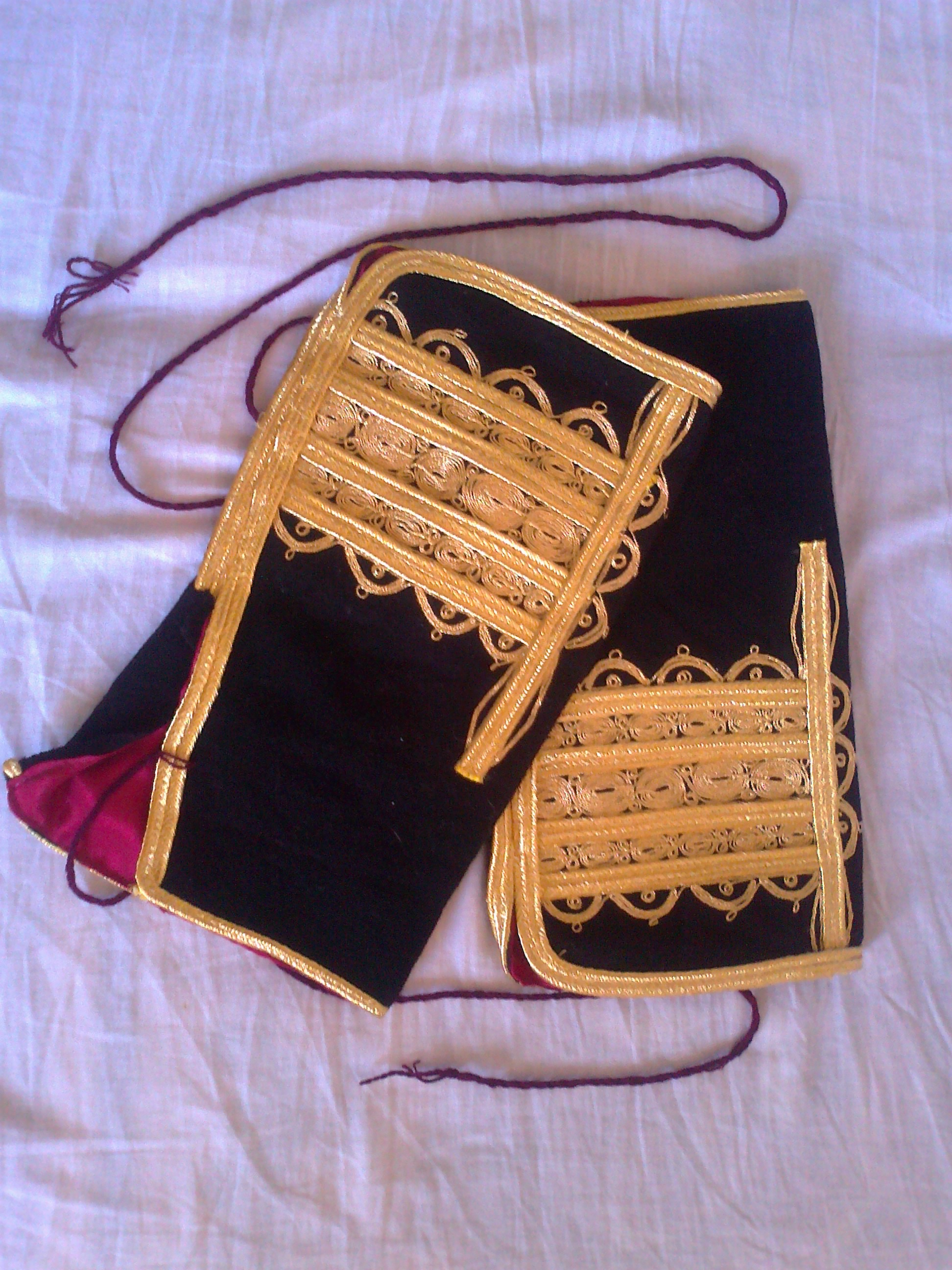
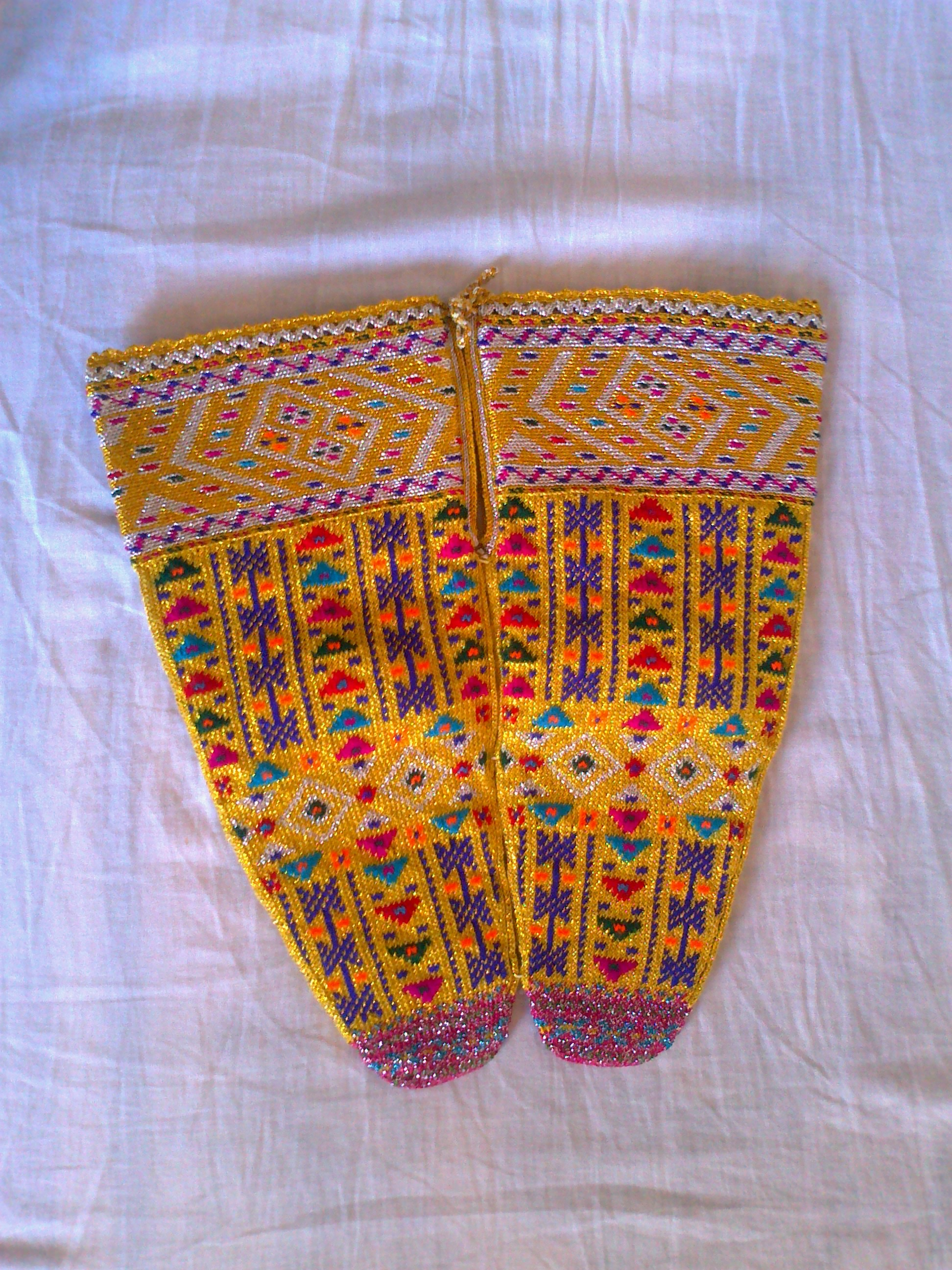
tazlluka/t (left) and kalçin/t (right). Clothing from Upper Reka

Some items of traditional clothing worn by women include the fustan or dress, atop with a multicoloured embroidered peshtelka or front apron. A dollomba (Standard Albanian: dolloma) or long dress robe of a red colour with heavily embroidered patterned sleeves and chest area of yellow or silver white thread was considered a major item of clothing for women. Muslim women, when outside, also wore a black or navy blue coloured ferexhja or hijab with a multicoloured embroidered chest area. Also worn was a xhybeli or sleeveless vest with heavy yellow embroidery along the chest and neck area and a mitan (mintan) or tight fitting (often black) coloured vest, with heavy embroidery along the sleeves. The tazlluka/t, or lower knee padded stockings are heavily embroidered on either black or red cloth and are worn above the multicoloured patterned kalçin/t or socks. Jewelry worn consisted of a fshtura which is a silver or gold plate with engraved patterns alongside dangling coins fastened around the waist. A qysteku or silver necklace with a dangling ornament is worn around the neck, while Orthodox Christians still wear a silver krysh (kryq) or cross necklace. Elaborate headdresses for special occasions like the veshkat are worn on the forehead made up of rows of dangling silver coins and patkojt worn on the back with additional ornaments and decorations. Young girls sometimes wear a kunora (kurorë) or laurel crown made of flowers. A multicoloured korpa (shami) or headscarf is also worn. Women mainly wear their hair in kërcajshe or multiple ponytails often consisting of 5 to 8 plaited braids depending on age worn at the back of the head.

=== Male attire ===
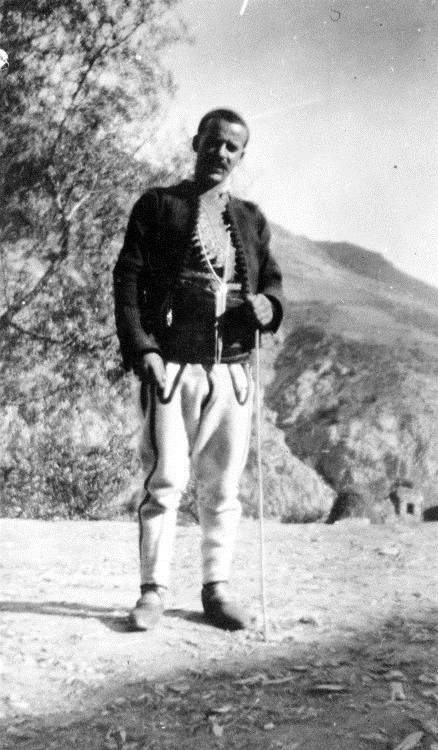
Albanian Upper Reka groom wearing xhamadan vest jacket and tirq pants, circa 1907

Male attire of Upper Reka consists of a kmisha (këmisha), which means shirt, and a fanella, which means jumper. Also worn atop those clothes is a xhamadan or a man's short close-fitting white vest like jacket with black embroidery on the sides. The xhybeli or sleeveless vest with heavy yellow embroidery along the chest and neck area and a mitan (mintan) or tight fitting often black coloured vest with heavy embroidery along the sleeves. Tirgj (tirq) or white woolen pants with strips of black embroidery on the side from the waist till ankle and around the pocket areas located around the front waist area were worn by all males. These are fastened with a brez leshi' or woolen belt; the tradition for the wealthy was that they would instead wear a brez mdashi (brez mëndafshi) or silk belt around the waist. Kalçin/t or socks would be worn in opinga or shoes made from animal skins. On the head, a male would wear the ptis (plis) or white conical hat known as a pileus, or qeleshe.

== Observances and Customs ==
=== Secular and Orthodox Christian holidays ===
In Upper Reka, a number of secular and religious holidays are celebrated. The Day of Shumtanas (Standard Albanian: Shën Thanas/Tanush) or St. Athanasius is observed during February marked by a big meal consisting of sarma or stuffed vine leaves with rice and kikurama made of cereals. On this day, girls also gathered, entertained and cooked a salted pastry called fli. The Orthodox of Ničpur celebrated St. Athanasius on January 31 (Julian calendar). Toward the end of February, both Muslims and Christians would conduct a ceremony called todore (definite: todorja) meaning Theodora on a Thursday. Activities conducted were the village young led in song to an elderly women's house, with old cloths and shuttles from a loom. A bonfire would be lit there and a todore or type of scarecrow built (also known locally as a dozhdole) out of shuttles and sticks, dressed in female attire and paraded around the village to songs. Brought back to the place of origin and dressed up in new clothing, it was once again taken around the village accompanied by love songs. Thereafter the ritual would be repeated a third time with the todore dressed in male attire. On conclusion, villagers would take their shuttles and sticks back home. The ceremony was thought to be useful in relation to rainmaking. On the 1st of March, Diten e Vers (Dita e Verës) or the first Day of Spring is celebrated. Certain customs were observed marking the coming of spring during the twentieth century. For example, after a hide and seek of raw eggs, girls placed them over a fire to see what possible marriage prospects would be indicated in the direction of its immediate rupture. A slow bursting egg was taken as a bad omen and unlikely marriage for that particular year. Whereas waking up early on the day was seen important as not doing so meant that throughout summer, late risers would not take advantage of the day. While a singing bird in the morning heralded happiness, yet seeing an elderly woman at that time inferred bad luck. Another custom involved dumping ashes unnoticed into a neighbours yard to ward off fleas during the summer.

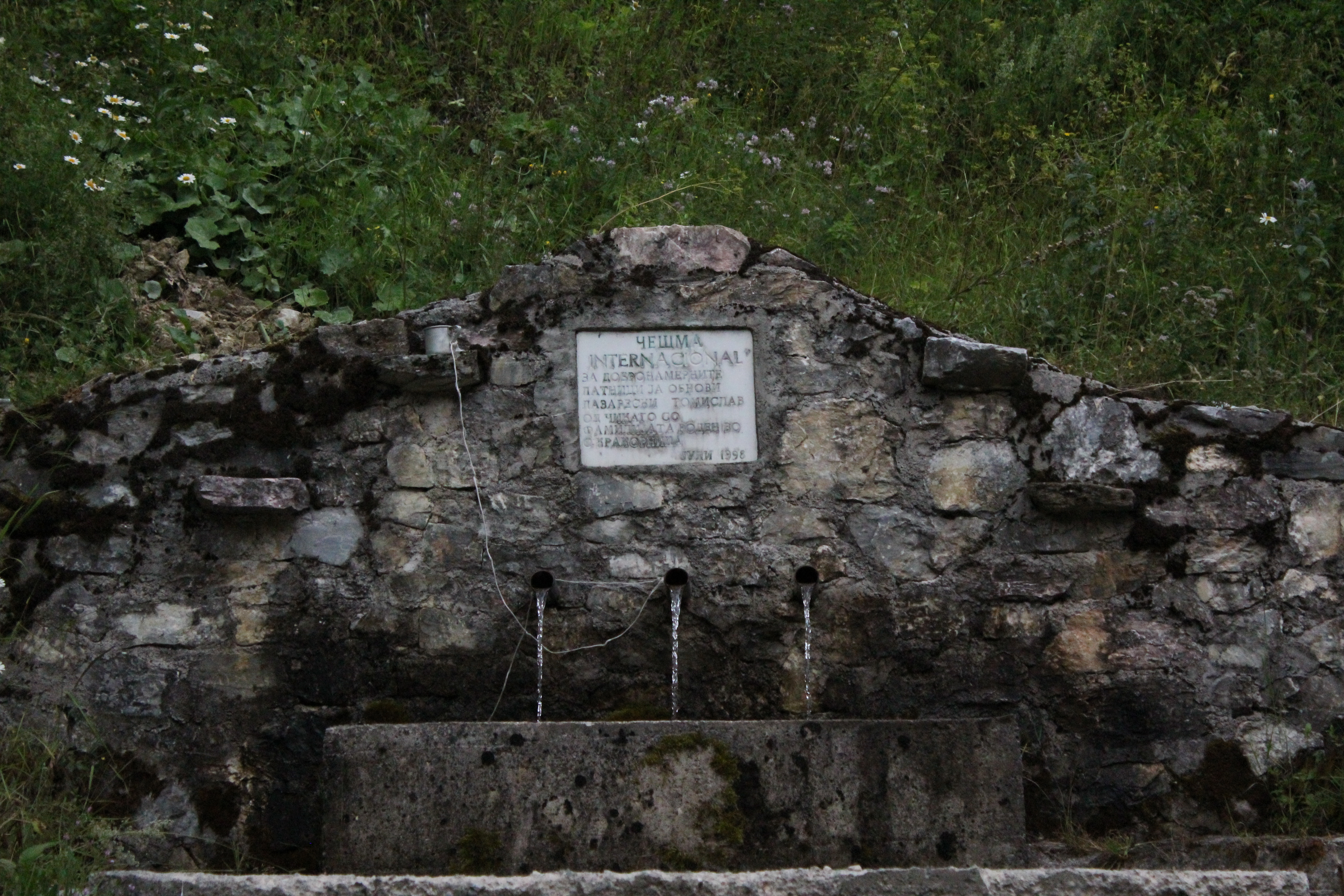
Krakornica village mountain spring

In late April, houses would be traditionally whitewashed in preparation for Day of Shingjergj (Shën Gjergj) or St. George which heralded the coming of summer and its significance for bestowing blessings for the following six months. Two salted pastries ndurdhi and tengenica would be consumed by all, especially children. Best clothes were worn, target shooting by boys undertaken, while girls gathered in the meadows to sing and dance and swung on a swing called hujli made of knitting connected to a tree branch. Flowers and green branches would be brought home and two branches placed on every window and door. The other custom practiced was going to certain kroni or mountain spring that were said by locals to be enchanted with supernatural powers and known as biguer (definite: bigor) or holy well. Of those Bigueri Vaut, Bigueri Niçpurit and Bigueri Reçit were frequented. On Shingjergj, some women with problems went to a biguer. There they drank its water as a cure for either ailments, infertility and/or to ward off mingji or witchcraft/bad magic, while leaving a coin in return as a gift for the assistance given at the spring. In Kičinica, the Orthodox celebrated Shën Gjergj e Dimrit or Saint George of the Winter. On May 14 Shën Eremia or St. Jeremiah's day was a time for planting beans whose seeds were moistened with holy water, blessed by a priest and after sunset planted. During the evening, children placed bells around their necks while running around outside the house beating metal pots to ward off snakes and moles in the area. Fires at night were lit to preserve homes from snakes.

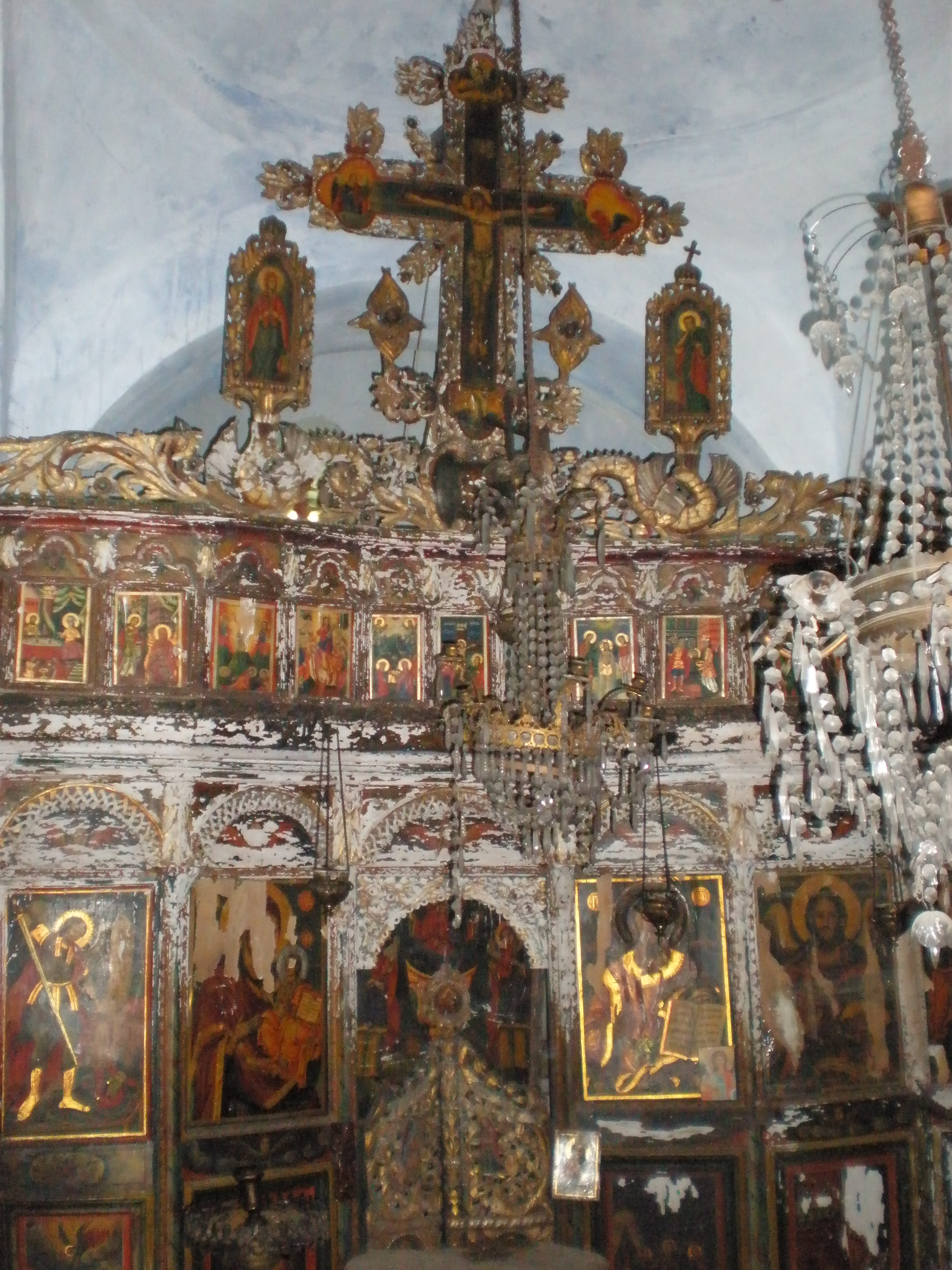
Iconostasis of St. Demetrius church, Volkovija

The next celebration to follow was Shnkrysh (Lartësimi i Kryqit or Ngritja e Kryqit and Ngadhënjimi i Kryqit të Shenjtë) or Feast of the Cross that falls six weeks before the Day of Shmitr (Shën Dhimitër/Mitër) or St. Demetrius. It is known as a day of rest with similar customs to Shingjergj occurring, along with hallva being consumed. St. Demetrius is the village patron saint of Volkovija and Nistrovo, while St. Michael of Krakornica village. Other holidays celebrated are the Day of Shnkol (Shën Nikolla/Koll) or St. Nicholas and Blagavesht (Ungjillëzimi i Hyjlindëses Mari/Mëri) or the Annunciation which was also known to Muslims, due to coexistence with the Orthodox population. Observance by Muslims occurred too as they would visit their Orthodox neighbours and be given dyed red Easter eggs that were also consumed even by the local hoxha or imam. Due to such religious syncretism in Upper Reka, Muslim oral traditions held that the dyed eggs symbolised the blood of a Muslim saint. Other customs on the day involved housewives going to the village fountain, filling water jugs and adding into them basil flowers, a silver coin and sugar. The jugs were taken to church and later home to be consumed by the household. During the afternoon and in a nearby meadow, a festive gathering would be held where unmarried women dressed in their finest clothing would sing and place rings onto the grass. The grass would be torn off with their teeth and placed in jugs with holy water that later was given to farm animals to drink and to ensure reproduction. While fruit trees would be bound with straw and so as to ensure a good crop threatened with an axe. On December 4, Shën Mëria e Dimrit or the Day of St. Mary of Winter was observed by the Orthodox of Bibaj, while in Sence the Orthodox celebrated the day of Shën Mëria e Vogël or Little Saint Mary. Whereas on the same date the feast day of St. Barbara would be observed in Beličica with bread blessed and portioned out amongst the household.

=== Muslim holidays ===
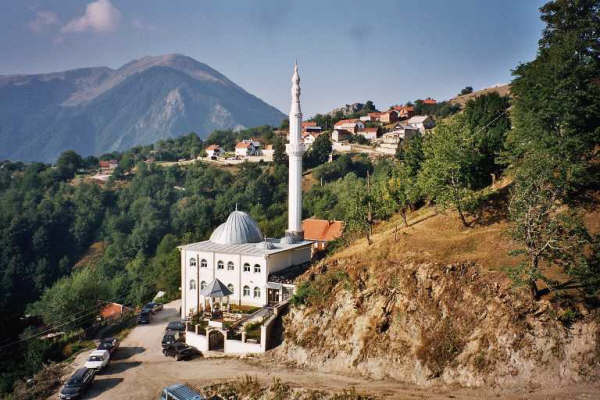
Vrbjani village mosque

As for Islamic religious celebrations, around the time of Diten e Vers (Summer Day) a similar Spring celebration Sultan Nevrus (Sultan Nevruz) or Nowruz is held to mark the coming flowering of nature and end of the yearly hibernation of animals, a process seen as an awakening by God of life. A sweet called hallva is consumed and also distributed throughout the village to the less well off. A silver ring would also be hung to a tree to gain God's adoration if it bent and at the following dawn taken back. Of the night, the elderly maintained the primacy of prayer to God and that dead souls returned home. Upper Reka Muslims also observe Ramadan and the two Bayrams (Eid al-Fitr, and Eid al-Adha). During Ramadan, mosque visits occurred and hallva would be distributed to the needy and for others to take home and consume. In the evening prayers would be said and before dawn two wandering Roma with drum and flute would wake villagers to consume a Ramadan breakfast meal called syfyr or suhur, so as to be ready for the day. Daily fasting occurred, with only infants being fed. After sunset, those Roma with drums would herald the end of the daily fast and a large Ramadan dinner meal called iftar would be eaten, followed by prayers. On the 15th day of Ramadan hallva is exchanged amongst villagers, given out to the poor and eaten at home, otherwise the day is not usually celebrated. On the eve of Bayram or verxhilia Bejrami (i.e., Bajram vigil), people would bathe and be given new clothes, shoes and so on. The imam frowned upon the term verxhilia or vigil describing Bayram eve. On the day one would use the expression arife for a person and wish best wishes. Children would play in the village centre and adults prepared bread, other food and a pastry known as koleç. An act of fitr or charity would also be done such as giving money to the poor or to the imam and the bigger festival of Ramadan was considered not complete without this act.

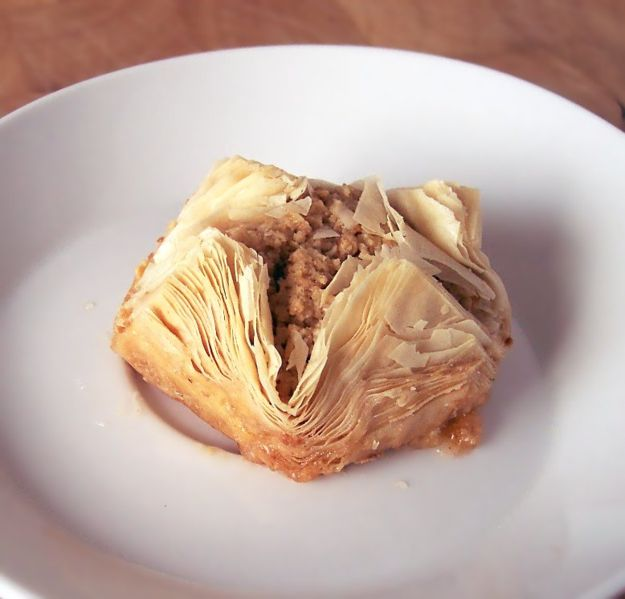
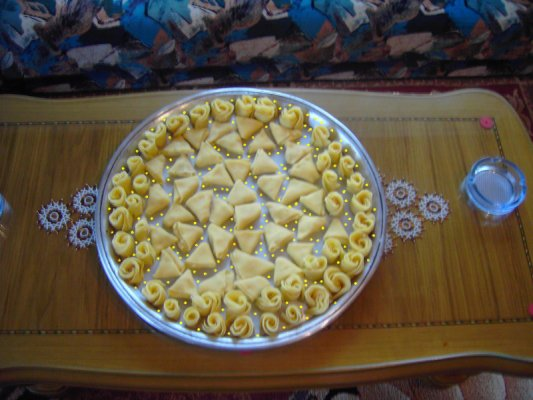
Baklava (left) and Sheqerpare (right). Desserts from Upper Reka

The commencement of Bayram celebrations started with Sheqer Bejrami or Sugar Bayram (also known as Bajram i Madh or Big Bayram), globally called Eid al-Fitr. It began with dawn visits to the mosque, followed by celebrations and feasting. These observances marked the end of Ramadan whereby a lump of sugar would also be consumed. Men would be greeted with kisses to the cheek, while young men would greet older women with a hand kissing practice that ends with placement of her hand to his forehead. Greetings thereafter exchanged in such contexts were egsofsh Bejramin or “happy Bayram” which was answered with gaz paç, e qofsh shnosh or “you too, and to your health”. Throughout the remainder of the day mutual visits followed where sherbet would be served and baklava too amongst themselves and to Orthodox neighbours. This would be followed a while later with another celebration called Bejram or Eid al-Adha (also known as Barjam i Vogël or smaller Bayram). Six days prior to the day, the elderly would fast as done during Ramadan. On this day however, a kurban or sacrifice of a ram would occur followed by visits to the mosque and later the ram's meat distributed to the poor.

== Gallery ==
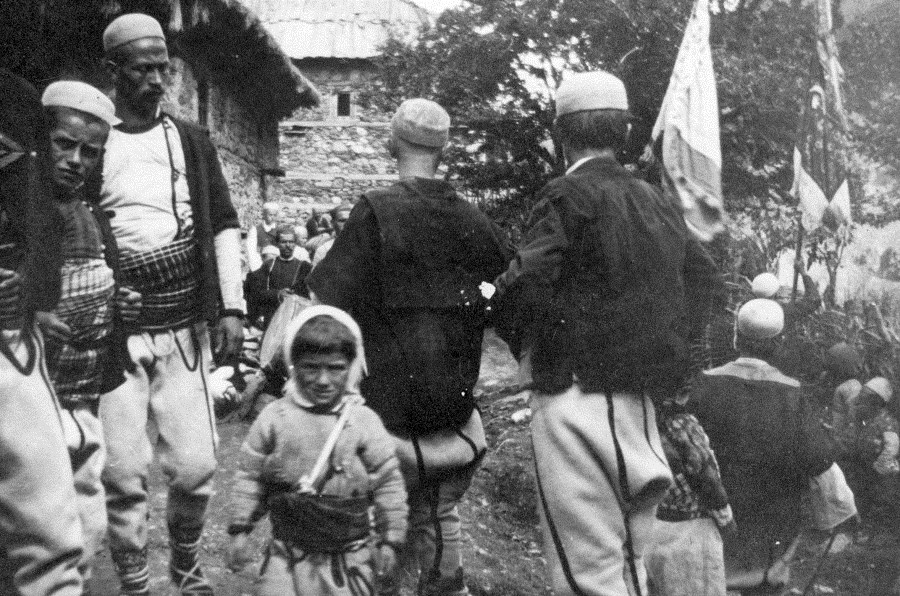
Arrival of a wedding party in Štirovica, 1907

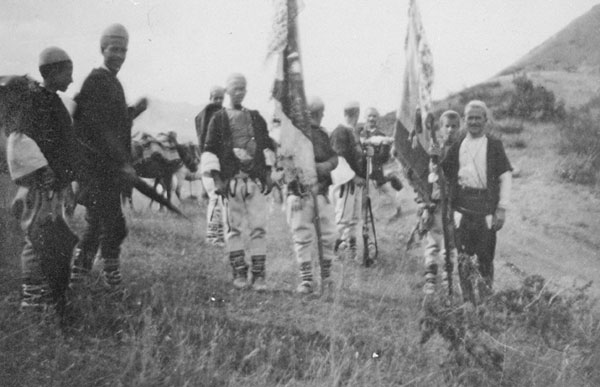
Wedding party in the mountains of Upper Reka, 1907

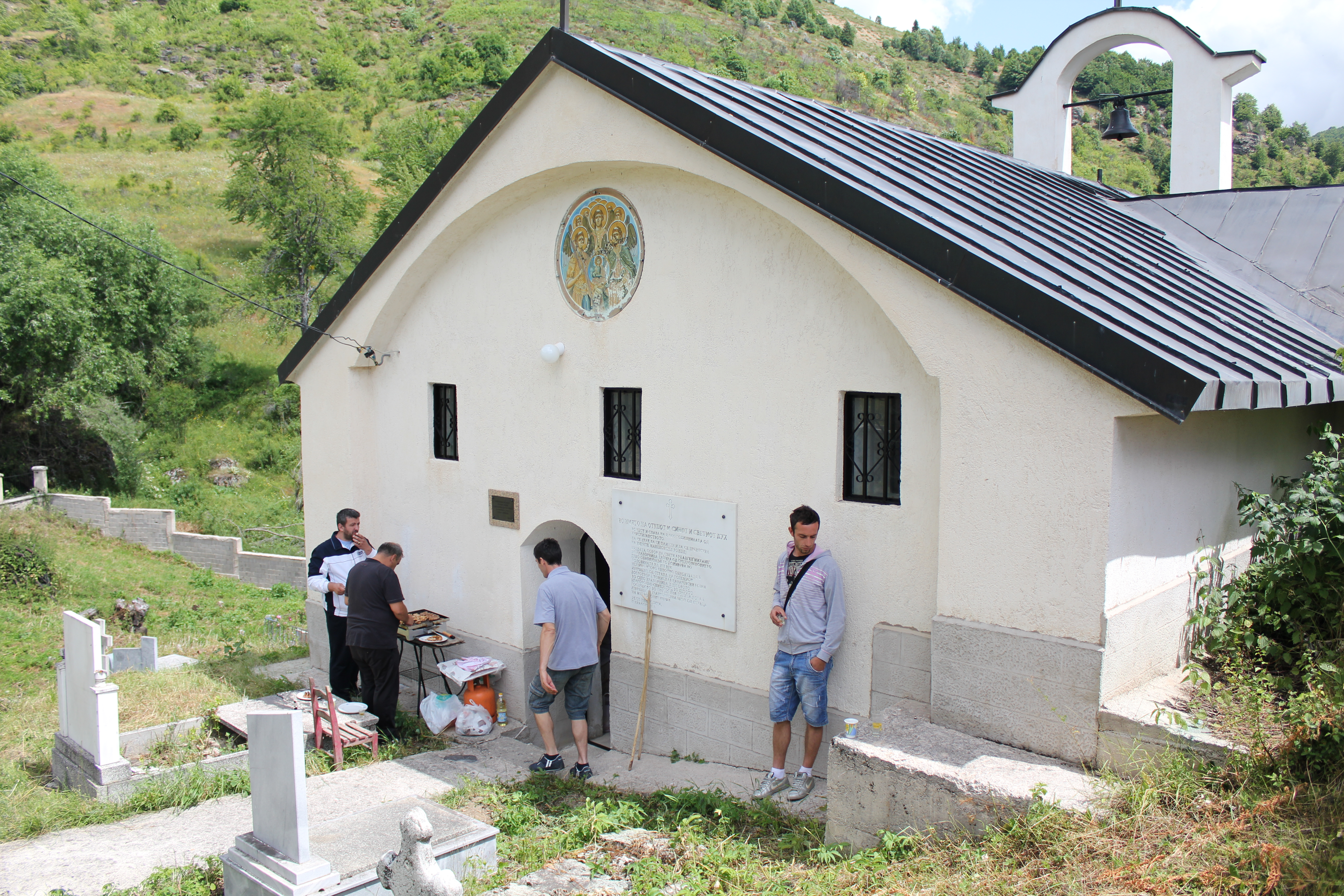
St. Archangel Michael church, Krakornica

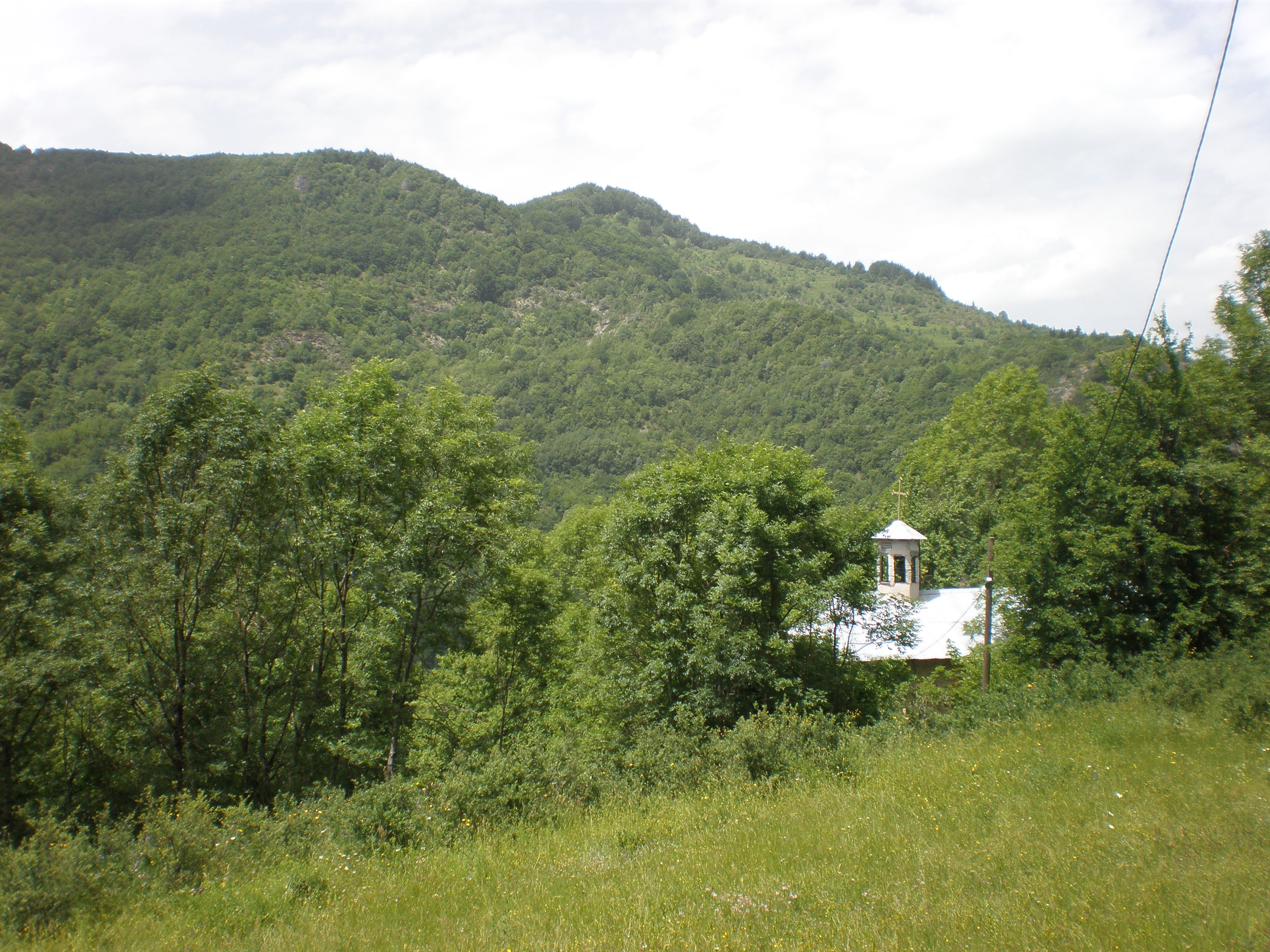
View of the Church of St. Demetrius, Volkovija

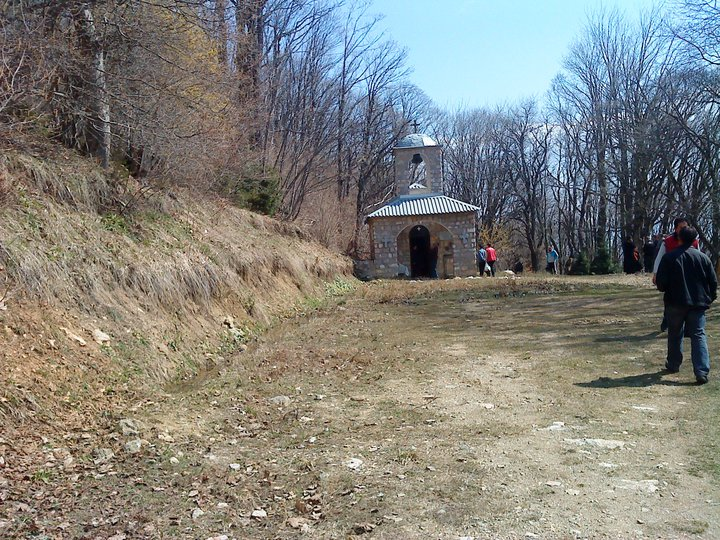
Vrben monastery

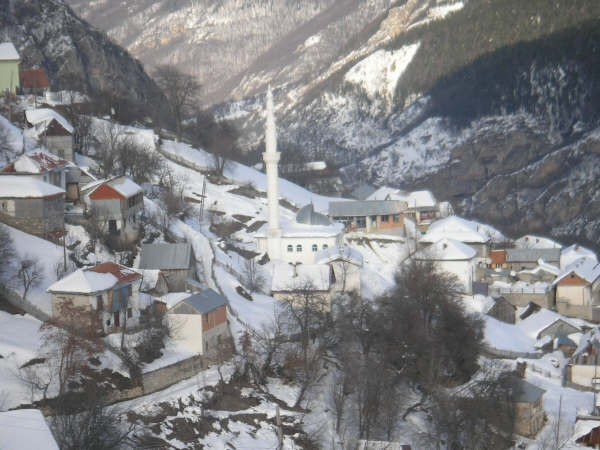
Winter in Vrbjani with mosque in the background

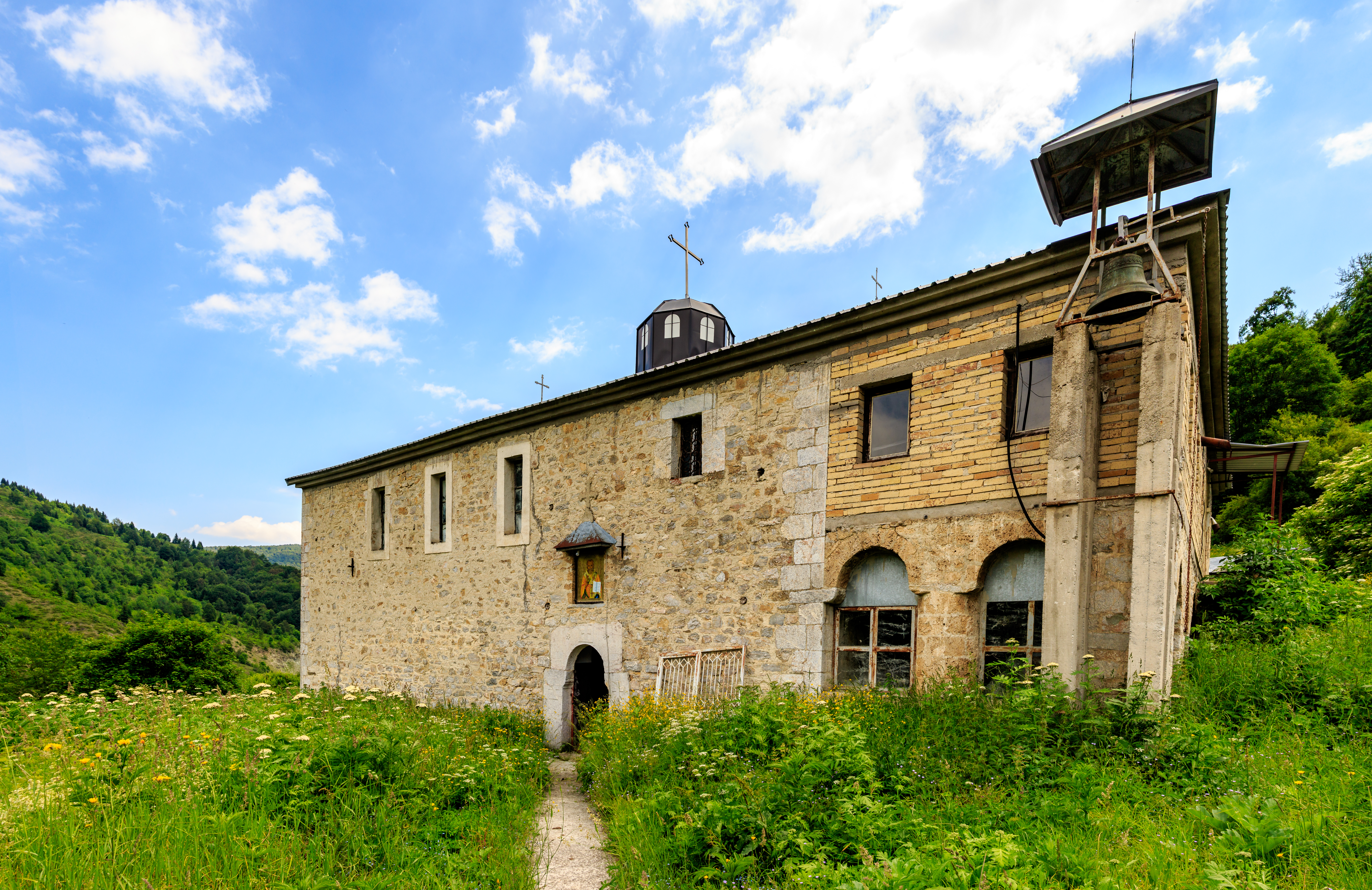
St. Nicholas church, Beličica

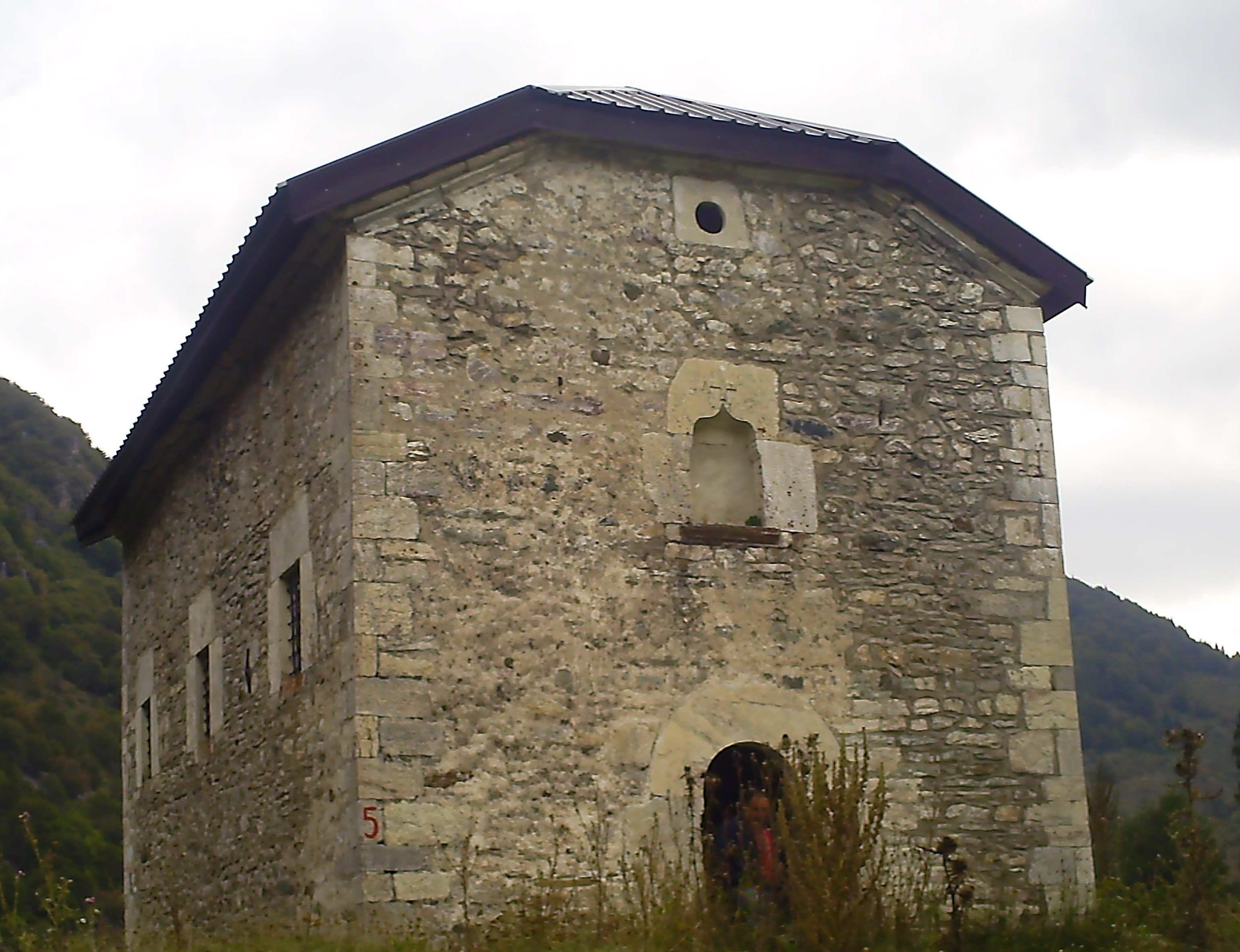
St Varvara church, Žužnje

== See also ==
- Upper Reka dialect
- Culture of Albania
- Macedonian culture (Slavic)
