= Shqypeja e Shqypenis =

Albanian language twice-monthly newspaper

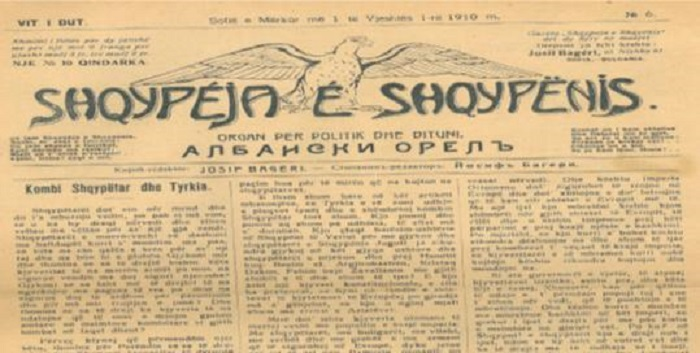
- General manager: Josif Bageri
- Founded: May 18, 1909
- Ceased publication: 1911
- Language: Albanian, Bulgarian
- Headquarters: Sofia
- Country: Bulgaria

Shqypeja e Shqypenis ('Eagle of Albania') was an Albanian language twice-monthly newspaper published from Sofia, Bulgaria 1909–1911. The first issue was published on May 18 (June 1), 1909. Josif Bageri was the manager of the publication. It covered political, social, cultural and literary affairs.

Shqypeja e Shqypenis used Gheg orthography. Parts of the newspaper was published in Bulgarian language. The newspaper issues had four pages, format varied between 24x31.2 centimetres to 25x41.6 cm.

On October 5, 1910, the spelling of the name was changed to Shqiponja e Shqipenis. In total 42 issues of the newspaper were published.
