= Ardian Vehbiu =

Albanian author and translator (born c. 1959)

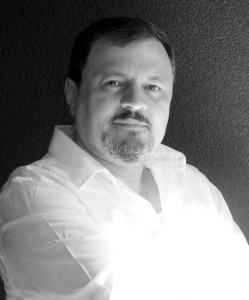
- Vehbiu in 2015
- Born: 22 August 1959 (age 67); Tirana, Albania
- Occupations: Writer, Translator
- Writing career
- Language: Albanian, English, Italian and French
- Website: peizazhe.com

Ardian Vehbiu (born August 22, 1959) is an Albanian author and translator. He was born in Tirana, Albania in 1959 and now resides in New York City. He is the author of 12 non-fiction and fiction books, as well as of a number of research papers in linguistics and semiotics. He is the winner of the 2009 "Gjergj Fishta" national non-fiction award with "Shqipja totalitare", (2009), as well as the winner of the 2014 "Ardian Klosi" non-fiction award, with "Sende që nxirrte deti", (2013).

His writing is featured regularly in the Albanian press and has been translated in Italian, English and Romanian. He has also translated several works from Albanian into Italian, as well as from Italian, French and English into Albanian.

Vehbiu is the publisher and editor-in-chief of the Albanian cultural magazine Peizazhe të Fjalës (Landscapes of the Word) since 2007.

== Bibliography ==
=== Fiction ===
- Ndërhyrjet e zotit Shyti (Tiranë: Dudaj, 2016)
- BOLERO (Tiranë: Dudaj, 2015)
- Gjashtëdhjetë e Gjashtë Rrëfimet e Maks Gjerazit (Tiranë: K & B, 2010)

=== Non-fiction ===
- Sende Që Nxirrte Deti: Ese. (Tiranë: Dudaj, 2013)
- Kundër Purizmit: Polemikë (Tirane: Dudaj, 2012)
- Folklori i Elitave (Tiranë: Morava, 2009)
- Fraktalet e Shqipes: Rrëgjimi i Gjeometrive të Standardit (Tiranë: Çabej, 2007)
- Shqipja Totalitare: Tipare të Ligjërimit Publik në Shqipërinë e Viteve 1945-1990 (Tiranë: Çabej, 2007)
- Midis Zhgënjimit dhe Mitit: Realitete Amerikane (Tiranë: Max, 2007)
- Kuzhinat e Kujtesës: Ese Kritike II (Elbasan: Sejko, 2006)
- Zhargonet e Kombit: Ese Kritike I (Elbasan: Sejko, 2004)
- Kulla e Sahatit (Tiranë: K & B, 2003)
- La Scoperta Dell'Albania: Gli Albanesi Secondo i Mass Media (Co-written with Rando Devole, Milano, Paoline, 1996)
