= Josif Bageri =

Albanian writer and activist involved in the Albanian National Awakening

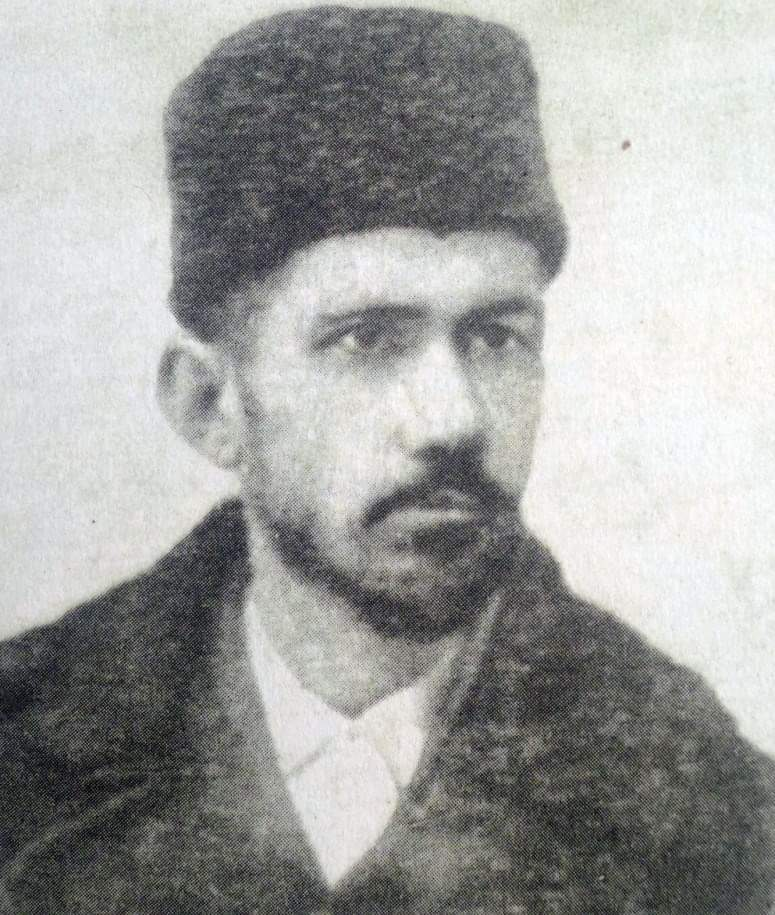
- Born: August 15, 1868; Nistrovë, Ottoman Empire
- Died: June 15, 1915 (aged 46); Pristina, Kingdom of Serbia
- Occupations: Writer, teacher
- Writing career
- Movement: National Renaissance of Albania

Josif Jovan Bageri (August 15, 1868 – June 15, 1915) was an Albanian rilindas, poet and teacher. He advocated for the education of Albanians in Upper Reka.

== Life ==
He was born into an Albanian-Orthodox family in Nistrovë in the region of Upper Reka, Ottoman Empire (now North Macedonia). In 1887, he migrated to Sofia where he worked as a shoemaker and became involved with the Albanian national movement. In January 1893, he founded the cultural association Dëshira, which worked for the development of the Albanian language and Albanian schools. His son Kristo, who also was involved in the Albanian national awaking, was murdered by the VMRO in 1906.

In 1908, due to the changes in the Ottoman Empire, schools with Albanian language were established, and Bageri founded such a school in his native village. In the years 1909–1911, Bageri published a bilingual magazine Shqypeja e Shqypenis in Sofia, which addressed political and educational issues. In November 1910, together with Kosta Trebicka, he organized a protest of the Albanian diaspora in Sofia against the crimes committed by the Turks in Kosovo. After the announcement of the Albanian Declaration of Independence, Bageri came to Durrës, where he published the weekly Ushtimi Krujës. The magazine was published in the years 1913–1914 in Albanian and French . He died in Pristina, during a trip to Sofia.

== Legacy ==
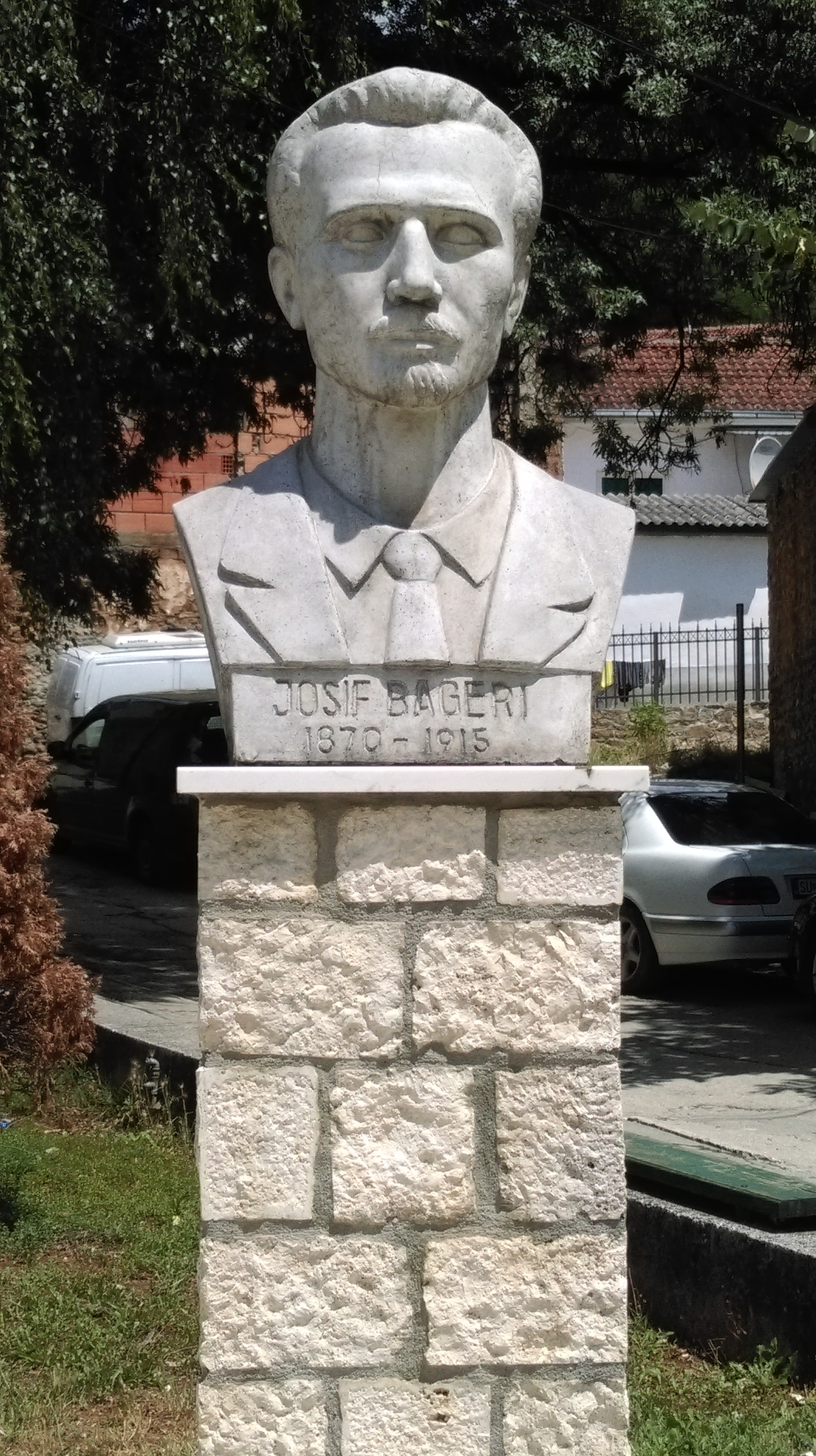
Bust of Josif Bageri in Debar

In North Macedonia, there is an association named after Bageri, which is engaged in the promotion of his works among Albanians living in this country. A street in Peshkopi and Debar bear Bageri's name, his bust is located in Debar and on one of the memorial bridges in Skopje.

== Sources ==
- Elsie, Robert (2012). A Biographical Dictionary of Albanian History. New York: I.B. Tauris. pp. 23–24. ISBN 9781780764313.
