= Nistrovo =

Nistrovo Нистрово Nistrovë
- Village
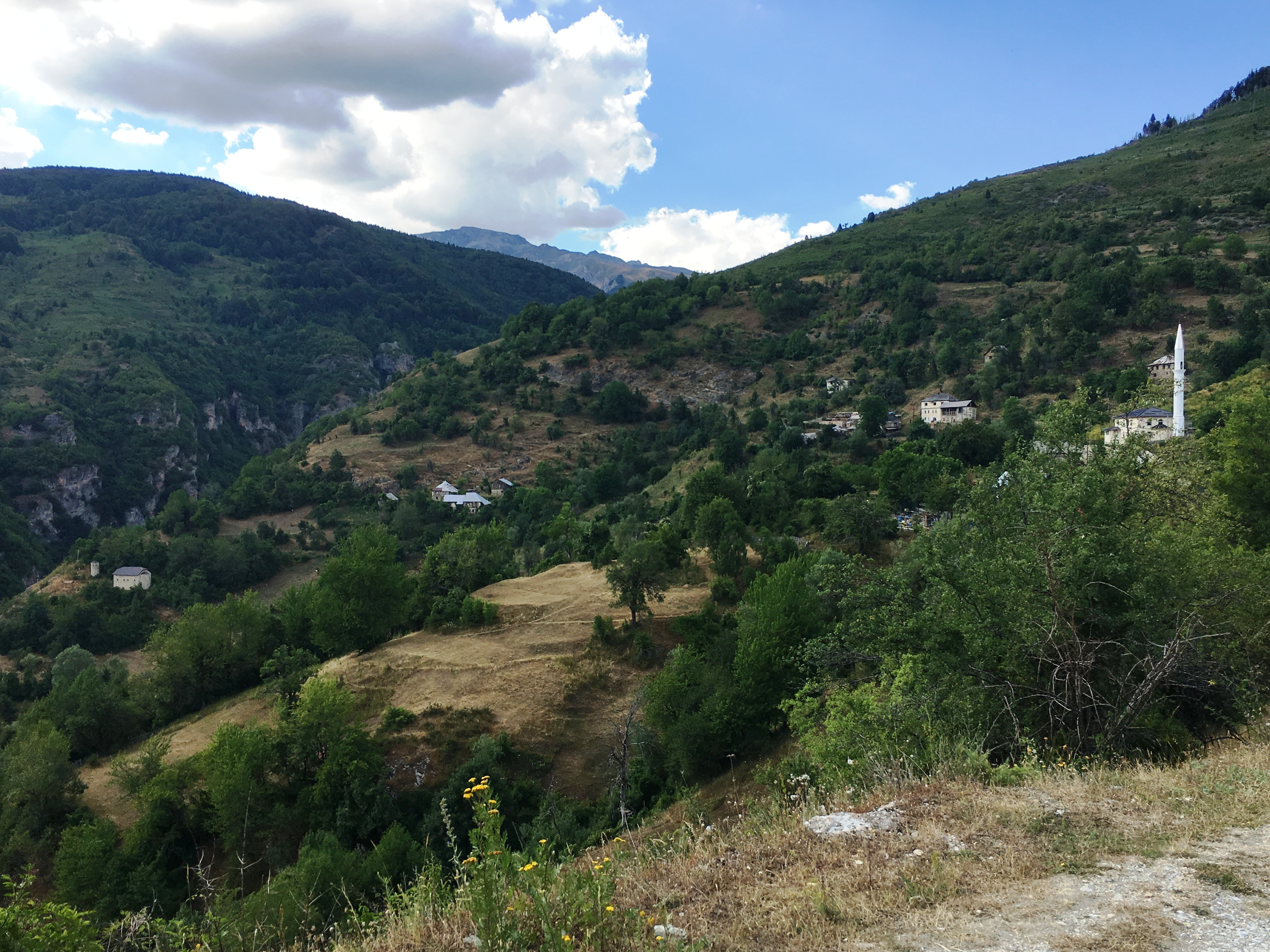
- Panoramic view of the village Nistrovo

- Location within North Macedonia
- Coordinates: 41°44′N 20°38′E
- Country: North Macedonia
- Region: Polog
- Municipality: Mavrovo and Rostuša

Population (2021)
  - Total: 32
- Time zone: UTC+1 (CET)
  - Summer (DST): UTC+2 (CEST)
- Car plates: GV
- Website: .

Nistrovo (Macedonian: Нистрово, Albanian: Nistrovë) is a village in the municipality of Mavrovo and Rostuša, North Macedonia.

== Demographics ==
Nistrovo is recorded in the Ottoman defter of 1467 as a village in the ziamet of Reka which was under the authority of Karagöz Bey. The village had a total of eight households and the anthroponymy attested depicted is majority Albanian in character, with a minority being Slavic (e.g Kol Bardhi, Gjon Pashajët, Gjore Ivret, Stepan Kovaç etc). In the 1519 census, the village was recorded under the name Nstrovë and had 36 Christian families. In 1583, the village of Nishtrovë recorded 70 Christian households and 13 bachelors, paid the timar 3,665 akçe per year and had three mills that worked all year round. The anthroponyms attested exhibited an Albanian and Albanian-Slavic character: (e.g Miho Dade, Gjoni son of Miho, Petri Boshko, Kolo Pavlo, Gjin Krojçe, Pavle Deno, Gjin Stamati, Petro Stamati, Gjin Dane (Dabe), pop Nikolla, Pop Jovani, Gjin Jovko, Gjin Nikkola, Koço Drenko, Todor Petri, Nikolla Bogdani, Velçko Gjin, Hran Gjin, Mile Geno, Leko Gjorgji, Gjin Petri, Jefçe Nikolla, etc.).

In statistics gathered by Vasil Kanchov in 1900, the village of Nistrovo was inhabited by 150 Christian Albanians and 230 Muslim Albanians.

Nistrovo is one of the few Upper Reka villages with a resident population in the 2010s. In the 2010s, the village consisted of two neighbourhoods, one populated by Muslim Albanians with a mosque and the other by Albanian-speaking Orthodox Christians, who in the modern period self-identified as Macedonians. The Orthodox population for several decades migrated from the village to various urban centres and come back to Nistrovo in the summer. Most homes in the Orthodox neighbourhood are abandoned and the restoration of the Orthodox church occurred in the early 2010s.

According to the 2002 census, the village had a total of 121 inhabitants. Ethnic groups in the village include:

- Albanians 121

As of the 2021 census, Nistrovo had 32 residents with the following ethnic composition:

- Albanians 27
- Persons for whom data are taken from administrative sources 4
- Others 1

== People ==
- Josif Bageri (15 August 1868 – 15 June 1915), educator, poet and Albanian nationalist figure.
