= Bibaj, Mavrovo i Rostuše =

Bibaj
- Village
- Бибај
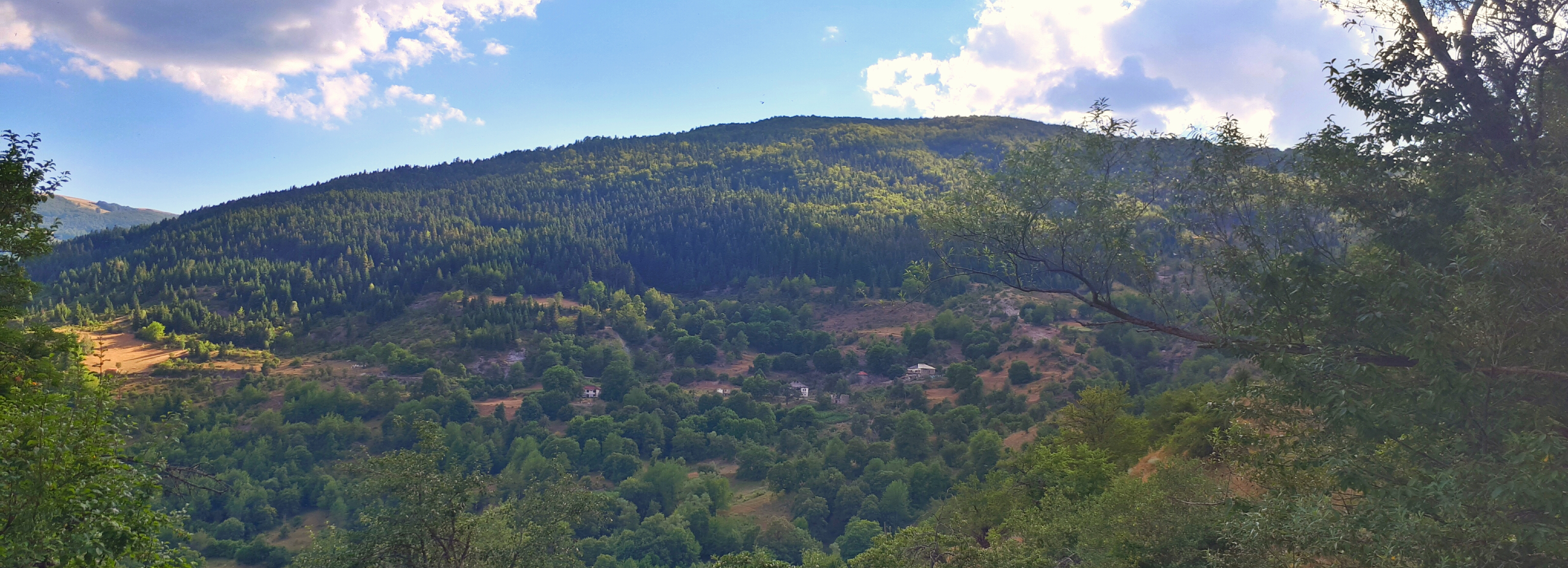
- Panoramic view of the village from nearby Nistrovo

- Location within North Macedonia
- Coordinates: 41°44′N 20°38′E
- Country: North Macedonia
- Region: Polog
- Municipality: Mavrovo and Rostuša

Population (2021)
  - Total: 0
- Time zone: UTC+1 (CET)
  - Summer (DST): UTC+2 (CEST)
- Car plates: GV
- Website: .

Bibaj (Macedonian: Бибај, Albanian: Bibaj) is a village in the municipality of Mavrovo and Rostuša, North Macedonia.

== Demographics ==
According to the 2002 census, the village had a total of 31 inhabitants. Ethnic groups in the village include:

- Albanians 31

As of the 2021 census, Bibaj had zero residents.
