= Žužnje =

Žužnje Жужње Zhuzhnjë
- Village
- Location within North Macedonia
- Coordinates: 41°45′N 20°38′E
- Country: North Macedonia
- Region: Polog
- Municipality: Mavrovo and Rostuša

Population (2021)
  - Total: 6
- Time zone: UTC+1 (CET)
  - Summer (DST): UTC+2 (CEST)
- Car plates: GV
- Website: .

Žužnje (Macedonian: Жужње, Albanian: Zhuzhnjë) is a village in the municipality of Mavrovo and Rostuša, North Macedonia.

== Culture ==
Žužnje, a village of Upper Reka became renown for its handicrafts and traditional women's costumes that used silver beads and filigree making them some of the most picturesque in the region.

== Demographics ==
Žužnje (Zhuzheli) is recorded in the Ottoman defter of 1467 as a village in the ziamet of Reka which was under the authority of Karagöz Bey. The village had a total of 5 households and the anthroponymy attested depicts an almost exclusively Albanian character, with only a single case of Slavicisation in the case of Gjon Gjergjeviqi. In 1519, the village counted 14 Christian households. In the 1583 census, the village of Žužnje paid the timarli 1000 akçe and counts 20 Christian households and 7 bachelors and had 1 mill. The Christian anthroponyms recorded were Albanian and mixed Slavic-Albanian in character. Muslim athroponyms also appear: (e.g Ali Stojan, Ivan Barde (Bazde), Jançe Gjon, Nikolla Gjon, Kojo Jan, Konstantin Janak, Petro Nikolla, Hasan Meritor, Marko Çoço, Kojo Boshko, Jovan Boshko, Gjon Kojo, Gjin Kojo, Stepan Kojo, Jovan Pejo etc).

In statistics gathered by Vasil Kanchov in 1900, the village of Žužnje was inhabited by 150 Christian Albanians and 160 Muslim Albanians.

As of the 2021 census, Žužnje had 6 residents with the following ethnic composition:

- Albanians 6

According to the 2002 census, the village had a total of 8 inhabitants. Ethnic groups in the village include:

- Albanians 8

According to the 1942 Albanian census, Žužnje was inhabited by 116 Muslim Albanians.
