= Mijaks =

Ethnographic group of North Macedonia

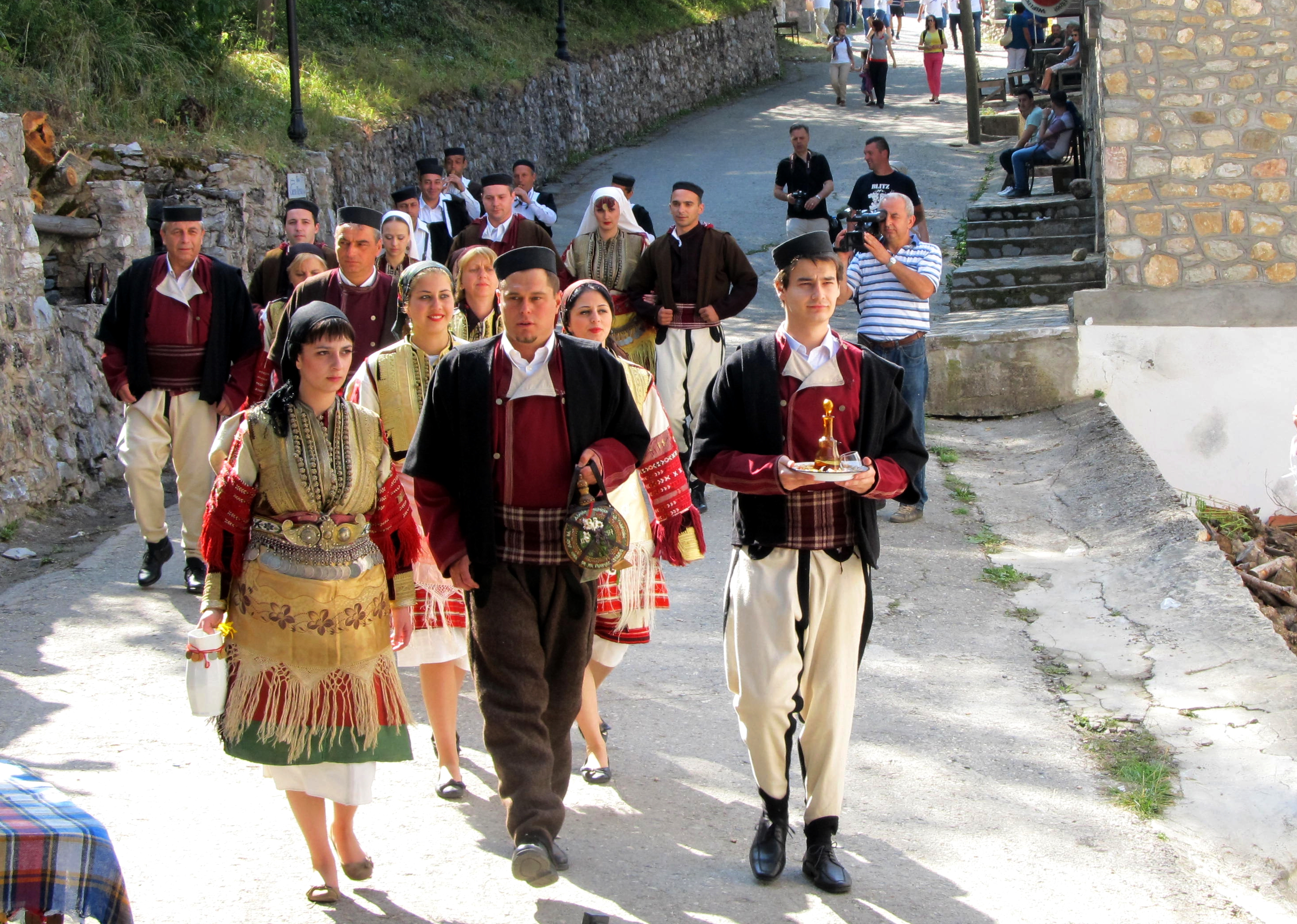
Galičnik Wedding Festival.

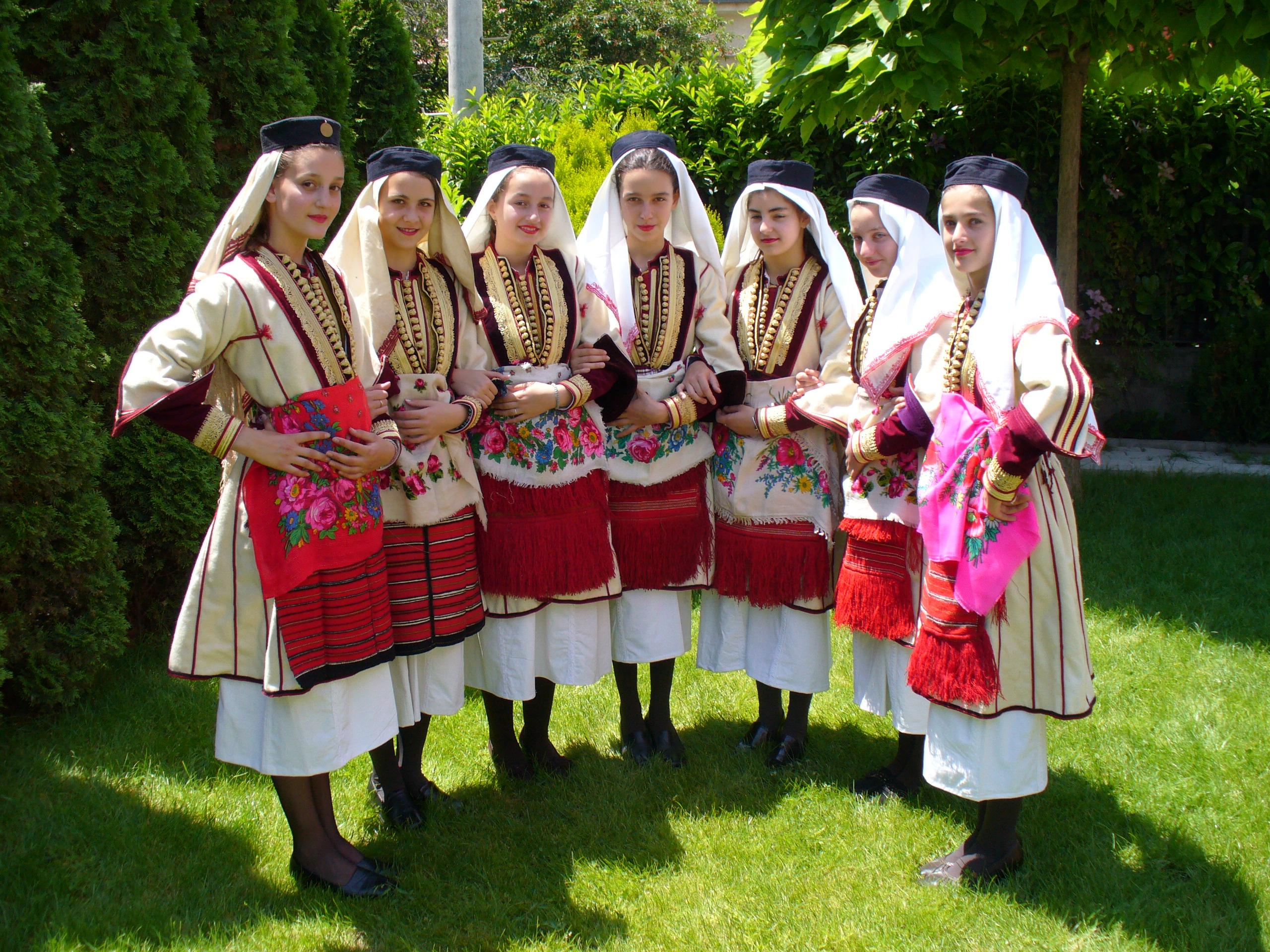
Girls in Mijak dress.

Mijaks (Macedonian: Мијаци, romanized: Mijaci) are an ethnographic group of Macedonians who live in the Lower Reka region which is also known as Mijačija (Macedonian: Мијачија), along the Radika river, in western North Macedonia, numbering 30,000–60,000 people. The Mijaks practise predominantly animal husbandry, and are known for their ecclesiastical architecture, woodworking, iconography, and other rich traditions, as well as their characteristic Galičnik dialect of Macedonian. The main settlement of the Mijaks is Galičnik.

== Settlements ==
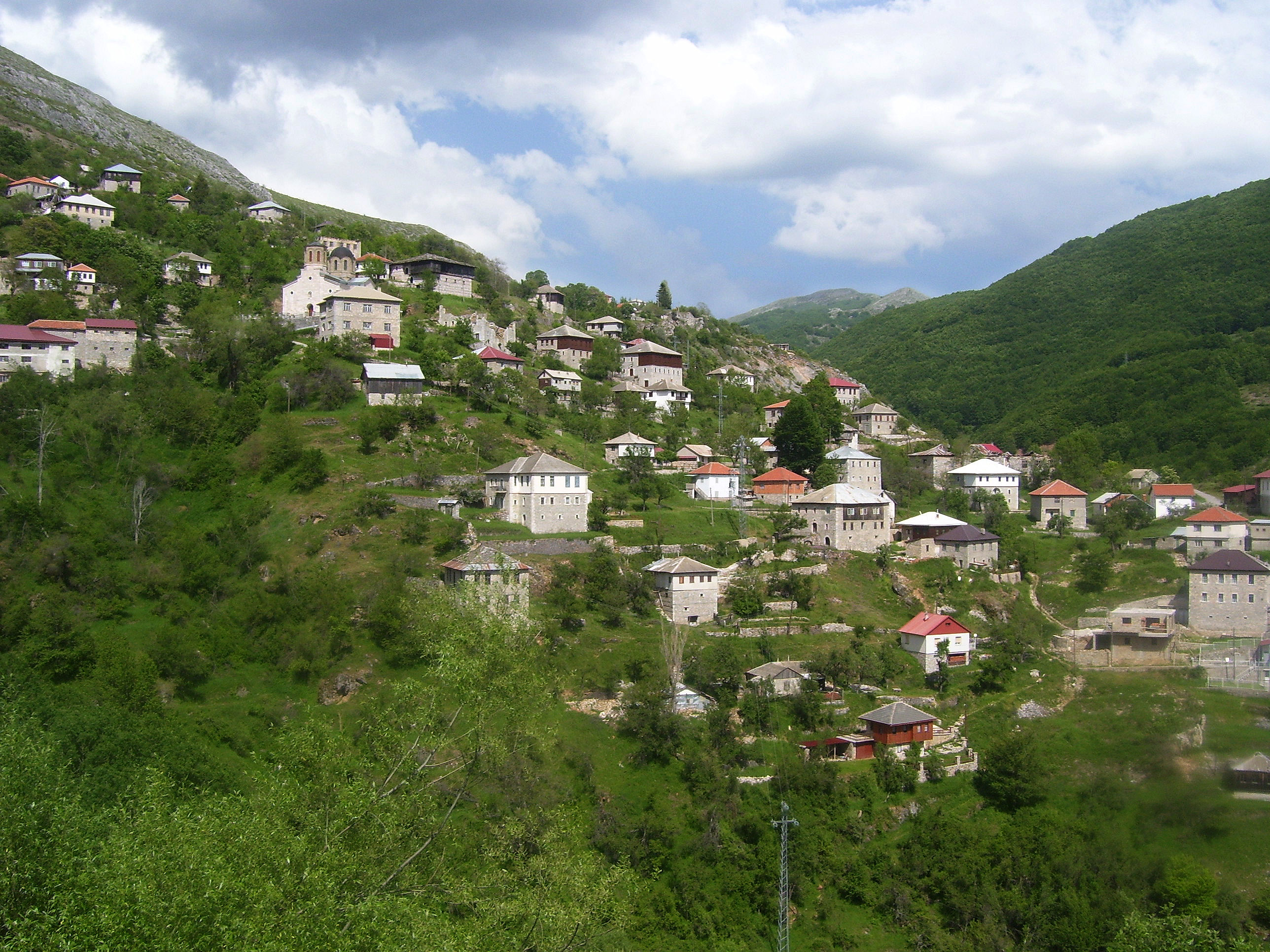
Mijak architecture.

The Mijaks have traditionally occupied the Mala Reka region along with the Torbeš, Macedonian-speaking Muslims. The area including the Bistra mountain and Radika region has been termed Mijačija (Мијачија). To the east is the ethnographic region of the Brsjaks.

The Mijaks traditionally inhabited the villages of Galičnik, Lazaropole, Tresonče, Selce, Rosoki, Sušica, Gari and Osoj. However, the majority of Mijak villages are uninhabited as most of the inhabitants left during the 20th century. The north-western quarter of Kruševo was populated by Mijaks.

== History ==
Historical flag of the Mijaks

=== Middle Ages–18th century ===
Their ethnonym is unclear. There is a theory that the Mijaks were the first to permanently settle this area; they found mostly Vlachs, who seem to have not been permanently settled; the Mijaks pushed the Vlachs out of the pasture lands, while some of the Vlachs were assimilated. According to another theory the Mijaks are the remains of an old Slavic tribe that inhabited the area of the Salonica field and was engaged mostly in the cattle breeding. This theory is also confirmed by the legends for the founding of one of the most significant Mijak settlements as Galičnik.

The Brsjaks and Mijaks did not live geographically scattered prior to the Ottoman conquest.

A proportion of Mijaks converted to Islam during the 16th and 17th centuries, and they are known by the name Torbeši.

In the 18th century, the Mijaks had an armed conflict with the Islamized population regarding pasture lands.

=== 19th century ===
The Islamized population of Galičnik was re-Christianized in 1843.

Georgi Pulevski wrote about the places where the Mijaks were concentrated, their migrations and the Mijak region.

In 1822, an unpublished lexicographical work by Panajot Ginovski, "Mijački rečnik po našem govoru", was written, containing 20,000 words.

In the summer of 1875, referendum was held on the church affiliation of the Christians in Debar county (kaza). The majority supported the accession to the Bulgarian Exarchate. Only 2 villages and 20 houses in Debar supported the Patriarchate of Constantinople, perceived by local Bulgarians as Greek church.

This was made after the Principality of Bulgaria received most of the Macedonia region by the Ottoman Empire, and the earlier establishment and expansion of the Bulgarian Exarchate (February 28, 1870; in 1874, Skopje and Ohrid voted in favour of the Exarchate).

=== 20th century ===
During the Ilinden uprising in Kruševo (August 2–3, 1903), a known Mijak involved was Veljo Pecan. During the guerilla period, the Mijaks were divided into those that identified with Serbia and those that did with Bulgaria; one Serbian vojvoda was Doksim Mihailović from Galičnik, while the Bulgarian vojvods were under Maksim N. Bogoja. Tale Krastev, Ivan Pendarovski, Rade Yankulovski, Kiro Simonovski, Yanaki Tomov, Apostol Frachkovski etc.

== Culture ==
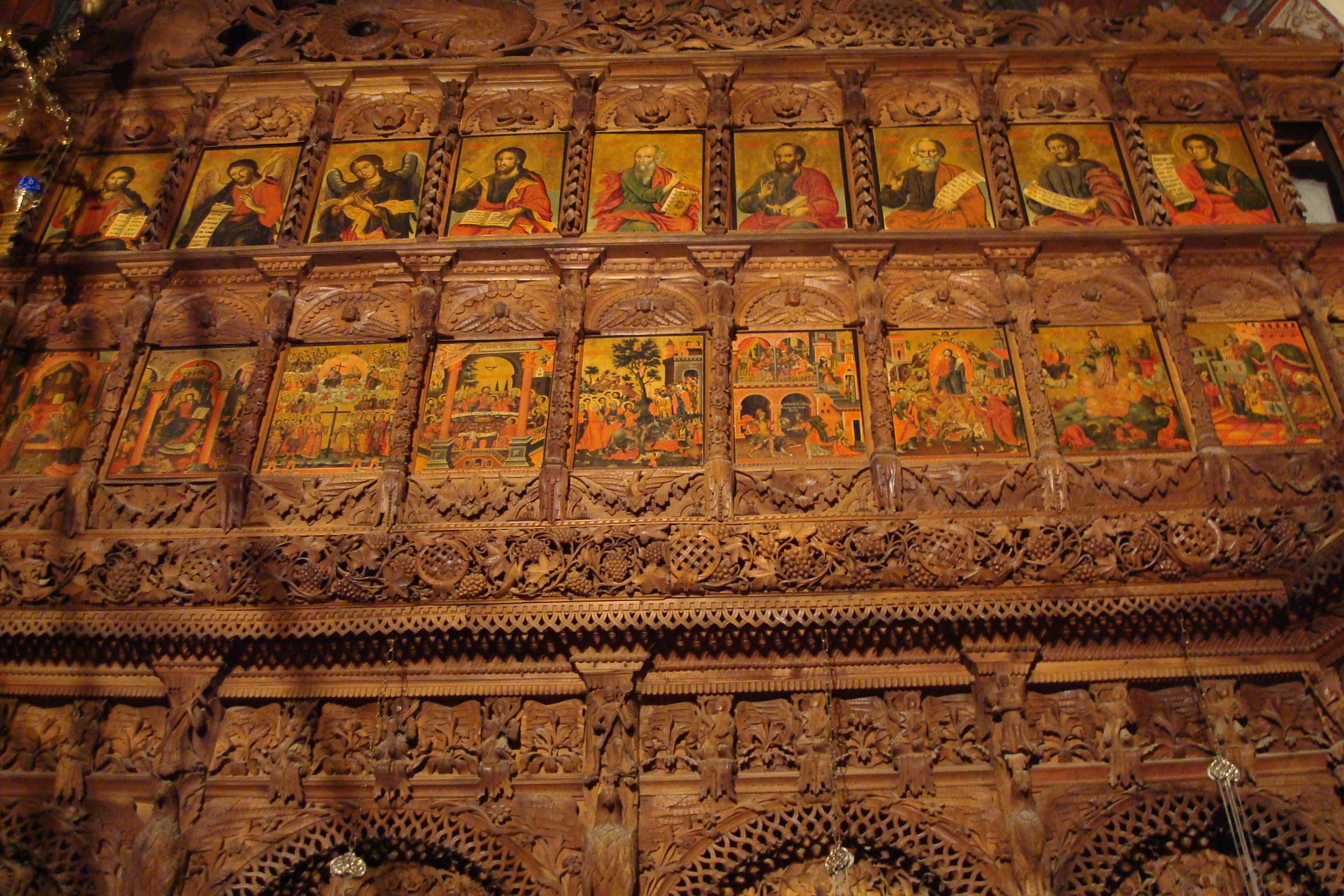
Intricate Mijak woodcarving in Saint Jovan Bigorski Monastery.

The Mijaks are well known for the extent to which old customs are preserved in their everyday life. The pečalba (seasonal work) was a deeply entrenched tradition of the Mijaks; males in their 20s would often leave the village for months, or even years, at a time, in order to work in more prosperous regions and create wealth for the family — this has contributed to the dispersion of Mijak families, with villages now deserted or sparsely populated.

Mijaks had mastered the craft of woodcarving, and for many years a wood carving school operated in the Mala Reka region. They were responsible for the intricate wood carving which is found inside the Saint Jovan Bigorski Monastery, which is considered to be the best in North Macedonia.

The Galičnik Wedding Festival (Галичка свадба) is the name of a traditional wedding and its characteristic ceremony, which is annually held on Petrovden (St. Peter feast day, 12 July), in which a couple is chosen to receive the wedding and be shown on national television. The Teškoto oro (lit. "the hard one"), a shepherd folk dance of the Mijaks, is one of the national dances of North Macedonia.

Some Mijaks believe that Skanderbeg, the Albanian military commander and national hero, hailed from Mijačija.

=== Architecture ===
Mijak architecture has become a defining factor in the culture of the Mijaks. The Mijaks were among the most skilled masons and they helped wealthy Aromanians develop Kruševo into a large, prosperous and beautiful city in the 18th century. Apart from some masons from the Kriva Palanka region, they were the most proficient in all Macedonia and the Balkans. The Saint Jovan Bigorski Monastery is built in the Mijak style.

=== Language ===
The Mijaks traditionally speak the Galičnik dialect and Reka dialect. Typical characteristics of the "Mijački govor" (Macedonian: Мијачки говор), Mijak speech, include:

Mijak speech	Standard Macedonian	English	Notes
žamija	džamija	mosque	reduced use of the phenome "dž" to only "ž"
roka	raka	hand	the Big Yus is pronounced as a "o" and not an "a" as in Standard Macedonian
tužda/tuža	tugja	foreign	use of the phenome "ž" or "žd" in place of the standard Macedonian "gj"
trebuvad/trebit	treba	need	use of the suffix "-t" or "-d" for third person singular
stavajed	stavaat	they place	use of the suffix "-ajed" for third person plural
glagolj	zbor	word	from Proto-Slavic *glagoliti ("to speak"); cf. Glagolitic alphabet

Their speech include peculiarities (in relation to standard Macedonian), such as ovde, onde, kode, koga, zašto, dojdi, etc.

=== Ethnography ===
Mijaks have been subject to ethnographic studies by Macedonian, Bulgarian and Serbian scholars. According to the 2002 census, in the Municipality of Mavrovo and Rostuša there were 4,349 Macedonians (50.46%), 2,680 Turks (31,10%), 1,483 Albanians (17.21%), and smaller numbers of Bosniaks (0.36%), Roma (0.12%), Serbs (0.07%) and others (0.68%); In the Municipality of Debar there were a total of 19,542 inhabitants, of which 11,348 Albanians, 3,911 Macedonians, 2,684 Turks, 1,080 Roma, 22 Serbs, 3 Bosniaks, 2 Vlachs and 492 others.

- In their works from the beginning of the 20th century, Bulgarian ethnographers Vasil Kanchov and Dimitar Michev describe the local Mijak population as Bulgarian. The researcher Georgi Traychev from Prilep also describes the Mijaks as part of the Bulgarian people, different from the other, neighboring ethnographic Bulgarian groups as the Brsjaks.

==== Genetic Studies ====
Zupan et al. (2020) examined samples from 44 Mijak males from Galičnik. In terms of Y-dna, Mijaks are located under haplogroups R1a-M458 (56.8%) and R1b-U106 (25%). Other haplogroups include G2a-P15 (11.4%) and E-M215 (4.5%). The high percentage of R1a-M458 among Mijaks associates them more closely with west Slavic groups who have a high frequency of R1a-M458, in particular Poles.

== Notable people ==
- Dimitrija Čupovski (1878–1940) textbook writer and lexicographer
- Ljubomir Frčkoski (born 12 December 1957, Skopje) politician, family from Galičnik
- Dame Gruev (1871–1906), revolutionary, one of the founders of the IMRO, born in Smilevo
- Golub Janić (1853–1918), politician, born in Mavrovo, family from Lazaropole
- Lazar Ličenoski (1901–1964) Macedonian painter, born in Galičnik
- Isaija Mažovski (1852–1926), painter and writer, born in Lazaropole
- Doksim Mihailović (1883–1912), Chetnik, born in Galičnik
- Josif Mihajlović Jurukovski (1887–1941), mayor of Skopje, born in Tresonče
- Risto Ognjanovikj-Lonoski (1870–1941), writer
- Georgi Pulevski (1817–1895), writer and revolutionary, born in Galičnik
- Aleksandar Sarievski (1922–2002), traditional singer, born in Galičnik
- Toma Smiljanić-Bradina (1888–1969), ethnographer, philologist, dramatist and publicist, born in Tresonče
- Damjan Stojanovski (born 1987, Skopje) basketball player, family from Rosoki
- Vojdan Stojanovski (born 1987, Skopje) basketball player, family from Rosoki
- Dičo Zograf (1819-1872), Icon painter, born in Tresonče
- Parteniy Zografski (1818–1876), cleric, born in Galičnik

== Sources ==
Books

- Bernath, Mathias; Nehring, Karl (1988). Osmanisches Reich, Makedonien, Albanien. München.
- Brkovski, Meletije (2009). Мијаци: приказна од западната страна. Vol. 1–3. Združenie Prijateli na Galičnik Ǵorǵi Puleski. ISBN 978-9989-9749-7-7.
- Bužaroski, Risto (1976). Galička povest. Naša kniga.
- Огњановиќ-Лоноски, Риста; Јашар-Настева, Оливера (2004). Галичник и Мијаците. Македонска академија на науките и уметностите. ISBN 978-9989-101-36-6.
- Todorovski, Gligor (1970). Malorekanskiot predel [Mala Reka area].
- Трайчев, Георги (1940). Книга за мияците [A Book about Mijaks].
- Naselja i poreklo stanovnistva. Vol. 20.
- Zupan, A; Matjašič, A; Grubelnik, G; Tasić, V (2020). "Mutations in Collagen Genes in the Context of an Isolated Population". Genes (Basel). 11 (11): 1377. doi:10.3390/genes11111377. PMC 7699876. PMID 33233744.

Journal

- Hoddinott, R. F. (September 1954). "The Tradition of Wood Carving in Macedonia". The Burlington Magazine. 96 (618): 278–283.
