= Dičo Zograf =

Mijak iconographer, fresco painter, and art school representative

- Дичо Зограф
- Born: Dimitar Krstev Dičov; 1819; Tresonče, Ottoman Empire (present day North Macedonia)
- Died: 1872 (aged 52–53)
- Other name: Dičo Krstev

Dimitar Krstev Dičov (Bulgarian: Димитър Кръстев Дичов, Macedonian: Димитар Крстев Дичов, Serbian: Димитар Крстевић), also known as Dičo Krstev (Дичо Крстев) and best known as Dičo Zograf (Дичо Зограф) (1819–1872) was a Mijak iconographer, fresco painter and a representative of the Debar Art School in the Balkans in the 19th century. He self-identified as a Bulgarian.

In his short life he painted more than 2,000 icons in Orthodox churches in then Ottoman Empire (today Albania, Greece, North Macedonia, Kosovo, Bulgaria, Serbia and possibly Bosnia). Zograf systematically worked on new iconostases, renewed and supplemented existing ones, painted separate wall surfaces with frescoes and worked on whole ensembles in newly built churches and monasteries. Characteristically, his icons were painted on a neutral, mostly golden background, and thus emphasized the spirituality of the characters of the saints. In addition to the icons, he wrote Erminija, an autobiography and exposition of his knowledge of iconography. Today, his works are highly valued in Serbia, North Macedonia, and Bulgaria.

== Biography ==
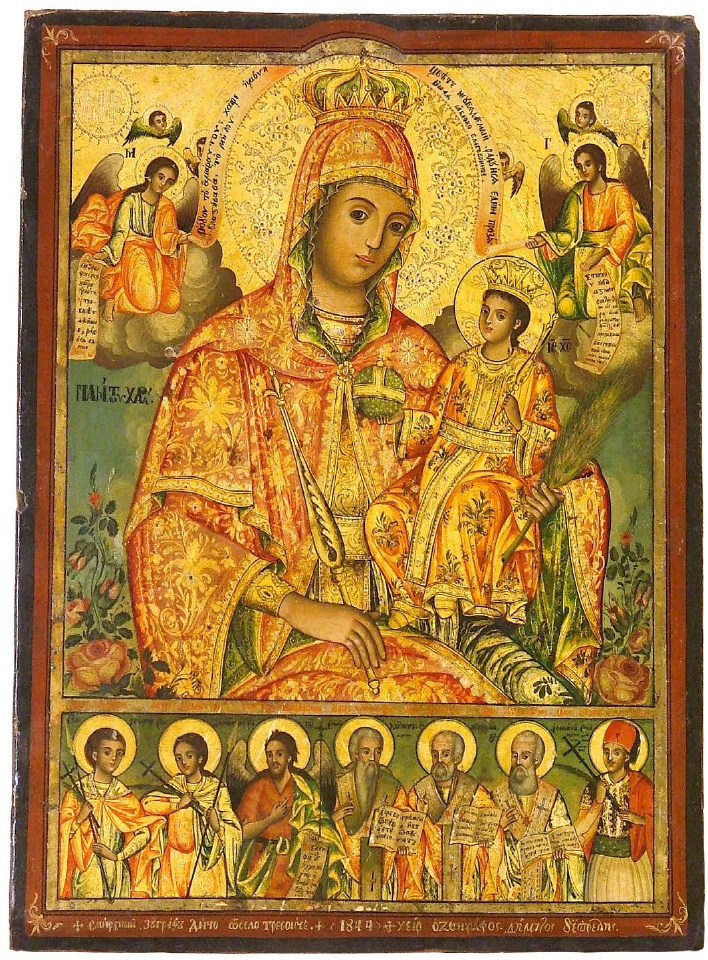
The icon of the Virgin Pantohara from 1844 is one of the earliest known works of Dičo Zograf

=== Origin and introduction to fresco painting ===
Zograf was born in the neighborhood of Lekovci in the village Tresonče in the Mijak region of Macedonia. His parents gave him the name Dimitar, and from his father, Krste, he got his last name - Krstev. When Dimitar was little he found out that he had another father, but he had father died when Zograf was one year old, and his mother remarried in the neighborhood of Lekovci, in Tresonče. His father, Krste Perkov was a primarily a woodcarver. When Zograf grew up, his father took him with his woodcarving group. Zograf was not interested in woodcarving, so he increasingly stared at the painters that his father often saw and made friends with.

He worked in many churches, including the frescoes in the monastery Saint Jovan Bigorski, the church Saint Gjorgji Pobedonosec in the village Rajčica as well as the iconostasis of the church Saint Nikola Gerakomija in Ohrid, from 1848 until 1869

There were many painters in the Bigorski Monastery at that time and Zograf left his father to study with them. The painters in the monastery, who had perfected painting in Mount Athos, showed him the basics of painting. Zograf learned the most about painting from master Mihail from Samarina. At first, the apprentices, including Dičo Zograf, drew the first layers of the icons, and at the end, the masters drew the last shadows and details.

Zograf married at the age of 20. He had seven sons and one daughter. Zograf died at the age of 54, in 1873.

== Works ==
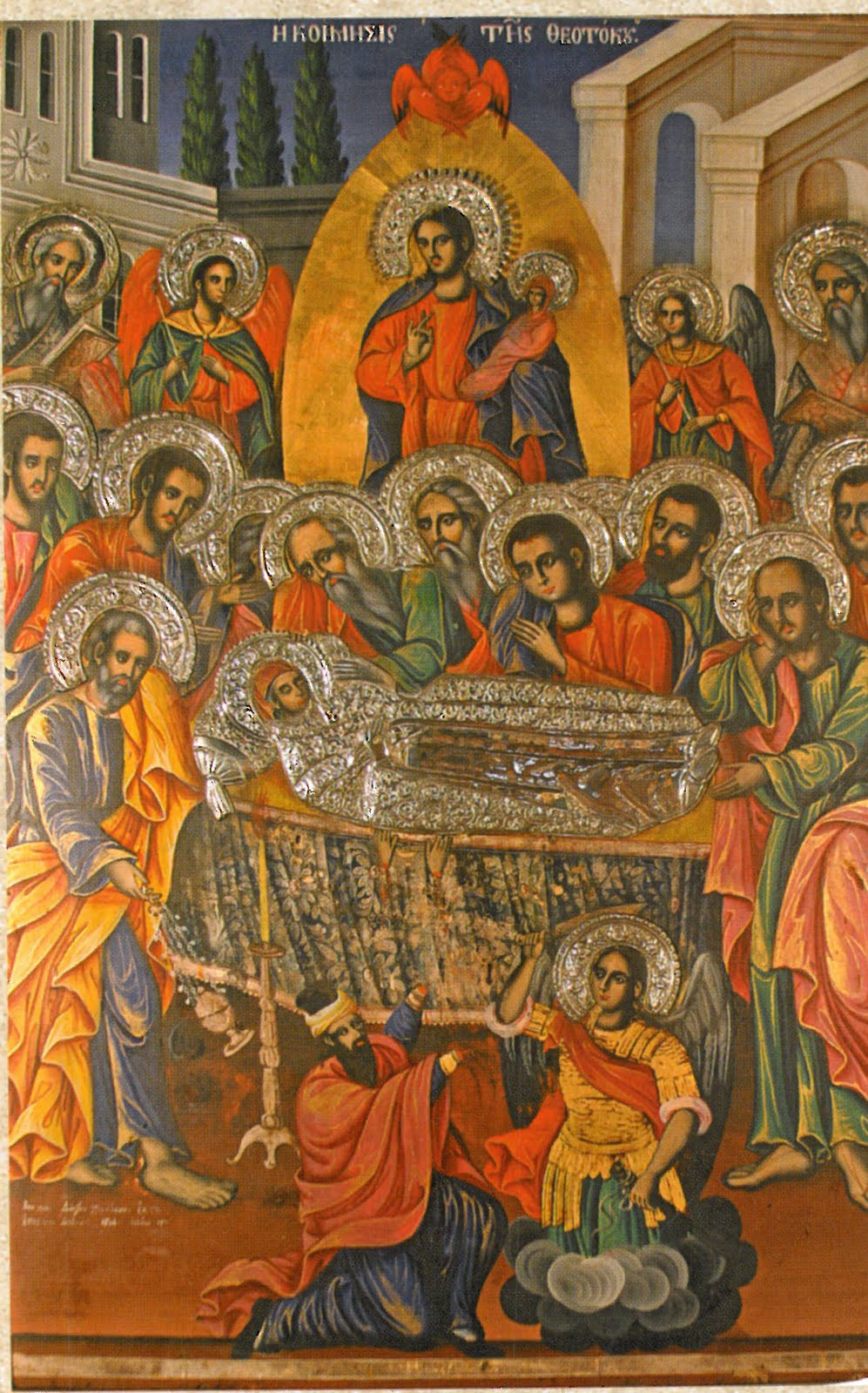
Icon „Assumption of the Virgin“ in Epanomi, 1866

Zograf was an important painter, who in a short period of time painted more than 2,000 icons for the needs of the Orthodox churches, everywhere in North Macedonia, Bulgaria, Serbia and Greece. After much work in Bigorski Monastery, in 1835 Zograf was offered to lead a small group, which was to go to the churches and monasteries in Aegean Coast. He accepted the offer and with the group they passed a large part of what is today Greek Macedonia and painted many icons and frescoes. He painted his first complete painting while he was in Drama. Afterwards, he went to Skopje and painted just over 50 icons for the iconostasis of the church "Holy Mother of God". From 1844 to 1845 he painted on the churches and monasteries of Skopska Crna Gora in the village of Kučevište. In 1844 he returned to the Bigorski Monastery where in the next four years he painted several throne icons. He painted Jesus Christ, Holy Mother of God, Saint John the Baptist and Saint George Demetrius. After that he worked on a large order for the church of Saint Georgia in the village Banjane (1845/46). He also painted the icons Holy Mother of God Hodegetria, Saint John Pretecha and Council of the Holy Apostles in the church of Saints Peter and Paul in Tresonče, and in the following year, the icons Saint Nicholas the Wonderworker, Saint Three Hierarchs, as well as the icon Saint Athanasius. In the same year he painted other icons for the temple in Tresonče, such as the icons of Holy Sunday and Saint Petka, and in 1847 he painted the icon of Saint Archangel Michael, with the help of Petre Pačar, who was signed on the icon as a student of Zograf.

From 1847 to 1849 he worked in Tresonče. There he painted the icons: Tomino infidelity, Birth of Christ, Baptism of Christ, Birth of the Holy Mother of God, Saint Panteleimon and Tryphon, Saint Kuzman and Damian, Transfiguration of Christ, Introduction of the Most Holy Mother of God in the temple, Saint Saint George and Demetrius, Saint Constantine and Helena, Saint Saint Eustachius and Julian and Descent of the Holy Spirit. A particularly successful work is the biography of the large iconostasis cross in the large Tresonče church, which he completed in 1854. He worked on the painting of the church in Tresonče from 1844 to 1854. At the same time in the autumn of 1849 he went to Vevčani where he made the icon Holy Mother of God with Christ, the next year he was in the villages of Goreneka Sence and Kičinica, and then in Ohrid where in the Church of the Holy Mother of God Kamenska he painted the same icon as the icon in Vevčani. In Ohrid in two years he painted about 40 icons, among which was the icon Saint Vrači the Great in the Church of the Holy Mother in Ohrid. In these years Zograf managed to use the most of his creative possibilities. In the following years he painted the following significant icons: The iconostasis in the Church of Saint Dimitrija in the village Volkovija, which he painted in 1852, the iconostasis in the Church of Saint Nicholas in the monastery in the village Ljubanci in 1853, in the Church of Saint Nicholas in Kumanovo in 1856, in the Church of St. Ilija in the village Kadino in 1857, Saint Marina Church in village Zubovce in 1859. At the end in 1859 he went to Serbia, to the city of Vranje where he painted in the churches Holy Trinity Church, and in 1860 and 1861 Zograf was again in what is today North Macedonia and painted Saint Constantine and Helena, Saint Bogorodica in the Church of the Holy Mother of God in Skopje, and then he was in Ohrid where he worked in the temples Saint Nikola Gerakomija, Saint Bogorodica Čelnica, Saint Bogorodica Kamenska, Saint Bogorodica Bolnicka, Church of St. Mary Peribleptos, and in Saint Demetrius. During these years, Zograf painted hundreds and hundreds of icons, when there were many people who wanted to draw saints.

From 1862 Zograf shifted the focus to Ohrid where he became one of the most sought after icon painters. During this period, Zograf worked on icons and frescoes for the Orthodox churches in Ohrid, mostly restoring the older iconostases and replicating the external ones. However, his assistants participated in the final works which bettered the quality of artistic performance. In 1867 he worked on the iconostasis in the church of Saint Nicholas in Vevčani, and his son Avram, started with fresco painting of the same church and finished in 1879.

The Research Center for Cultural Heritage "Cvetan Grozdanov" (ICCN) at MANU, through its field research, discovered works by Zograf in Kosovo, Greece, in several churches around Thessaloniki, and also in Albania, in the churches in Elbasan. In this way, a precise and complete catalogue of the discovered and identified icons was established.

Since the early 2000s, a large part of the cultural wealth and heritage of North Macedonia is a target of thievery, from which Zograf's icons have not been spared.

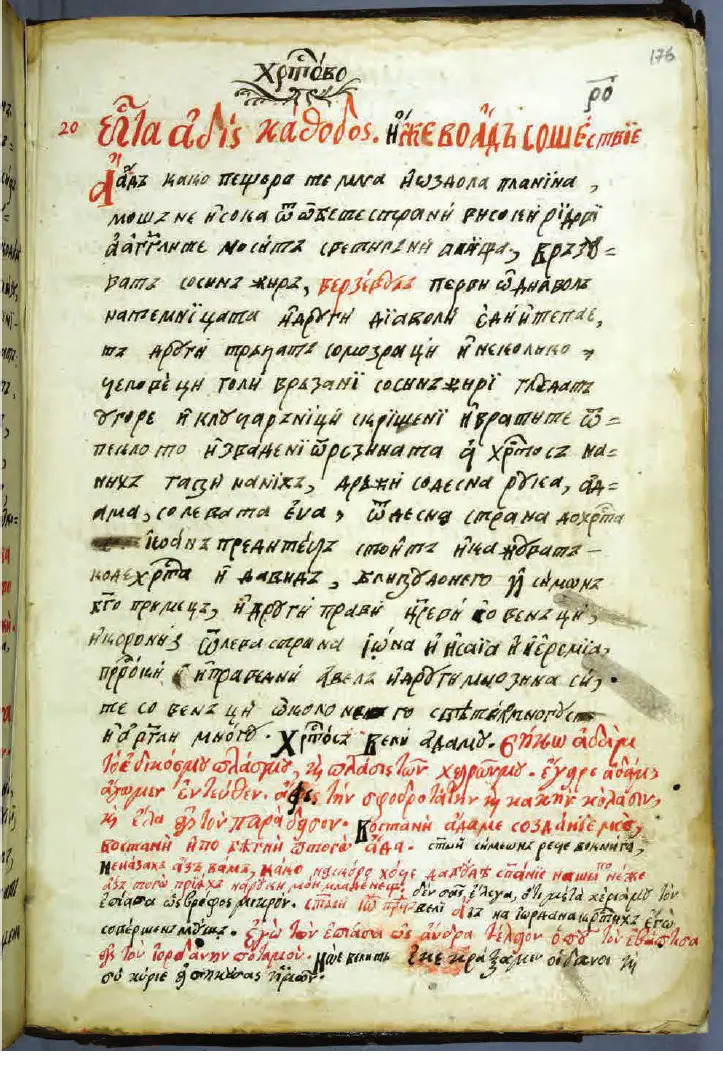
Erminija of Dičo Zograf kept in the Center for Slavic-Byzantine Studies Professor Ivan Duychev. Page 176a with a description of the scene "Descent into Hell", 1844.

== Famous works ==
- 1844 in Bigorski Monastery: "Jesus Christ"; "Holy Mother of God"; "St. John the Baptist"
- 1845 "Saint Peter and Paul" "Holy Mother of God Hodegetria"; "St. John the Forerunner"; "Council of the Holy Apostles"
- 1847 "Saint Peter and Paul" "Saint Archangel Michael"
- 1847 - 1849 in the church in Tresonče: "Tomino infidelity"; "Birth of Christ"; "Saint Panteleimon and Tryphon"; "Transfiguration of Christ"; "Saint George and Demetrius"; "Descent of the Holy Spirit"
- 1849 in Vevčani: "Holy Mother of God with Christ"
- 1851 in Ohrid: "Holy Mother of God"; "Great Healers Great"
- 1860 - 1861 in Skopje: "Holy Mother of God"; "Saint Saint Constantine and Helena"; "Holy Mother of God"
- 1865 in Epanomi, Thessaloniki: "Assumption of the Most Holy Mother of God"
- 1867 - the throne Icons "GIH-Hierarch"; "Most Holy Mother of God"; "Saint John the Baptist"; "Saint Nicholas"; "Ascension"; "Transfiguration"; "Saint Naum from Ohrid" were made in the church of "Saint Nicholas" in Vevčani.

== Writings ==
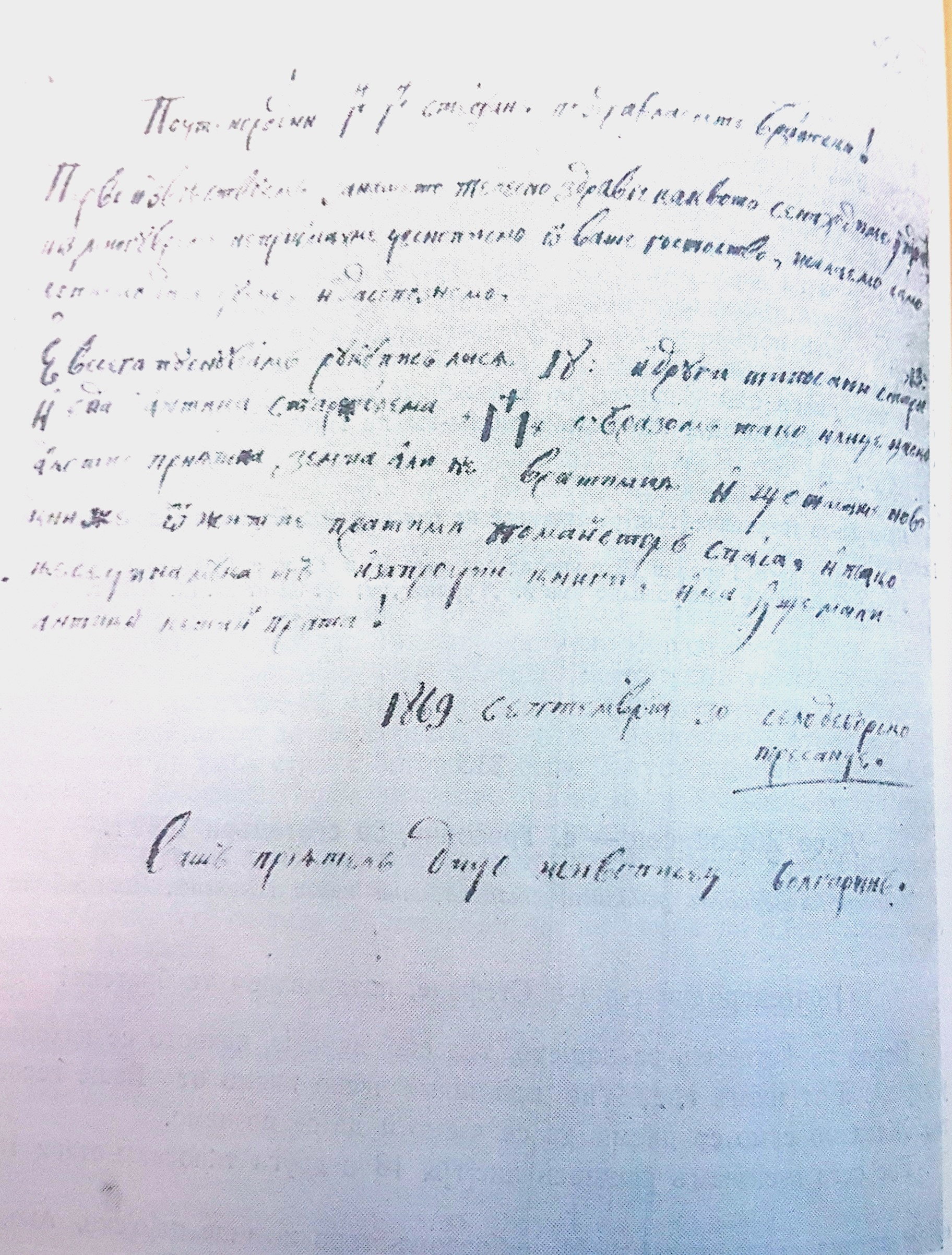
Letter sent to Stjepan Verković in September 1869, where the Zograf signed himself as Bulgarian painter. From the letter is clear that he was asked to hand out manuscripts and old books that he could find in the churches. Verković, for his part, provided him with printed biographies of Saints.

Apart from being a noted icon and fresco painter, Zograf was also a teacher of the famous Maksim Nenov, Blaže Damjanov, Isaija Mažovski, his son Avram, the son of the painter Petre Pačar, Gligorie and others. Zograf left a biographical record of his life, family and work and two guides to icon painting in manuscript form. The first one is kept in the Professor Ivan Duychev Center of Slavic-Byzantine Studies in Sofia. It is an original work written around 1835 - 1839, published in modern Bulgarian in 1976, by Asen Vasiliev. The second guide, written around 1830–1850, is currently stored in the Bulgarian National Historical Museum in Sofia with the code "MIS 1286". It is a translation from Greek, and is of less interest. In the introduction Zograf described the language in which he wrote as Slavic one and Bulgarian dialect. In his writings he described himself as Bulgarian painter.

== Commemoration ==
Zograf has been a subject of various scientific studies, exhibitions and commemorations organized in North Macedonia and abroad. In Tresonče, a commemorative room has been opened in honor of him, with the aim to educate the public on his work. The bike race "Memorial Dičo Zograf" is also named after him.
