= Melnica, Prilep =

Coordinates: 41°10′05″N 21°46′55″E

Melnica Мелница
- Village
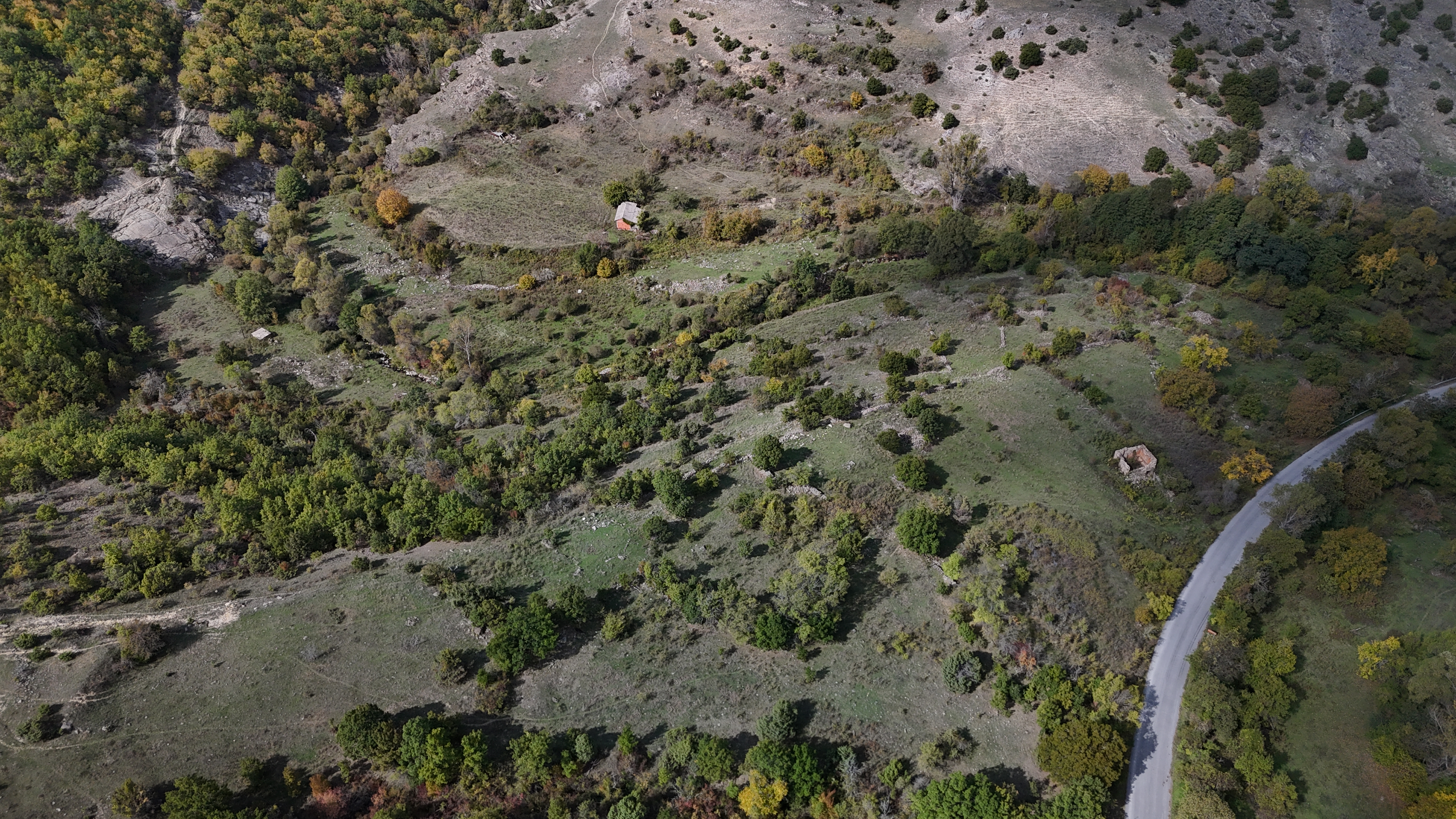
- Air view of the location of the former village
- Interactive map of Melnica
- Country: North Macedonia
- Municipality: Prilep
- Elevation: 700 m (2,300 ft)

Population (2002)
  - Total: 0
- Time zone: UTC+1 (CET)

Melnica is a former village in Municipality of Prilep, North Macedonia. There are no traces of the village today except for the St. Eliyah Monastery, located 500 meters south. This monastery was built in 1872 and had detailed frescoes painted on its interior walls and the domed ceiling in 1881. The frescoes were painted by Mijak painters from Tresonče, led by Avram Zograf, the son of Dičo Zograf, the famous Mijak fresco painter.
