= Rista Ognjanović =

Macedonian intellectual

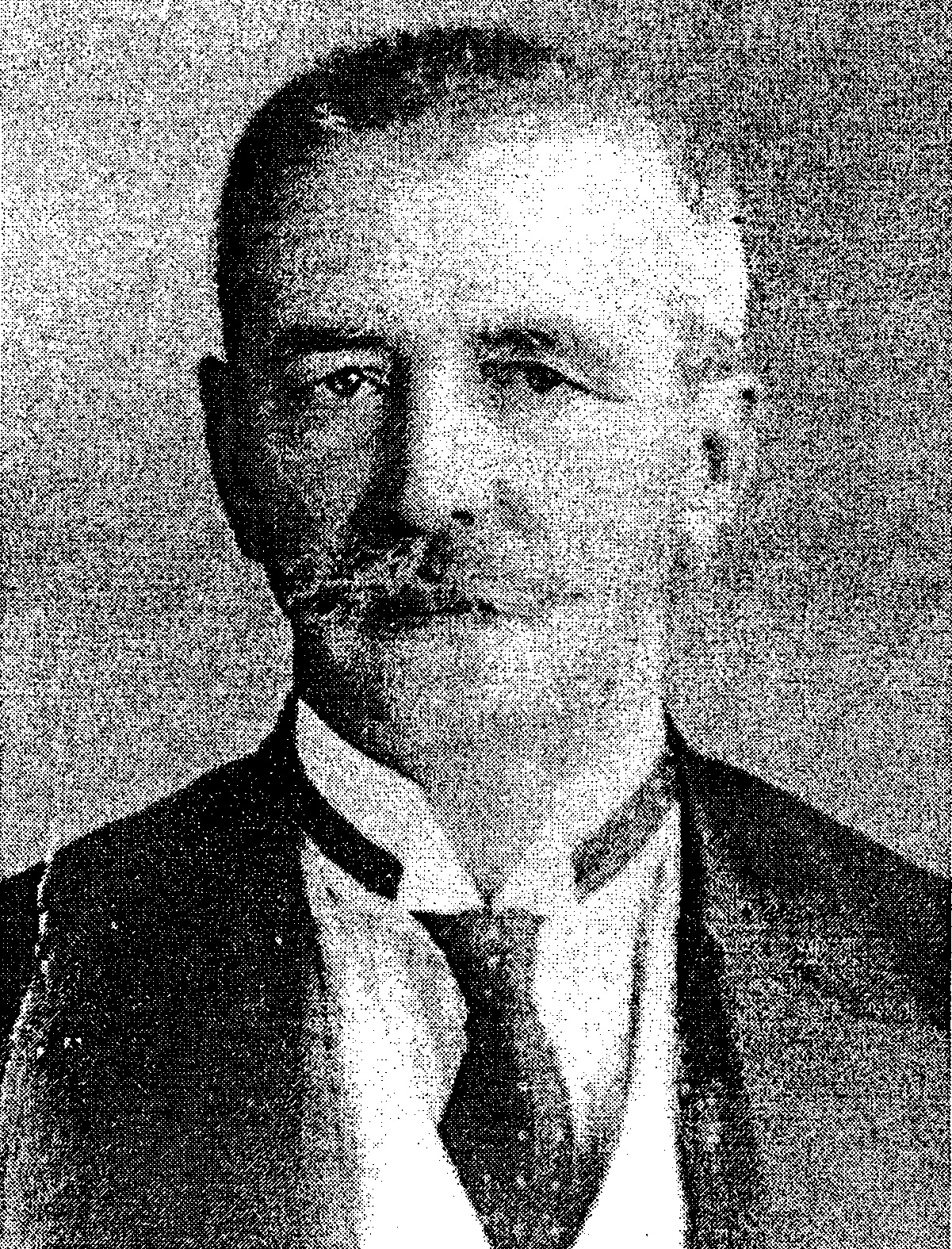
Risto Ognjanovikj-Lonoski

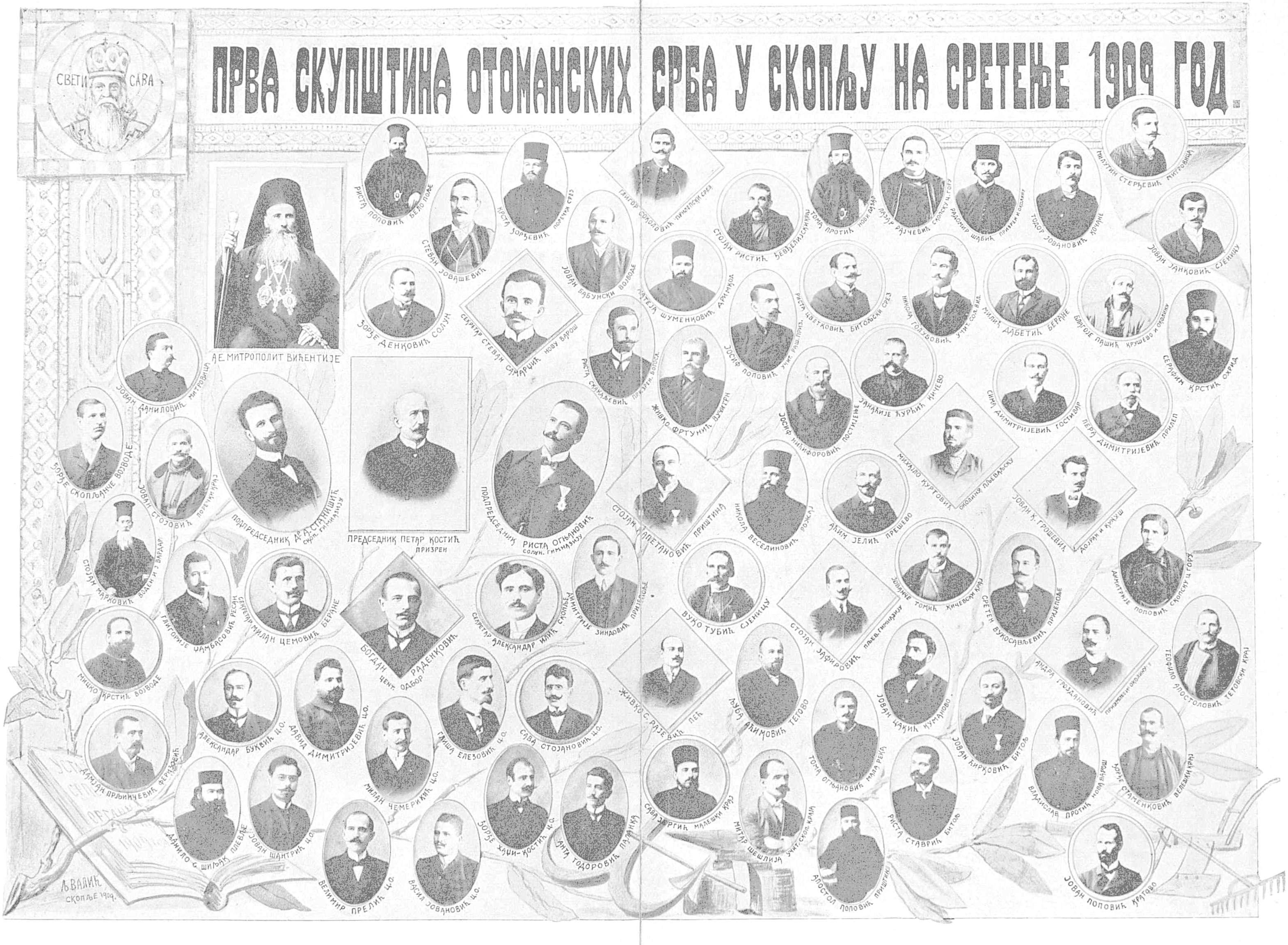
Poster with the delegates of the First Assembly of the Serbs in the Ottoman Empire (1909). Ognjanović, who was the vice president, is in the center right.

Rista Ognjanović (Serbian: Риста Огњановић) or Rista Ognjanovikj-Lonoski (Macedonian: Риста Огњановиќ-Лоноски; Bulgarian: Христо Огнянов; 1870–1941) was a Macedonian intellectual, Serbian and Yugoslav professor, and writer.

== Biography ==
He was born on March 1, 1870, in Galičnik, then in the Ottoman Empire. Ognjanović graduated from primary school in his hometown. Later he studied at the Bulgarian Men's High School of Thessaloniki from 1884 to 1887. In January 1887, a student riot broke out in the high school, as a result of which a group of students accepted the Serbian consul's offer to go and study for free at the expense of the "St. Sava" society in Belgrade.

Ognjanović graduated in 1890 from Belgrade University. He was close to Stojan Novaković and worked for the Serbian government in Ottoman Macedonia. On Novaković's recommendation, he studied at the Galatasaray Lyceum in Constantinople, French and Turkish as a private student from 1890 to 1892. Later, he left for Thessaloniki and from 1892 taught at the local Serbian primary school there. In the following year, 1893, Ognjanović was appointed as a French teacher at the Constantinople Serbian High School, where he worked until 1895. Later, he worked as an auditor of Serbian schools in the Kosovo vilayet. Then he made an unsuccessful attempt to open a Serbian school in Galičnik. In 1897, Ognjanović became a teacher at the Skopje Serbian High School. In 1900, he went on to specialize in Paris, where he studied French. From 1908 to 1910, he taught at the Thessaloniki Serbian High School. Later, Ognjanović was a deputy from Thessaloniki in the First Assembly of the Serbs in the Ottoman Empire. In 1911, he became the manager of the evening and holiday Serbian schools in Skopje. During the First World War, he was a teacher of Serbian students in France.

He died on April 6, 1941, in Skopje during a German bombardment of the city at the beginning of Operation Aufmarsch 25.

== Work ==
Ognjanović wrote in many Serbian magazines and newspapers in the field of pedagogy and psychology. He also collected folk songs from his native area. Ognjanović also translated books from French to Serbian. He is the author of the book "Galicnik from 1912 to 1922", published in Skopje in 1922. Among his other works includes an unpublished manuscript Stories and Life (Истории и живот) that illustrated violence committed in the Debar region.

In his book Galičnik and the Mijaks (Галичник и мијаците) written at the end of his life, but published for the first time in 2004 in Skopje, he details genealogies of families from this region and migration patterns, including new settlement of Albanians. He also wrote in detail about the Islamization of some Mijaks in that region, under pressure from the state, and the re-christening of some of them. He praises the local village leaders of Galičnik, Tresonče, Lazaropole, and Melničani for thwarting conversion to Islam in those villages, in particular crediting the Tomovci and Ažijevci households in this effort. Ognjanovikj-Lonoski also states in the book that Macedonians are clearly separate ethnicity neither Serbs nor Bulgarians.
