= Brsjaks =

Brsjaks (Macedonian: Брсјаци, romanized: Brsjaci) are an ethnographic group of Macedonians.

== Etymology ==
There are several theories as to the origin of the name "Brsjaci" (Macedonian: Брсјаци), according to the folk etymologies of the Mijaks recorded by Toma Smiljanić-Bradina the name comes from the Brsjak's great physical strength and endurance and propensity for violence and revolt with theories such as: "Brz i jak" (Брз и јак) meaning "fast and strong", and "Brziti" (Брзити) meaning "the fast ones" because of their supposed ability to run as fast as horses. Serbian writer Grigorije Božović also recorded similar findings which he ties to the Brsjaks ability to traverse mountains with ease and considers the name "Brsjak" (Брсјак) to be synonymous with "Highlander".

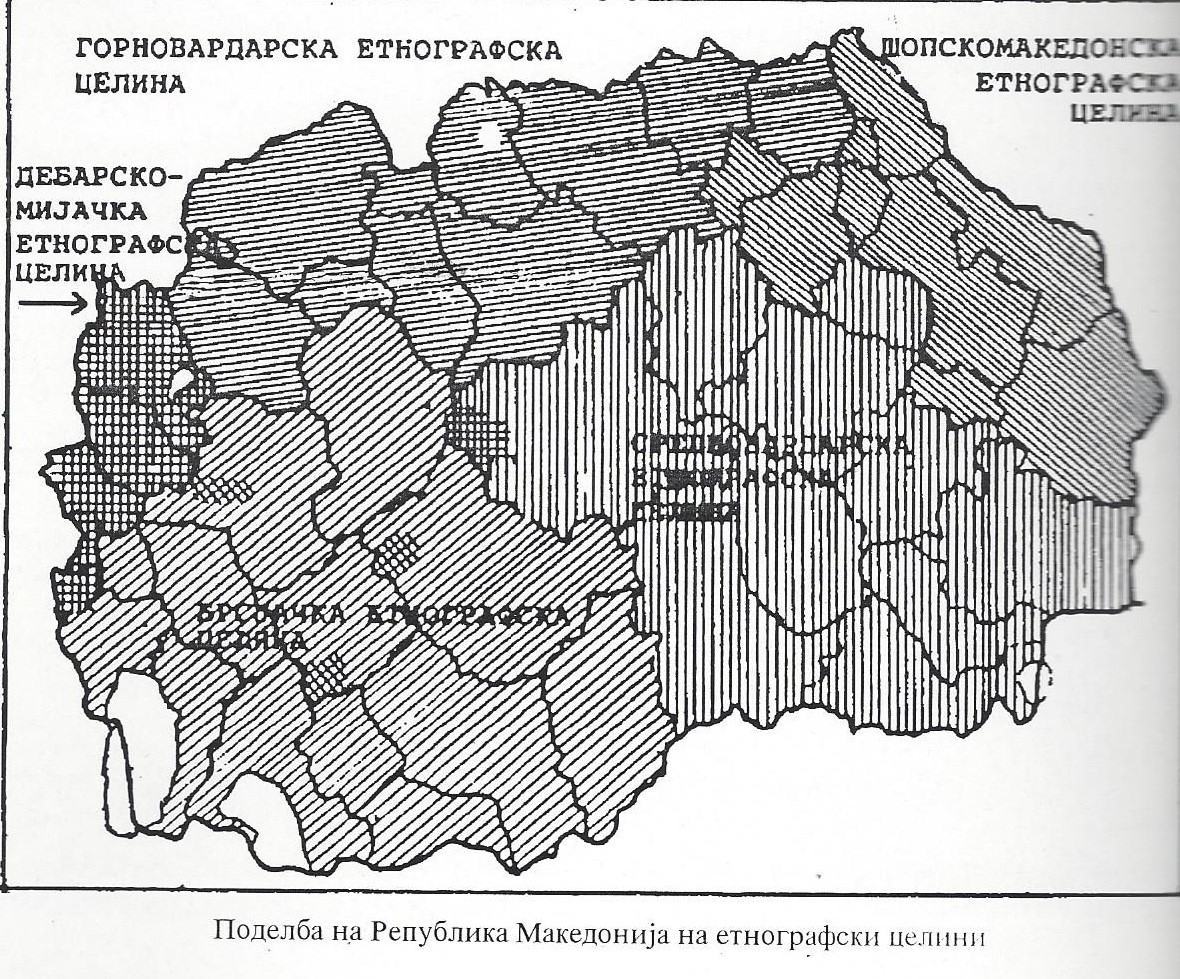
Ethnographic region in North Macedonia, the South-Western region is known as Brsjačija (Macedonian: Брсјачија)

The Mijaks in that name usually see the quality of the Brsjaks, who are hot-tempered and quickly ready for a quarrel and fight... However, it seems that the name comes because of their quality to walk quickly in the mountains or simply as mountaineers. Accordingly, their name would mean highlanders, mountaineer, forest people, mountain people...

According to Toma Smiljanić-Bradina the Brsjaks are named after the food that they gave their livestock which is called "Brst" (Брст).

== Distribution ==
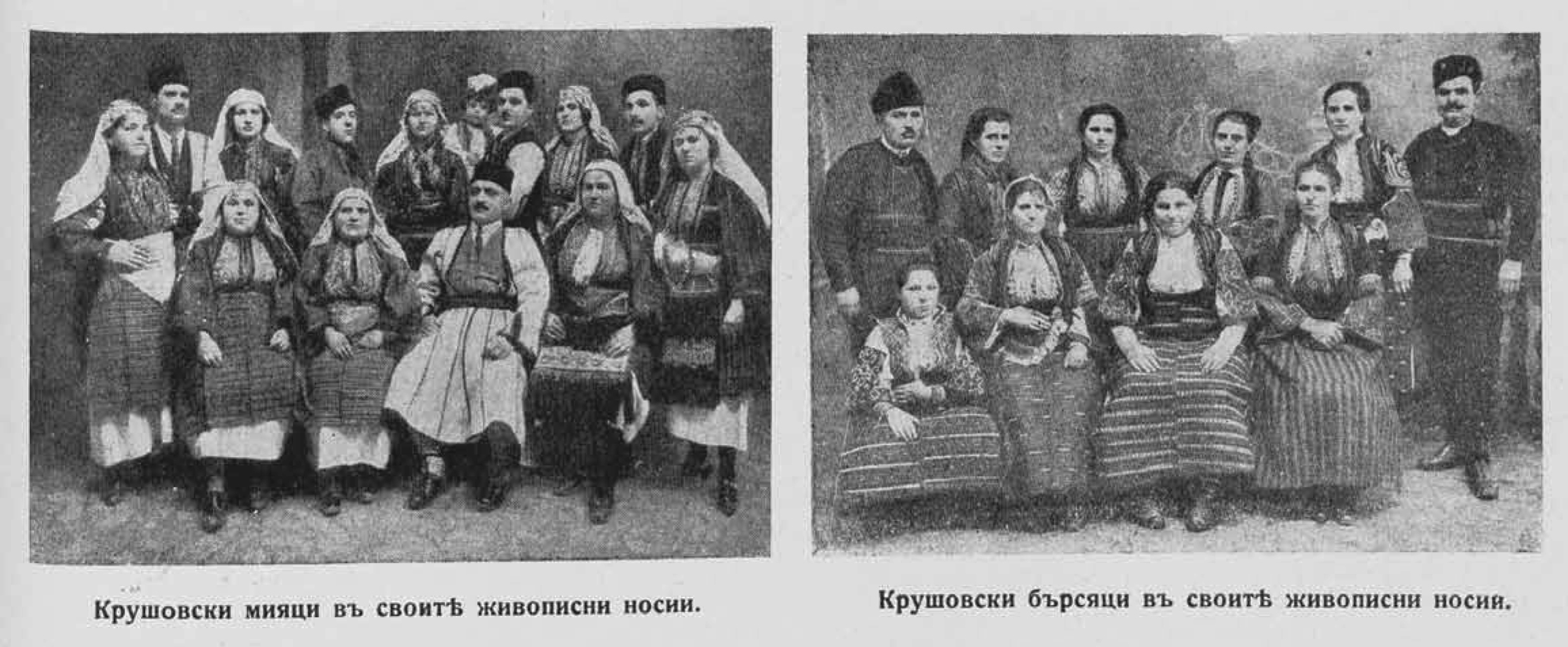
The Brsjak community of Krushevo

The Brsjaks mostly inhabit areas in the central and western part of Macedonia with the Vardar River forming the eastern boundary, bordering the Mijaks to the west with the Bistra as a boundary, and to the south to Prespa and Pelagonija, the Brsjak identity is best preserved in the Azot Region due to settlements of a rival tribe the Mijaks.
