= Isaija Mažovski =

Mijak painter

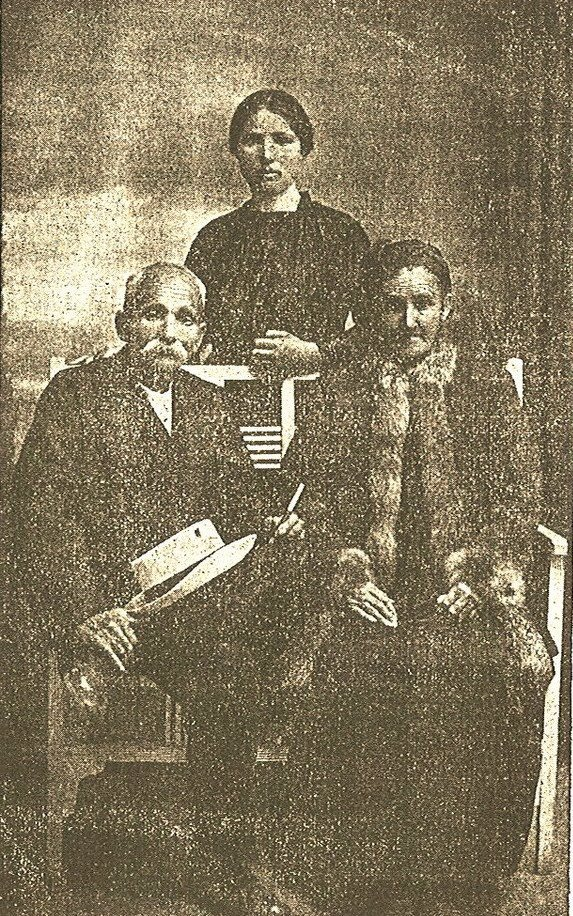
Mažovski with his family

Isaija Radev Mažovski (Macedonian: Исаија Радев Мажовски, Bulgarian: Исая Радев Мажовски; 1852–1926) was a Mijak painter and activist. Mažovski sought political solutions in the liberation of Ottoman Macedonia. A Slavophile, he travelled to Russia to establish contacts with prominent individuals there including the Russian tsar, hoping to gain support for Macedonian liberation.

Mažovski also advocated the idea of a joint Macedonian-Albanian effort against the Ottomans; he was a leader of the Macedonian-Albanian Revolutionary League. He had been imprisoned alongside Albanians in his life and knew the Albanian language. He wrote on the topic of Albanians and Macedonians achieving autonomy.

Mažovski was born on 9 March 1852 in Lazaropole, where he completed church school. As a painter, he was educated by fellow Mijak Dičo Zograf. Mažovski emigrated finally to Bulgaria in 1899 where he settled in Pleven. Mažovski was married there earlier to his wife Dunava, with whom they had three sons and a daughter. He died in Ugarchin in 1926.

== Memoirs ==
In 1922, he authored Memoirs (Вѫзпоминания), which expressed his personal ideology and desires for Macedonia, as well as recollections of everyday village life in his native Lazaropole and the Mijak region as a whole. Mažovski claimed in the book that "the Old Slavic Macedonian nation came to Macedonia 2,500 years" prior and that Philip II of Macedon and Alexander the Great were "pure Slavs". In a request to the Russian Emperor Nicholas II from 1885, he wrote that the Macedonian Slavic-Bulgarians were resettled from Russia to Macedonia 2,600 years ago. He also recalls in an instance in Russia in 1897 when asked about his nation, he responded that "we are an Old Slavic nation, migrating from 'Great Mother Russia' much earlier than the Bulgarians and the Serbs, though our language is closer to the Bulgarian one" and that "we are followers of the Holy Bulgarian Exarchate." Blaže Koneski noted by what names Mažovski called the Macedonian Slavs. Regularly he used for them the designations "Macedonians" or "Old Macedonian Slavic people", but also often wrote about the "Macedonian Slavic-Bulgarians". However, this name meant something different to him than just the name "Bulgarians". "Slavic-Bulgarian" for Mažovski was synonymous with "Macedonian", while only "Bulgarian" was a designation for the Bulgarian people in then Bulgaria. Similar parahistorical plots connecting the Slavs and Paleo-Balkan peoples were characteristic for the 19th century in Ottoman Bulgaria and later in Ottoman Macedonia.

He also writes of encounters with Albanian tribal leaders in Debar who told him they were preparing to declare Albanian independence.

== See also ==
- Spiridon Gabrovski
- Georgi Pulevski
- Ivan Gologanov
- Antiquization
- Autochthonous theory about the origin of the Bulgarians
