= Parteniy Zografski =

Bulgarian bishop (died 1876)

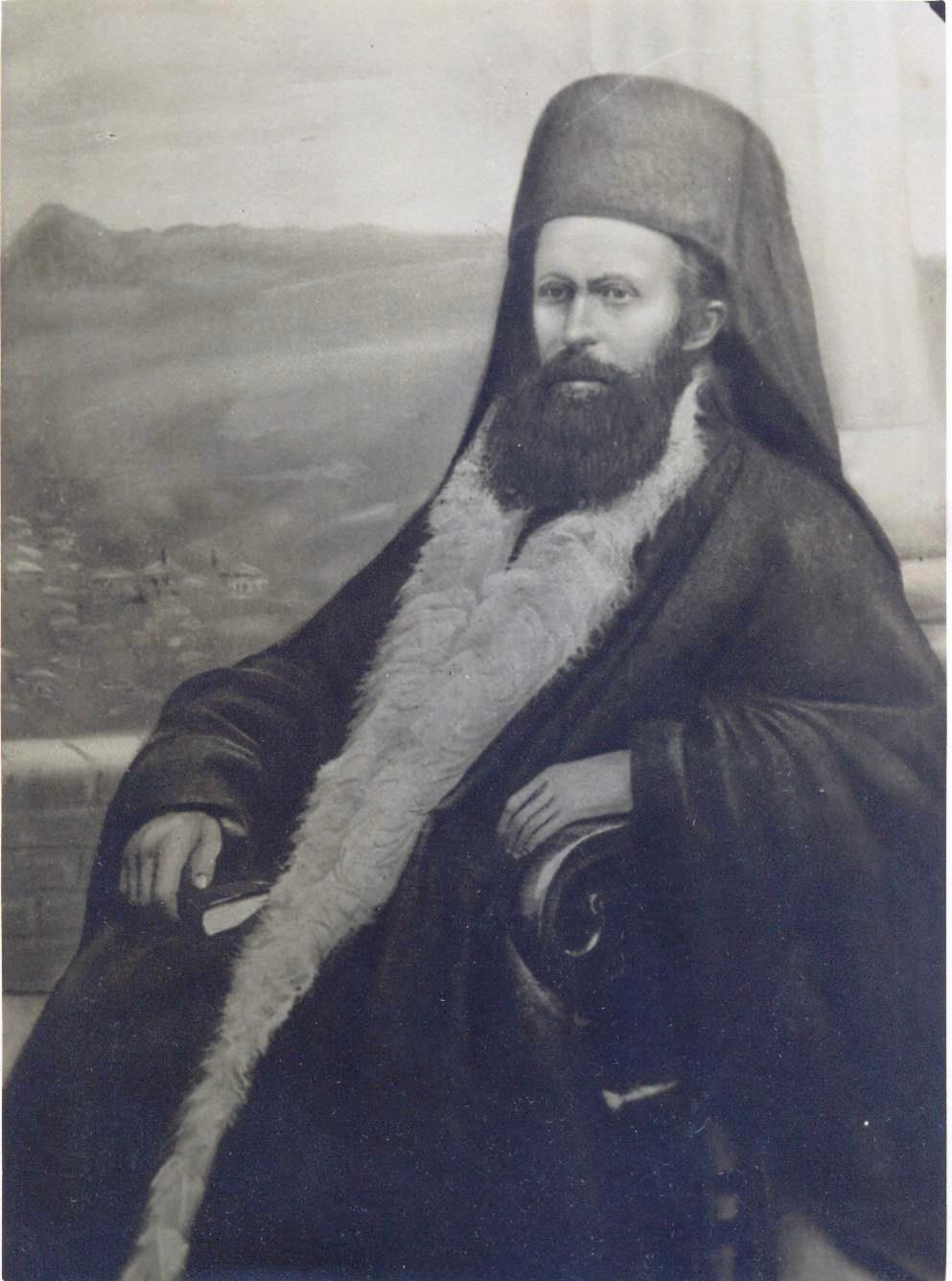
Parteniy Zografski as Metropolitan of Nishava (Bulgarian Exarchate).

Essay about the Bulgarian language, published by Zografski in Balgarski knizhitsi (Bulgarian Booklets) magazine in 1858.

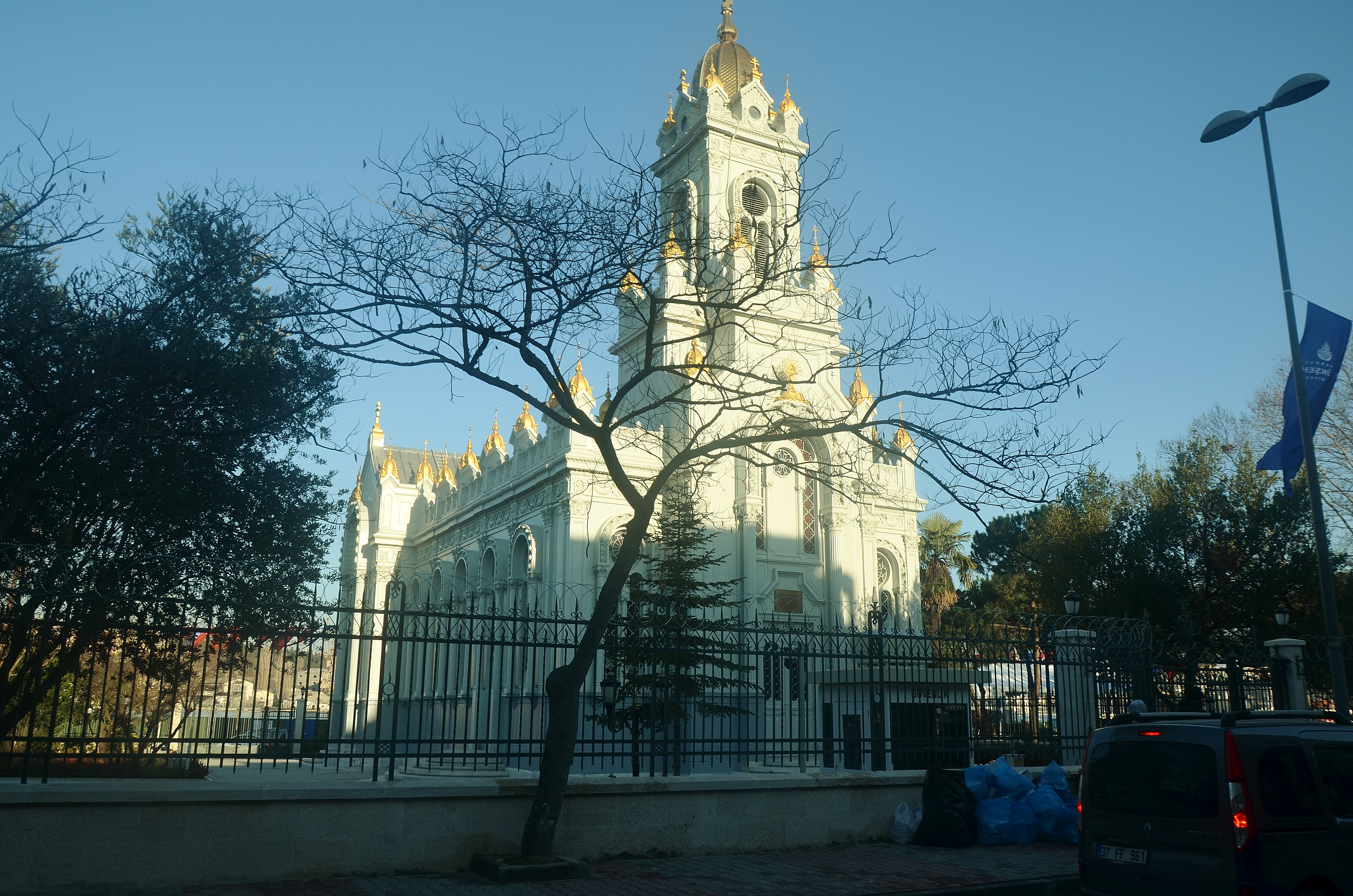
The Bulgarian church in Istanbul where Parteny Zografski is buried.

Parteniy Zografski (Bulgarian: Партений Зографски; Macedonian: Партенија Зографски, romanized: Partenija Zografski; born Pavel Hadzhivasilkov Trizlovski; died 7 February 1876) or Parteniy Nishavski (Bulgarian: Партений Нишавски) was a 19th-century Bulgarian cleric, educator and writer from Galičnik in Ottoman Macedonia, and one of the early figures of the Bulgarian National Revival. In his works he referred to his language as Bulgarian and had a Bulgarian consciousness, though besides contributing to the development of the Bulgarian language, in North Macedonia he is also thought to have contributed to the distinguishment of present-day Macedonian.

== Life ==
Zografski was born as Pavel Hadzhivasilkov Trizlovski (Павел Хадживасилков Тризловски) in Galičnik, Ottoman Empire (present-day North Macedonia), into the family of a rich pastoralist. The exact year of his birth is disputed. His biographers have given the dates 1818 and 1820, while a metropolitan of Veles suggested that he was born in 1819. Zografski started his education in the Saint Jovan Bigorski Monastery near his native village, then he moved to Ohrid in 1836, where he was taught by Dimitar Miladinov. He also studied in Prizren, the Greek schools in Thessaloniki, Istanbul and a seminary (supported by Archimandrite Anatoly Zografski) in Athens.

In 1837, together with his brothers and father, he traveled to Jerusalem, becoming a hajji. Zografski became a monk at the Zograf Monastery on Mount Athos, where he acquired his clerical name Parteniy (Parthenius). Through Archimandrite Anatoly, he contacted Vasil Aprilov and continued his studies at the Theological Seminary of Odessa, Russian Empire, and briefly resided in the Căpriana monastery in Moldavia. Per Blaže Koneski, he developed a pro-Bulgarian tone under the influence of Aprilov. He was also sent to complete his education in Kiev. Zografski graduated from the Kiev seminary in 1846 and from the Moscow seminary in 1850. He stayed in Paris for several months, studying French. He was patronized by the Russian diplomacy and served as a preacher and confessor in a Russian church there. With the permission of the Russian ambassador Aleksey Lobanov-Rostovsky, he went to the Zograf Monastery. On 23 November 1851, he established a theological school there, which the Greek spiritual authorities closed in the following year. He also served as a spiritual advisor at the imperial court in St. Petersburg. In 1852, a small group of Bulgarian students established a Bulgarian cultural society named Balgarska matitsa (Bulgarian Motherland) in St. Petersburg and he was among those who joined the group. From 1852 to 1855, he taught Church Slavonic at the Halki seminary. He was forced to leave the school because of the Crimean War (1853–1856) and the authorities' suspicion that he was teaching Russian. Due to his strong ties with the Russian embassy, he went to Mount Athos and returned to Istanbul only after the end of the war. Until 1858, he was the director of the Bulgarian school in Istanbul, where he organized teaching based on modern principles. At the same time, he served in the Bulgarian St. Stephen Church and the Russian church.

Zografski developed an active literary activity. He collaborated with the magazine Bulgarian Writers as well as the first Bulgarian newspapers – Tsarigradski Vestnik, Savetnik, Macedonia and others. In 1857, he published A Brief Sacred History of the Old and New Testament Church, Elementary Education for Children in 1858, and in 1859 he published A Brief Slavonic Grammar. He translated the "Life of Clement of Ohrid", written by Theophylact of Ohrid, from Greek into the Macedonian vernacular, but strongly influenced by the east Bulgarian dialect and the Church Slavonic language. It was the first Slavic translation of the work. Zografski also collected folk songs.

He spent the end of 1859 in Sofia where he ordained dozens of Bulgarian priests. On 29 October 1859, at the request of the Municipality of Kukush (Kilkis), the Patriarchate appointed Zografski as Metropolitan of Dojran in order to counter the rise of the Eastern Catholic Macedonian Apostolic Vicariate of the Bulgarians. Zografski co-operated with the locals to establish Bulgarian schools and increase the use of Church Slavonic in liturgy. In 1861, the Greek Orthodox Church Metropolitan of Thessaloniki and a clerical court prosecuted him, but he was acquitted in 1863. In 1867, he was appointed Metropolitan of Nishava in Pirot. In this position, he supported the Bulgarian education in these regions and countered the Serbian influence. According to Bulgarian academic Simeon Radev, Zografski hated the Greeks and this hatred became even more intense after the death of the Miladinov brothers. In Dojran, he was accused of burning Greek liturgical books. After the establishment of the Bulgarian Exarchate in 1870, he joined it. Thus, the Ecumenical Patriarchate of Constantinople excommunicated him in November 1870 and confirmed the deposition on 16 September 1872. He remained as the Bulgarian Metropolitan of Pirot until 15 October 1874, when he resigned, citing poor health due to the climate. Zografski died in Istanbul on 7 February 1876 and was buried in the courtyard of the Bulgarian St. Stephen Church.

=== Linguistic views ===
Page from "Elementary Education for Children", published in 1858 in Constantinople. The top section reads: "The Bulgarian alphabet for those Bulgarians, who know how to read in Greek and want to learn in Bulgarian"

Per Zografski, the Bulgarian language was divided into two major dialects, Upper Bulgarian and Lower Bulgarian; the former was spoken in Bulgaria (i.e. modern North Bulgaria), in Thrace, and in some parts of Macedonia, while the latter in most of Macedonia. In 1857, he espoused this linguistic view in an article published in Tsarigradski vestnik and called "The following article is very important and we encourage readers to read it carefully":

"Our language, like any other, has many local dialects, almost every diocese (district) has its own dialects, but such differences in language are an unremarkable difference, they cannot be called dialects properly. To our knowledge, our language is divided into two main dialects, Upper-Bulgarian and Lower-Bulgarian, the first is spoken in Bulgaria, in Thrace and some parts of Macedonia, and the other in Macedonia in general, or Old Bulgaria, and these two have their sub-dialects."

In the next year, Zografski argued that the Macedonian dialect should represent the basis for the common modern "Macedono-Bulgarian" literary standard called simply "Bulgarian" in another article published in Balgarski knizhitsi called "Thoughts about the Bulgarian language":

Our language, as it is well known, is divided into two main dialects, of which one is spoken in Bulgaria and Thrace, and the other one in Macedonia... To promote to the world the Macedonian dialect with all its general and local idioms, as much as we can, we intend to create a Grammar for it, in parallel with the other one... The first and biggest difference between the two dialects is, in our opinion, is the difference in pronunciation or the stress. The Macedonian dialect usually prefers to place the stress in the beginning of the words, and the other one in the end, so in the first dialect you can’t find a word with a stress on the last syllable, while in the latter in most cases the stress is on the last syllable. Here Macedonian dialect is approaching the Serbian dialect...Not only should not and cannot the Macedonian dialect be excluded from the common standard language, it would also have been better if it was accepted as its main basis; the reason being that it is more melodious, more fluent and better structured, and in many ways fuller and richer.

He regarded his vernacular as a version of the Bulgarian language and called the Macedonian dialects "Lower Bulgarian", while designating the region of Macedonia as "Old Bulgaria". However, his textbooks provoked criticism in the Bulgarian press, where his language was described as a mixture of Bulgarian and Serbian and his efforts were denounced as separatist. Per Victor Friedman, the appearance of these textbooks, and the reactions they generated, reflected the development of some form of Macedonian consciousness. In 1870 Marin Drinov, who played a decisive role in the standardization of the Bulgarian language, rejected the proposal of Parteniy Zografski and Kuzman Shapkarev for a mixed eastern and western Bulgarian/Macedonian foundation of the standard Bulgarian language, stating in his article in the newspaper Makedoniya: "Such an artificial assembly of written language is something impossible, unattainable and never heard of." The fundamental issue then was in which part of the Bulgarian lands the Bulgarian tongue was preserved in a most true manner and every dialectal community insisted on that. In fact, Bulgarian was standardized later on the basis of the Central Balkan dialect, because of the belief then that in the Tarnovo region, around the last medieval capital of Bulgaria, the language was preserved in its purest form.

=== Legacy ===
In the year that Zografski died, Drinov visited his birthplace and studied the local Galičnik dialect, which he regarded as part of the Bulgarian diasystem, publishing afterwards the folk songs collected there. The division of the dialects of the Eastern South Slavic into western and eastern subgroups made by Zografski has continued to be relevant, while the so-called yat border is the most important dividing isogloss there. It divides also the region of Macedonia running along the Velingrad–Petrich–Thessaloniki line.

Since the times of Socialist Federal Republic of Yugoslavia, historians in present-day North Macedonia have insisted Zografski's literary works published in western Macedonian vernacular make him a leading representative of the "Macedonian National Rebirth". He is interpreted by them and literary scholars there as a supporter of an idea for a two-way Bulgaro-Macedonian compromise, not unlike the one achieved by Serbs and Croats with the 1850 Vienna Literary Agreement. Another interpretation of theirs is that he made the first scientific attempt to distinguish the Macedonian language. Zografski is honored in Bulgaria and North Macedonia.
