= Melnica =

Melnica, which translates as Mill from Serbo-Croatian, may refer to:

- Melnica, Istria County, Croatia
- Melnica, Čaška, North Macedonia
- Melnica, Prilep, North Macedonia
- Melnica (Petrovac), Serbia
