= Sirma Voyvoda =

Bulgarian hajduk

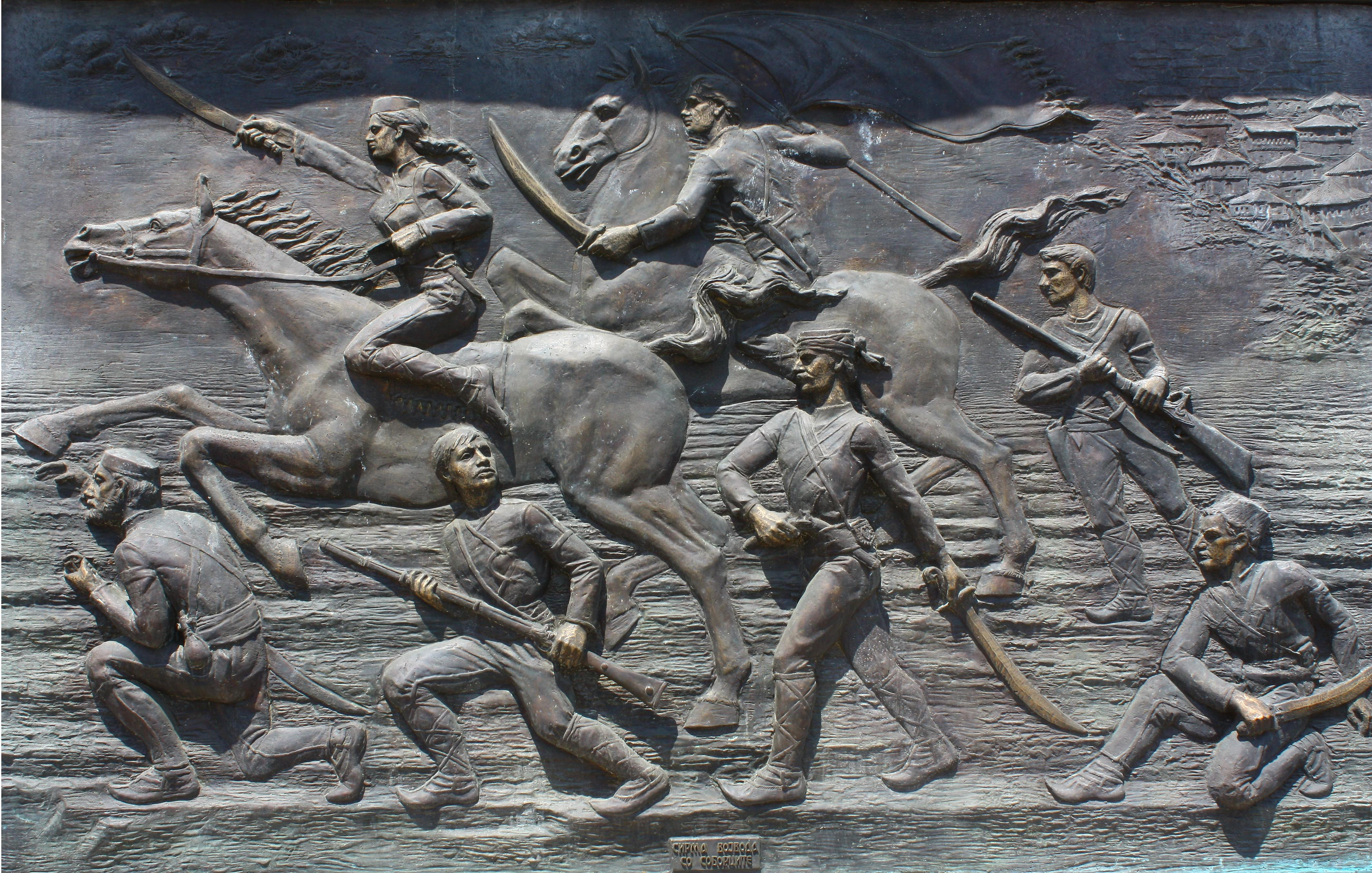
Plaque of Sirma Voyvoda and her troops in Skopje, North Macedonia

Sirma Voyvoda (1776–1864) was a Bulgarian haidutka (female irregular fighter). Disguised as a man, she participated in the guerilla movement in Ottoman Vardar Macedonia between 1791 and 1813. In 1856/1857, as an 80-year-old woman, the Bulgarian educator Dimitar Miladinov met her in Prilep. In their collection Bulgarian Folk Songs the Miladinov brothers recorded a song about Sirma Voyvoda. Per the note that Dimitar Miladinov left under this song No. 212, which refers to Sirma Vojvoda, she married a Bulgarian Mijak from Krushevo. She was killed by Turks in 1864. Sirma Voyvoda is recognized as a patriotic heroine also in what is today North Macedonia.
