= Josif Mihailović Jurukovski =

Serbian politician and intellectual

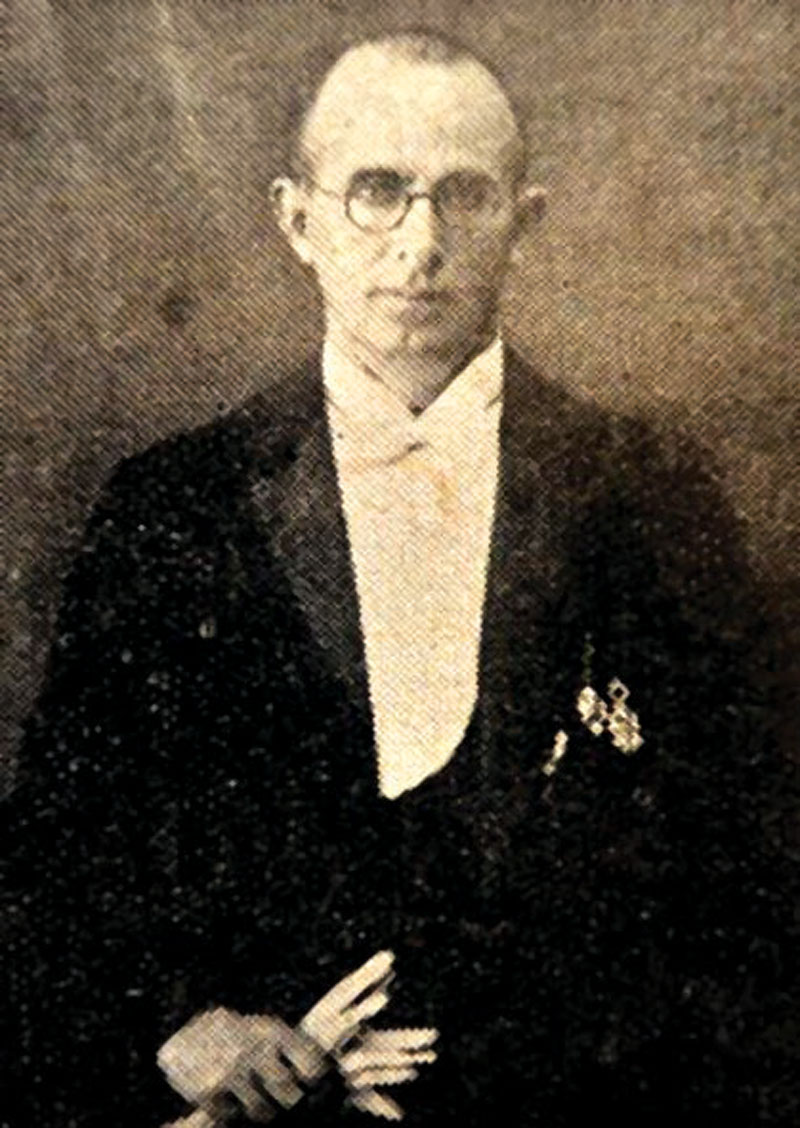

Josif Mihailović (Macedonian: Јосиф Михаиловиќ, Serbian Cyrillic: Јосиф Михаиловић) (1887 in Tresonče, Ottoman Empire – 11 March 1941 in Skopje, Kingdom of Yugoslavia) was a Serbian politician and intellectual of Mijak descent, mayor of Skopje between 1929 and 1931, and was responsible for its transformation from an oriental Ottoman into a modern European city.

== Life ==
Mihailović was born in the village of Tresonče, close to Mavrovo, in 1887. A number of important Mijaks came from this village. His father Mihailo was a builder who spent his life renovating churches in Macedonia and in Kosovo. His mother’s family came from the neighboring Lazaropole.

Mihailović received his primary and secondary education in Serbian schools in Skopje and Thessalonica. He enrolled in the Architectural Department of the Technical Faculty in Belgrade, from where he graduated in 1910 as one of the best students of that generation. Mihailović proceeded to post-graduate studies in Italy.

He returned to Serbia in 1912 to take part in the First Balkans War joining the Serbian Chetnik guerrilla unit of vojvoda Doksim and took part in the Kumanovo Battle where he was wounded in the head. In 1914, he was appointed to the Engineering Command of the General staff of the Serbian army. He stayed in military service until 1916 and the retreat of the Serbian army to Corfu. He was then sent to the United States to gather financial help and volunteers for the Salonika front.

After the war, he first graduated for a civil servant at the Dubique University, Iowa, US. He then went to the Sorbonne for specialization and also to London where he studied at the High School for Town Organization. This is where he obtained his PhD in 1920.

Back in Belgrade, he was one of the founders of Feniks construction company. As one of the best-educated Serbs from Macedonia, Mihailović was appointed to be the mayor of Skopje. He performed this function on two occasions: from 1929 to 1936 and from 1939 to his death in 1941.

During his two terms he worked hard to transform Skopje into a modern city. Most of the monumental buildings and other much needed infrastructural and educational objects were built on Mihailović’s insistence. In his two terms, Skopje was given a detailed urban plan, an extensive water supply system, Matka dam, new railway station, the famous Officers Club on the banks of Vardar, town park, several suburbs based on the principles of “garden cities” and a zoo.

In 1936, he married Vukosava (née Smiljanić) with whom she had two daughters, Mirjana (1938-2007) and Svetlana (1941-1945).

Despite numerous political changes since his death in 1941, Skopje still has a street named after him.
