= Reka dialect =

Dialect of Macedonian

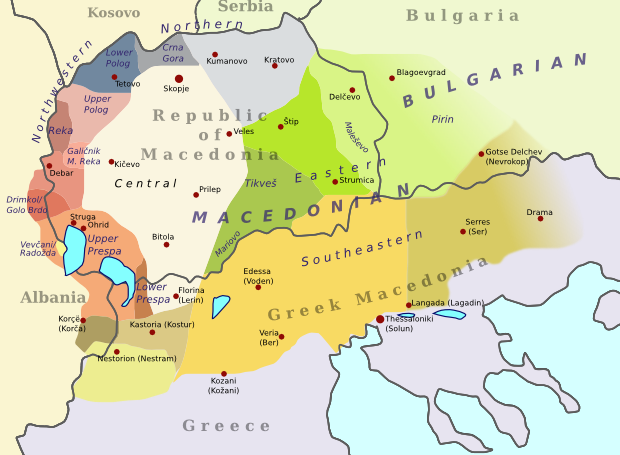
The Reka dialect (brown) on the map of Macedonian dialects.

The Reka dialect (Macedonian: Рекански дијалект, Rekanski dijalekt) is a member of the west and north-west subgroup of the western group of dialects of Macedonian. The dialect is mainly spoken on the territory of the region Reka in the north-western part of North Macedonia. The Reka dialect is very close with the Galičnik and the Debar dialects. This dialect contains a lot of archaic words.

== Phonological characteristics ==
- High frequency of the consonant f (ф)
- Low frequency of the consonant dž (џ), replaced with ž (ж) or žd (жд)
- Use of o instead of a

== Morphological characteristics ==
- The end of the verbs from the a group are frequently pronounced as verbs from the e group (играат > играет)
- Use of the three articles
- Use of the suffix -т for the third person singular
- Use of the preposition во/в
