= Georgi Pulevski =

Mijak writer and revolutionary (1817–1893)

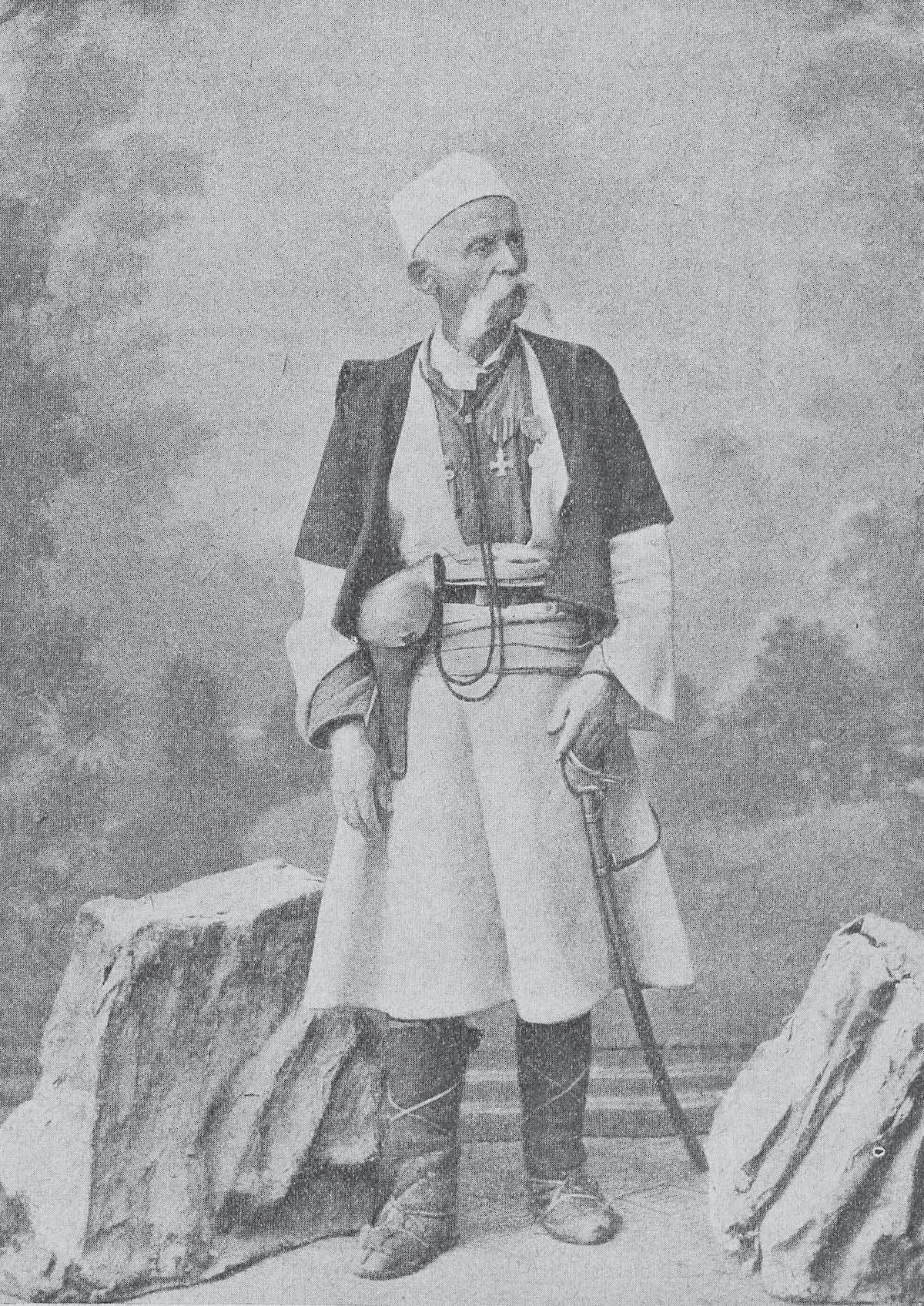
- Born: 1817; Galiçnik, Ottoman Empire (present-day Galičnik, North Macedonia)
- Died: 13 February 1893 (aged 75–76); Sofia, Principality of Bulgaria
- Occupations: Writer and revolutionary

Georgi Pulevski, sometimes also Gjorgji, Gjorgjija Pulevski or Đorđe Puljevski (Macedonian: Ѓорѓи Пулевски or Ѓорѓија Пулевски, Bulgarian: Георги Пулевски, Serbian: Ђорђе Пуљевски; 1817 – 13 February 1893), was a Mijak revolutionary, self-styled lexicographer, self-taught grammarian, historian, textbook writer, ethnographer and poet.

Pulevski was born in Galičnik, he trained as a stonemason and later became a self-taught writer. He is known as one of the first authors to express the idea of a distinct Macedonian nation and Macedonian language.

== Life ==
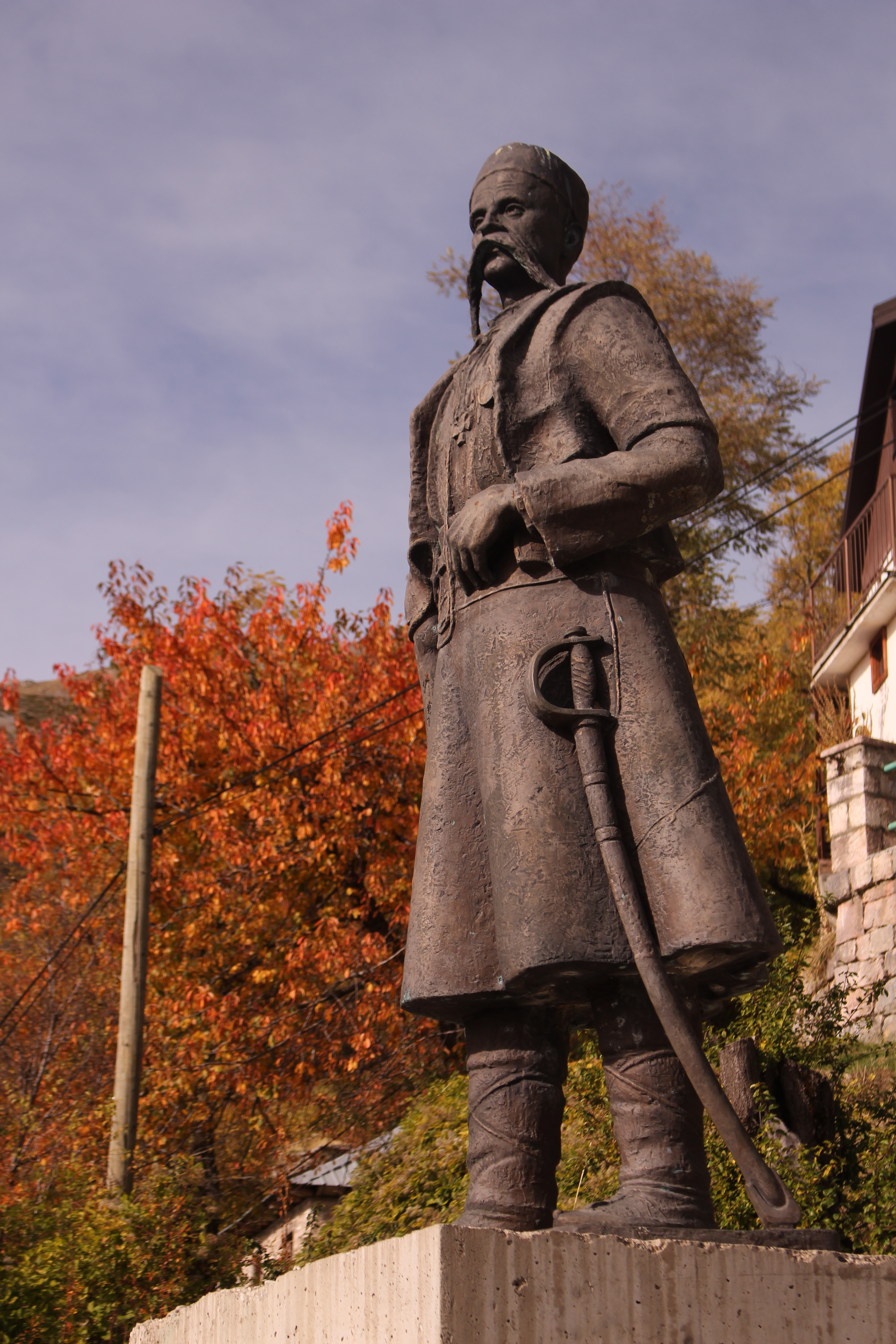
Statue of Pulevski in his native village of Galičnik.

Pulevski was born in the village of Galičnik in the Mijak tribal region in 1817. As a seven-year-old, he went to Danubian Principalities with his father as a migrant worker (pečalbar). He was trained as a stonemason. Pulevski did not have a formal education. According to popular legends, Pulevski was engaged as a hajduk in the area of Golo Brdo.

At the age of 45, Pulevski fought as a member of the First Bulgarian Legion in 1862 against the Ottoman siege at Belgrade. He also participated in the Serbian–Ottoman War in 1876, and then in the Russo-Turkish War of 1877–78 as part of the Bulgarian Volunteer Corps, which led to the Liberation of Bulgaria; during the latter, he was a voivode of a unit of Bulgarian volunteers, taking part in the Battle of Shipka Pass. He also participated as a volunteer in the Kresna-Razlog Uprising (1878–79), also referred to as Macedonian uprising by the insurgents. Pulevski was awarded the Order of St. George for his bravery during the Russo-Turkish War. By decree of Prince Alexander I of Bulgaria at the end of 1879, he was granted financial assistance from the state budget for the development of his literary activity.

In an application for a veteran pension to the Bulgarian Parliament in 1882, he expressed his regret about the failure of the unification of Ottoman Macedonia with Bulgaria. In 1883, aged 66, Pulevski received a government pension in recognition of his service as a Bulgarian volunteer. Pulevski settled in the village of Progorelec, near Lom, Bulgaria, where he received gratuitously agricultural land from the state. Later he moved to Kyustendil. In 1888 in Sofia he founded the Slavo-Macedonian Literary Society, which aimed at promoting the Macedonian language and literature, but it was dispersed by the authorities and some of its members were imprisoned. Pulevski died in Sofia on 13 February 1893.

== Works ==
A Dictionary of Three languages (1875)

Pulevski authored Dictionary of Four Languages in 1873, where he identified the vernacular Slavic language of Macedonia as "Serbo-Albanian". In 1875, Pulevski published Dictionary of Three Languages (Rečnik od tri jezika, Речник од три језика) in Belgrade, which probably contained the first use of the term "Slavic Macedonian" or "Slav Macedonian" for the vernacular of the Macedonian Slavs. It was a trilingual conversational manual composed in "question-and-answer" style in three parallel columns, in Macedonian, Albanian and Turkish, all three written in Cyrillic. The basis of his language was his native Galičnik dialect but with certain and unsystematic concessions to the central Macedonian dialects. It was an attempt to use a supra-dialectal language. Pulevski stated that the Macedonians were a separate nation and advocated for the Macedonian language. It was the first work that publicly claimed Macedonian to be a separate language. However, there is no exclusive connection of nation, language, territory and statehood in the work, which is different from the ideas in the later work On Macedonian Matters by Krste Misirkov. Pulevski incorporated Kuzman Shapkarev's 1868 primer Elementary Knowledge for Little Children into the work. He acknowledged Macedonia as a multilingual and multiethnic region. The adjective "Macedonian" was not reserved exclusively for the Slavic inhabitants of Macedonia. Per linguist Victor Friedman, Pulevski tried to articulate both the sense of a Macedonian ethnic nationality and the sense of a Macedonian civic national identity.

What do we call a nation? – People who are of the same origin and who speak the same words and who live and make friends of each other, who have the same customs and songs and entertainment are what we call a nation, and the place where that people lives is called the people's country. Thus the Macedonians also are a nation and the place which is theirs is called Macedonia.

His next published works were a revolutionary poem, Samovila Makedonska (Macedonian Fairy), published in 1878, and a Macedonian Song Book in two volumes, published in 1879, which contained both folk songs collected by Pulevski and some original poems by himself. The former was re-published by Shapkarev in 1882 in the journal Maritsa.

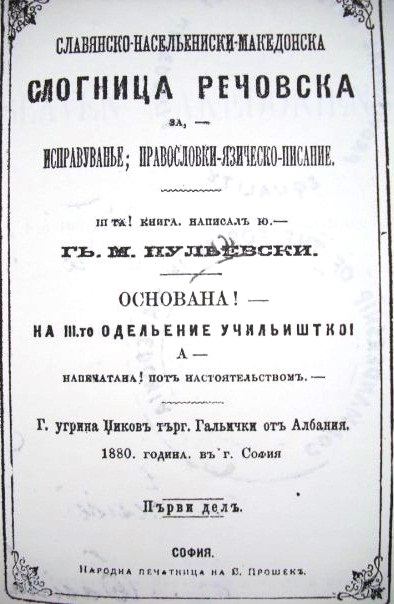
Grammar of the language of the Slavic Macedonian population (1880)

In 1880, Pulevski published Slavjano-naseljenski makedonska slognica rečovska (Grammar of the language of the Slavic Macedonian population), a work that is known as the first attempt at a grammar of Macedonian. All records of this book were lost during the first half of 20th century and only discovered again in 1953 in Ohrid on the initiative of Blaže Koneski. Since Pulevski was not adequately educated for the task, his grammar remains only an expression of the striving for a Macedonian literary language. Also, it has been characterized as seminal in its signaling of ethnic and linguistic consciousness but not sufficiently elaborated to serve as a codification. In Bulgarian sources his so-called last grammar work is mentioned Jazitshnica, soderzsayushtaja starobolgarski ezik, uredena em izpravlena da se uchat bolgarski i makedonski sinove i kerki; (Grammar, containing Old Bulgarian language, arranged and corrected to be taught to Bulgarian and Macedonian sons and daughters), in which he considered the Macedonian dialects to be old Bulgarian and the differences between the two purely geographical. However, the details around it are unclear as to where it is kept or when it is dated.

Slavic Macedonian General History (1893)

By 1893, Pulevski had largely completed Slavjanomakedonska opšta istorija (Slavic Macedonian General History), a large manuscript with around 1000 pages. He stated that he wrote the manuscript "in the Slavic-Macedonian dialect (narečenije) so that it could be understood by all the Slavs of the peninsula." He identified the Ottoman Macedonia from which he originated with ancient Macedonia and considered the Macedonian Slavs to be ancient inhabitants of the Balkan peninsula. Per historian Biljana Ristovska-Josifovska, Pulevski was entirely consistent with his time's specifics of determining national distinctiveness, emphasizing Slavophilism, with resorting to ancient history as symbols. The idea of direct descendance from ancient Macedonians represented a demonstration of resistance and specific expression of national identity by stressing the glory of ancient Macedonia. Also, much space was reserved for the Nemanjids, as well as Saint Sava, who was described as holy, although by his own words his information was limited to the reproduction of older chroniclers and Serbian historians. For Pulevski, the Serbian tsars, like the Bulgarian tsars, were foreigners, described as ruling over "Macedonian regions." He was narrating the Slavic peoples' medieval history under titles regarding the history of Bulgaria, Wallachia, and Serbia, but he was stressing his own conclusions concerning ethnicity. According to Ristovska-Josifovska, he had a clear conception of how Macedonians differed from other Slavs. The work was firmly and directly influenced by Mauro Orbini's work, where the pan-Slavic idea and the autochthonism of the Slavs in the Balkans and beyond are asserted. Pulevski also wrote about the places where the Mijaks were concentrated, their migrations and the Mijak region.

== Ancestry, identification and legacy ==
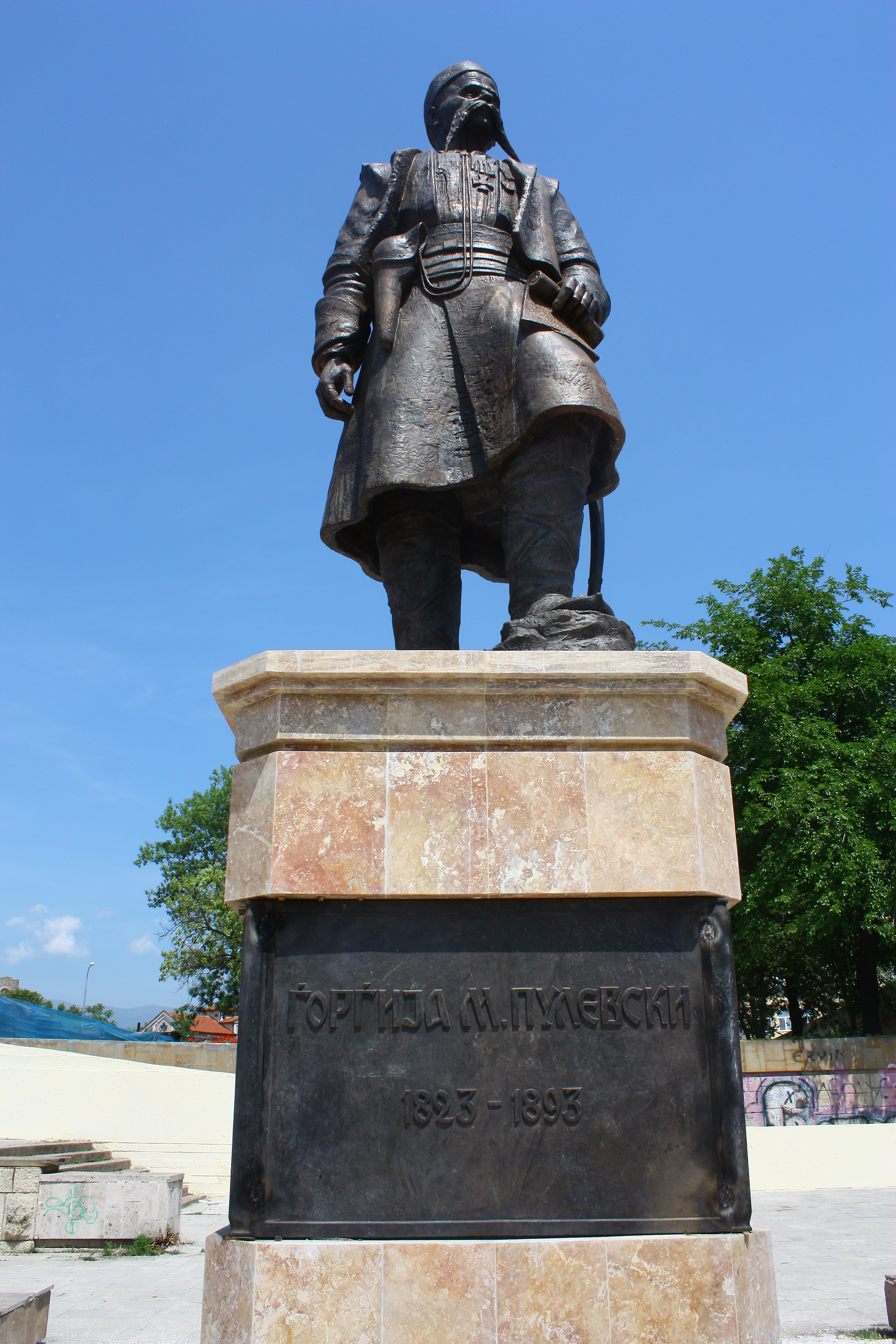
Monument of Gjorgjija M. Pulevski in Skopje

According to anthropological study, his surname is of Vlach origin, as is the case with several other surnames in Mijak territory, which contain the Vlach suffix -ul (present in Pulevci, Gugulevci, Tulevci, Gulovci, Čudulovci, etc.) This opens the possibility they are ancestors of Slavicized Vlachs, migrants from an Albanian settlement.

Pulevski claimed that the Macedonians were descendants of the ancient Macedonians. This opinion was based on the claim that Philip II and Alexander III were of Slavic origin and thus this confirmed the ancient ancestry of the modern Macedonians. These views were criticised by the historian Konstantin Jireček as "foolish". Pulevski considered the Mijaks to be a subgroup of the Macedonians and identified as a "Mijak from Galičnik." Pulevski himself, besides as Macedonian, described himself as a "Serbian patriot" in 1874, and also after 1877 he espoused a mixed Macedono-Bulgarian identity as well. In the Jazitshnica, he viewed Macedonian identity as being a regional phenomenon, similar to Herzegovinians and Thracians. In his grammatical works, he included neologisms that were not included in modern Macedonian and opted for a phonological orthography, inspired by the work of Vuk Karadžić.

Linguist Victor Friedman regards Pulevski as a "complex and modern personality that very well understood the complexities of ethnical-national and civilian-national affiliations in the multilingual and multicultural environment of Macedonia." His work Slavic Macedonian General History was published by the Macedonian Academy of Sciences and Arts in 2003. A monument of him was placed in the center of Skopje in 2011. In North Macedonia, he is celebrated as a contributor in the "National Rebirth". Despite Pulevski being an early adherent of Macedonism, in Bulgaria he is regarded as a Bulgarian. According to Tchavdar Marinov, of the Bulgarian Academy of Sciences, there are reasons to interpret the case of Pulevski as a lack of clear national identity by him, while his numerous self-identifications reveal the absence of a clear national identity among the Slavic portion of the population in the region of Macedonia.

== List of works ==
- Dictionary of three languages - wikisource translation.
- "A dictionary of three languages" on Commons.
- "A dictionary of four languages" on Commons.
- Язичница содержающа старобългарски (македонски) язик, суредена ем исправена за да учат бугарски и македонски синове и кьерки.

== Sources ==
- Daskalov, Rumen; Marinov, Tchavdar (2013). Entangled Histories of the Balkans: Volume One: National Ideologies and Language Policies. BRILL. ISBN 978-90-04-25076-5.
