= Tresonče =

Tresonče Тресонче
- Panoramic view of the village

- Location within North Macedonia
- Country: North Macedonia
- Region: Polog
- Municipality: Mavrovo and Rostuša

Population (2021)
  - Total: 24
- Time zone: UTC+1 (CET)
  - Summer (DST): UTC+2 (CEST)

Tresonče (Macedonian: Тресонче [ˈtrɛsɔnt͡ʃɛ]) is a mountainous village located in the Mavrovo and Rostuša Municipality in western North Macedonia. It is a mountain village populated by Macedonian Orthodox Christians. There are also several Orthodox churches in the village.

== Demographics ==
Tresonče (Trasniça) is attested in the Ottoman defter of 1467 as a village in the ziamet of Reka which was under the authority of Karagöz Bey. The village appears as an uninhabited.

According to the statistics of the Bulgarian ethnographer Vasil Kanchov from 1900, 1320 inhabitants lived in the village of Tresonče, all Bulgarians.

According to the Secretary of the Bulgarian Exarchate Dimitar Mišev ("La Macédoine et sa Population Chrétienne"), in 1905 there were 1680 Bulgarians (exarchists) in Tresonče.

According to a 1929 ethnographic map by Russian Slavist Afanasy Selishchev, Tresonče was a Bulgarian village.

According to the 1942 Albanian census, Tresonče was inhabited by 454 Bulgarians.

The village is traditionally inhabited by the ethnographic group of Mijaks, the inhabitants identifying as ethnic Macedonians (as of the 2021 census; 24 inhabitants).

== Notable people ==
- Dimitar Krstev, known as Dičo Zograf, icon painter
- Dimitar Pandilov - Artist skilled in Macedonian arts, considered the founder of modern Macedonian art.
- Andrey Damyanov - Although not born in Tresonče, his family was from there, he was a very famous architect.
- Josif Mihajlović Jurukovski (1887–1941), mayor of Skopje, born in Tresonče
- Toma Smiljanić-Bradina (1888–1969), Serbian ethnographer, philologist, dramatist and publicist, born in Tresonče
- Sirma Voyvoda, Bulgarian rebel. Considered a national heroine in North Macedonia.
