= Rosoki =

- Village
- Росоки
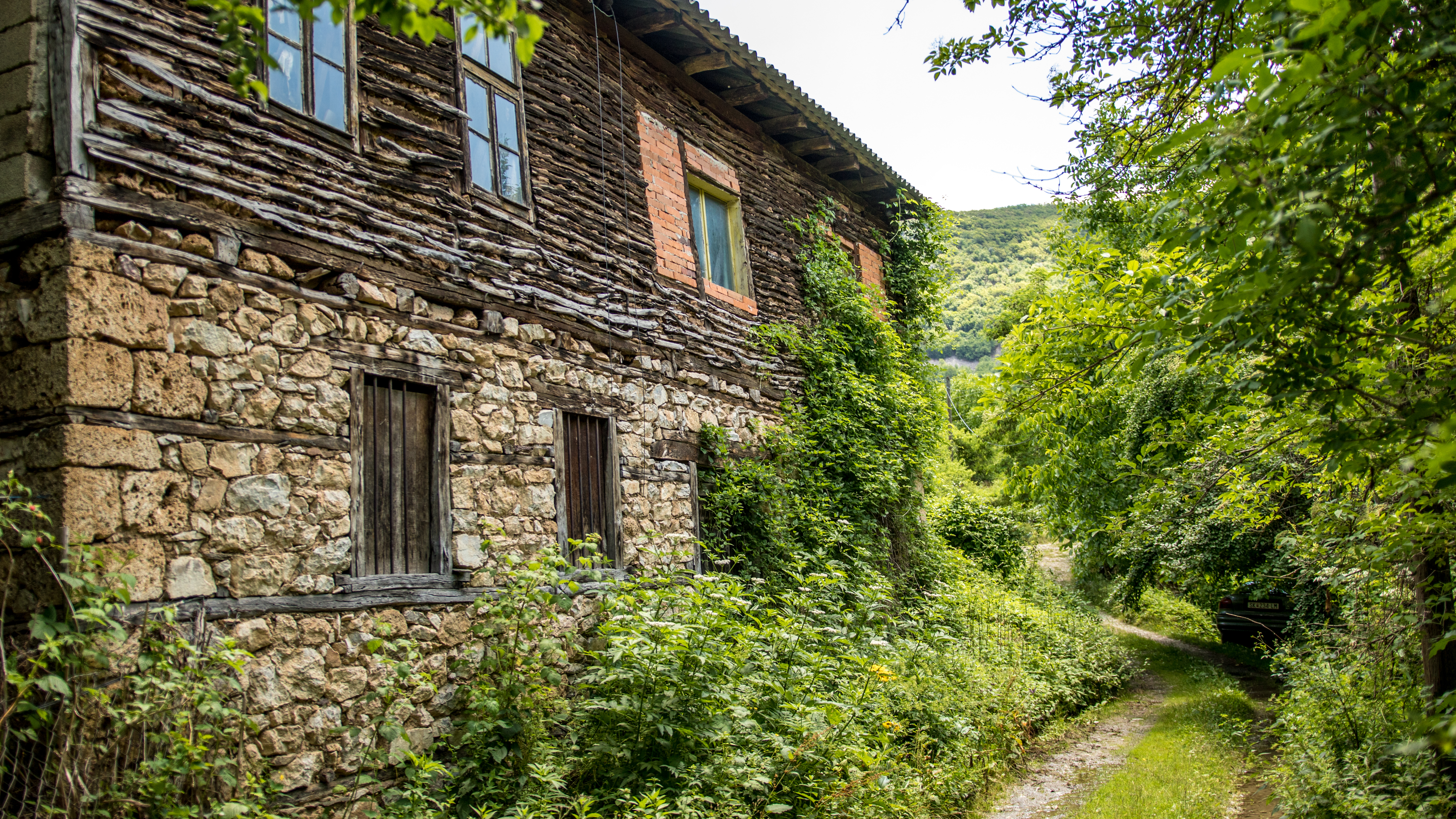

- Location within North Macedonia
- Coordinates: 41.5667°N 20.6942°E
- Country: North Macedonia
- Region: Polog
- Municipality: Mavrovo and Rostuša

Population (2021)
  - Total: 1
- Time zone: UTC+1 (CET)
  - Summer (DST): UTC+2 (CEST)
- Car plates: GV
- Website: .

Rosoki (Macedonian: Росоки) is a village in the municipality of Mavrovo and Rostuša, North Macedonia.

== History ==
Rosoki (Radosaç) is attested in the Ottoman defter of 1467 as a village in the ziamet of Reka which was under the authority of Karagöz Bey. The village had a total of 4 households and the anthroponymy attested was mixed Albanian-Slavic in character, with instances of Slavicisation, e.g Lekë Likarovići.

The entire Christian population of the village is under the rule of Bulgarian Exarchate. According to the Secretary of the Exarchate Dimitar Mishev ("La Macédoine et sa Population Chrétienne”) in 1905 there were 600 Bulgarian Exarchists in Rosoki and a Bulgarian school operated in the village.

According to statistics from the newspaper Debarski Glas in 1911 in Rosoki there were 46 Bulgarian Exarchate houses.

In statistics gathered by Vasil Kanchov in 1900, the village of Rosoki (Raosoki) was inhabited by 450 Christian Bulgarians.

== Demographics ==
As of the 2021 census, Rosoki had 1 resident with the following ethnic composition:

- Macedonians 1

According to the 2002 census, the village had a total of 0 inhabitants.
