= Asen Vasiliev =

Bulgarian artist

Asen Vasiliev Petrov (Асен Василиев; June 2, 1900, Kyustendil - June 21, 1981, Sofia) was a Bulgarian art critic and artist, professor and honorary citizen of Kyustendil.

Member of the Union of Bulgarian Artists. Avatar for the creation of the first Bulgarian regional and local lore encyclopedia of his native Kyustendil region.

Positivist and a researcher of the art of the Bulgarian Revival and in the Balkans in general with his book "Bulgarian Revival Masters". A close friend of Vladimir Dimitrov.

One of the initiators for the celebration of the 1300th Anniversary of the Bulgarian State.
