= Toma Smiljanić-Bradina =

Serbian ethnographer

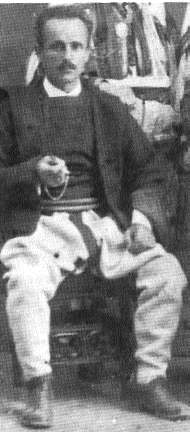
Bradina

Toma Smiljanić (Serbian Cyrillic: Тома Смиљанић; 18 June 1888 in Tresonče, Ottoman Empire – 10 May 1969 in Belgrade, SFR Yugoslavia), known by his nickname Bradina (Брадина), was a Serbian ethnographer, philologist, dramatist and publicist from what is today North Macedonia. He is regarded as an ethnic Macedonian in North Macedonia.

== Early life ==
Smiljanić was born in Tresonče to an old and distinguished family, the Bradinovci, who took its name after his great-grandfather Sardžo Karadža Bradina, a village leader at the beginning of the 19th century. He finished primary school in his native village and then went on to study at the Serbian high school in Thessaloniki where he graduated in 1906. In the next five years he was a teacher in Serb schools in Tresonče, Dolno Melničani and Galičnik. As a holder of a scholarship from the Saint Sava Society in 1911 he started his studies at the Philosophical Faculty in Belgrade.

== Military career ==
At the start of the First Balkans War, Smiljanić left the faculty to join the volunteer unit of Vojvoda Vuk in which he remained for the next four years, fighting with distinction in several battles. After the retreat of the Serbian army to Corfu as a promising student he was sent off to Clermont-Ferrand, France where he studied and graduated geography and history.

He fought in the April War of 1941 and spent the rest of the occupation as a teacher in Aleksinac.

== Work ==
In 1920 he returned and started working as a professor at the grammar schools in Tetovo (1920-1921) and Skopje (1921-1927) and then in Skopje's Trade Academy (1927-1930). From 1924 to 1929 he was the editor of Biblioteka Makedonija in Skopje, which he founded (renamed in 1929 to Starovremska biblioteka). He then went once again to France to finish his doctoral studies and obtained his PhD in 1931. Between 1931 and 1934 he was an MP for Galičnik-Debar county and after that an inspector (1935-1939) and head of the Educational board of Vardar Banate in Skopje.

After his retirement in 1946 he moved to Belgrade. He continued with his scientific research until his death, collaborating with Serbian and Macedonian academy of sciences and arts. Most of his scientific work was directed to studying of his native Mijaci clan, their customs, lands, famous persons.

Apart from scientific work, Smiljanić was also a prose writer and dramatist. Several of his writings, including his memoirs, remain unpublished.

== Bibliography ==
- Na planini i druge pripovetke iz Makedonije, Skopje, 1924
- Stojna i druge pripovetke iz Makedonije, Skopje, 1924
- Plemenske osobine Mijaka, Belgrade 1924
- Sedi kralj, Skopje, 1925
- Kanonska vizitacija Reka, Skopje, 1925
- Mijaci, Gorna Reka i Mavrovsko polje, Belgrade 1926
- Maćedonski pečalbari. Drama u pet činova s pevanjem, Prilep, 1927
- Pesmarica, Skopje, 1929
- Prilozi za poznavanje stočarstva na našim visokim planinama. Belgrade 1932
- Stočarstvo na Bistri, Stogovu, Krčinu i Kobaru, Belgrade 1932
- Pleme Brsjaka, Belgrade 1932
- Kralj slobodar – Kralj mirotvorac, Skopje, 1936
- Idealisti (first act of a drama), „Južni pregled“, Skopje, 1937

== See also ==
- List of Chetnik voivodes
