= Zubovce, Vrapčište =

Zubovce Зубовце Zuboc
- Village
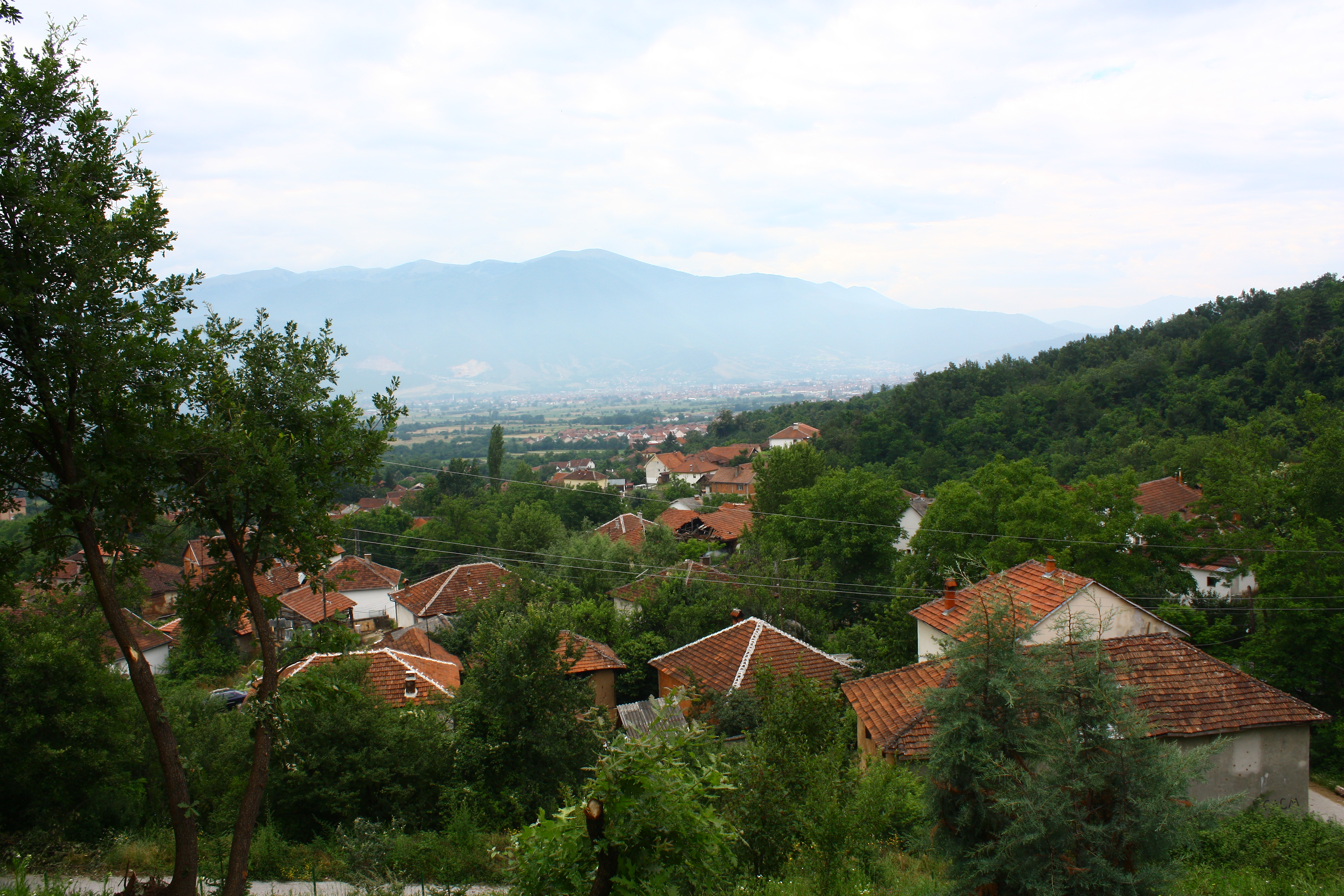

- Location within North Macedonia
- Coordinates: 41°49′45″N 20°52′40″E
- Country: North Macedonia
- Region: Polog
- Municipality: Vrapčište

Population (2002)
  - Total: 844
- Time zone: UTC+1 (CET)
  - Summer (DST): UTC+2 (CEST)
- Car plates: GV
- Website: .

Zubovce (Macedonian: Зубовце, Albanian: Zuboc) is a village in the municipality of Vrapčište, North Macedonia.

== Demographics ==
As of the 2021 census, Zubovce had 844 residents with the following ethnic composition:

- Macedonians 428
- Albanians 278
- Turks 120
- Persons for whom data are taken from administrative sources 15
- Others 3

According to the 2002 census, the village had a total of 762 inhabitants. Ethnic groups in the village include:

- Macedonians 478
- Albanians 223
- Turks 58
- Serbs 2
- Others 1

According to the 1942 Albanian census, Zubovce was inhabited by 722 Serbs and 53 Bulgarians.

In statistics gathered by Vasil Kanchov in 1900, the village of Zubovce was inhabited by 720 Christian Bulgarians.
