= Galičnik dialect =

Dialect of Macedonian

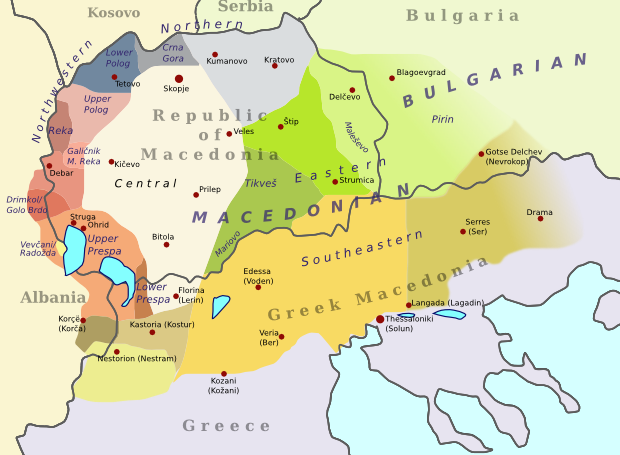
The location of the Galičnik dialect, among the other Macedonian dialects

The Galičnik dialect (Macedonian: Галички дијалект, Galički dijalekt) or Lower Reka dialect (Macedonian: Малорекански дијалект, Malorekanski dijalekt) is a member of the subgroup of western and northwestern dialects of the western group of dialects of Macedonian. The dialect is spoken on a small territory on the mountain Bistra in the western part of North Macedonia. The dialect's name is derived from the biggest village in that area- Galičnik. Also, the dialect is spoken in many other small villages, including the village of Gari. The Galičnik dialect is closely related to the Reka dialect, spoken north-western of the Galičnik dialect. This dialect is well known in North Macedonia because of the archaic words that this dialect has. The dialect can be found in many historically important literary works in Macedonian literature. One of the most important is Ǵorǵija Puleski and his dictionary of three languages.

== Phonological characteristics ==
- Proto-Slavic *ǫ > /o/: *rǫka > рока /ˈroka/ ('hand'), a shibboleth among Macedonian dialects;
- Proto-Slavic syllabic *l̥ > /əl/ ~ /l̩/ ~ /lə/: *žl̥tъ > ж`лт /ʒəlt/ ~ /ʒl̩t/ ('yellow');
- intervocalic Proto-Slavic *x > /j/: *čekaxa > чекаја /ˈt͡ʃekaja/ (3P pl. aor of 'to wait');
- merger of thematic е-group verbs to и-group verbs: јадет /ˈjadet/ → јадит /ˈjadit/ (3P sg. PRS of 'to eat');
- earlier cluster -шт- /ʃt/ → -шч- /ʃt͡ʃ/: што /ʃto/ → шчо /ʃt͡ʃo/ (interr. pron. 'what');
- /ʒ/ instead of /d͡ʒ/ in loanwords: Turkish cam /dʒam/ > жам /ʒam/ ('windowpane'), and
- mostly antepenultimate word stress.

== Morphological characteristics ==
- use of the suffix -ет for 3P pl. PRS: ставает /ˈstavaet/ ('[they are] putting, placing'), јадет /ˈjadet/ ('[they are] eating']), одет /ˈodet/ ('[they are] going');
- use of the suffix -т for 3P sg. PRS: стават /ˈstavat/ ('[he/she/it is] putting, placing'), јадит /ˈjadit/ ('[he/she/it is] eating'), одит /ˈodit/ ('[he/she/it is] going');
- use of the immutable particle ќа /ca/ with [conjugated] verbs to form future tenses: ќа одам /ca ˈodam/ ('I will go'), and
- use of the preposition в(о) /v(o)/ ('in, inside, to').

== Examples of the dialect ==
Traditional song from Galičnik, that is sung on the holiday Vasilica:

Сурова, сурова година;
Весела, весела година;
Ж`лт мајмун на леса;
П`лна куќа коприна;
Живо-здраво, живо-здраво;
До година, до амина!
