= Saint Jovan Bigorski Monastery =

Monastery in North Macedonia

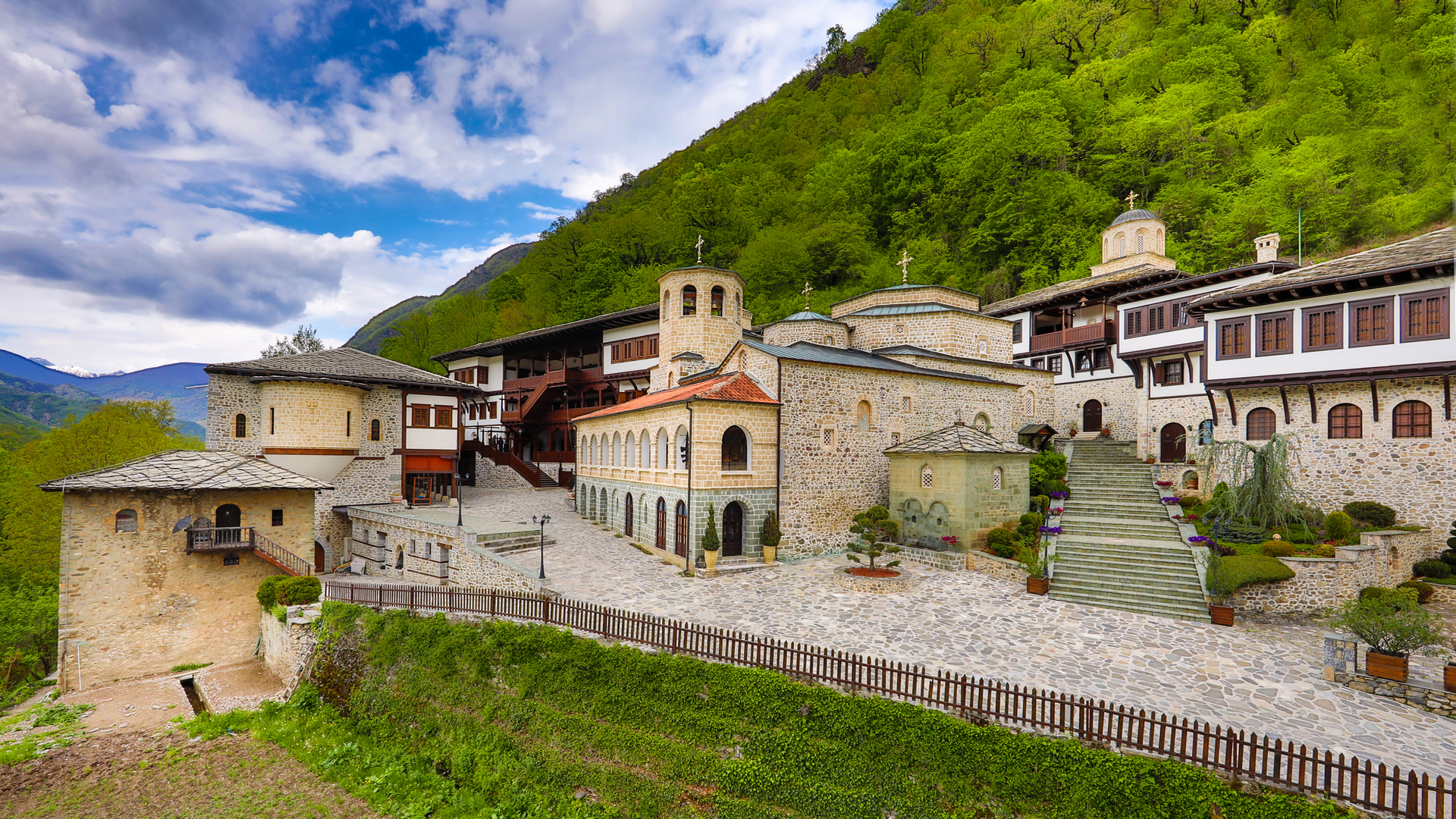
- Interactive map of Saint Jovan Bigorski Monastery

Monastery information
- Order: Macedonian Orthodox
- Established: 1020
- Diocese: Diocese of Debar and Kičevo
- Controlled churches: Church of St John the Baptist

People
- Founder: John of Debar

Site
- Location: Mavrovo and Rostuša Municipality
- Country: North Macedonia
- Coordinates: 41°37′19″N 20°36′42″E
- Public access: yes

The Monastery of Saint Jovan Bigorski (Macedonian: Свети Јован Бигорски) is a Macedonian Orthodox monastery located in western North Macedonia, near the road connecting the towns of Debar and Gostivar.

The monastery church is dedicated to St. John the Baptist. It includes the iconostasis, created by Mijak wood-carvers and is an example of wood-carved iconostasis in the region.

== History ==
Bigorski Monastary in 1908

The most popular thesis is that the monastery was founded in 1020 and the construction of the monastery's building has been attributed to Bulgarian clergyman John of Debar, first Archbishop of Ohrid.

In the 16th century, during the rule of Ottoman sultan Selim II, the monastery became almost completely ruined. In 1743, Illarion, a monk and later the prior of the monastery, restored the monastery and its brotherhood. In 1814, under Archimandrite Arsenius, the monastery was expanded with the construction a large dormitory and a dining room. Arsenius was also responsible for a commemorative book and the creation of a coffin for the relics of saints. The modern facade of the monastery originates from between the end and beginning of the 18th and 19th centuries. Apart from the church, the monastery contains a charnel house, defense tower, and dormitories. The iconostasis was created by the Mijak wood-carvers Petre Filipov-Garkata, his brother Marko, Makarij Frchkovski, and Avram Dichov, along with his sons Vasil and Filip. The iconostasis was made of walnut wood and was produced in the period between 1829 and 1835. Scenes from the Old and New Testaments were engraved, consisting of animals and birds interwoven with floral ornaments. Among Christians, there is a belief in the healing power of the icon of St. John the Baptist in the monastery. Records mention a monk named Iov, believed by some researchers to be Yoakim Karchovski, writer and educator involved in the cultural and religious revival of the region.

The center chapel in the St Jovan Bigorski Monastery, North Macedonia

The older sections of the monastery were destroyed by a fire in 2009, while the church and newer buildings were preserved. Reconstruction began in 2010, preserving the original architectural style.
