= House of Riste and Blaže Melovski =

Historical House in North Macedonia

- Куќа на Милош и Динго Меловски; Kukja na Riste and Blaže Melovski (Macedonian)
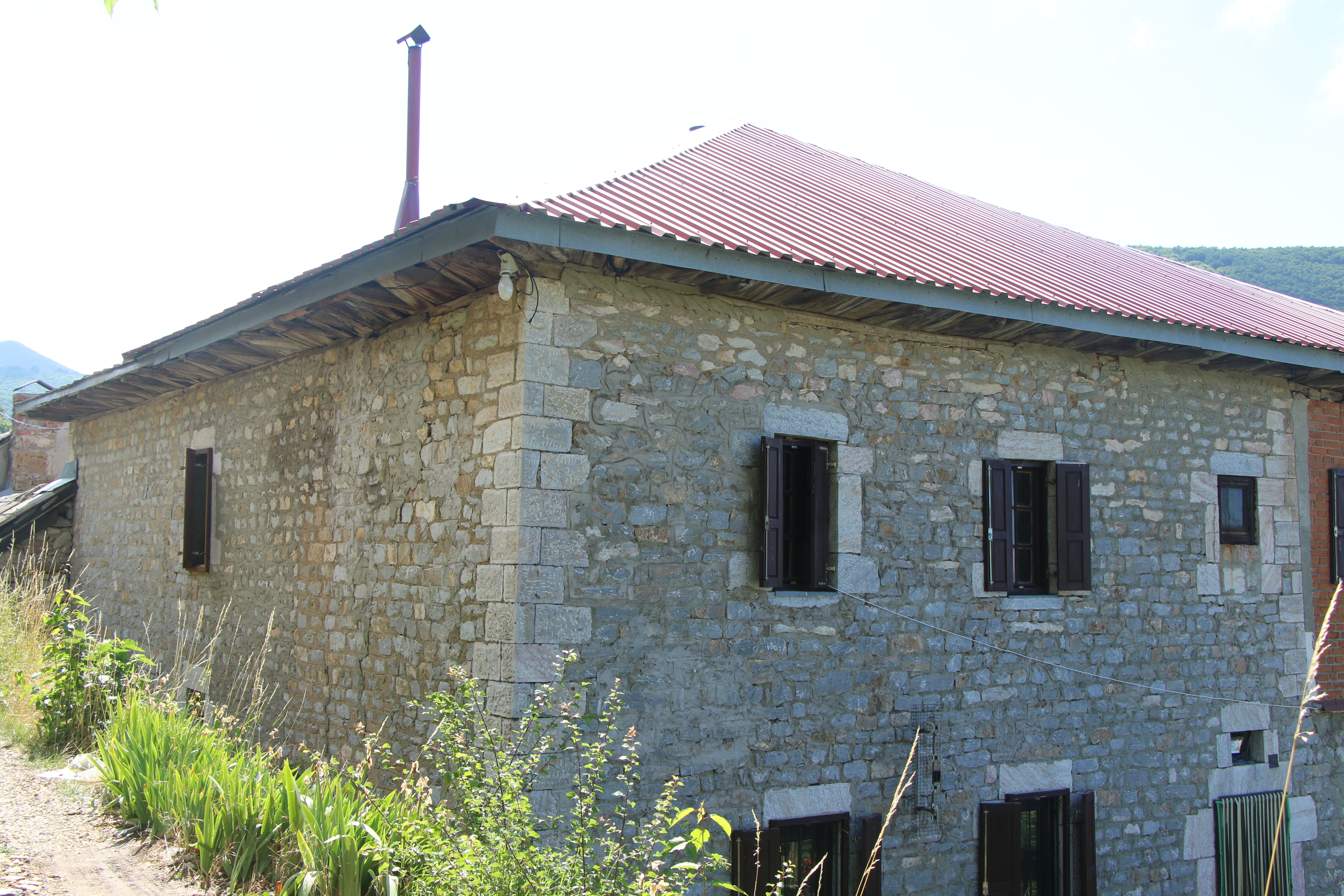
- Interactive map of House of Riste and Blaže Melovski
- 41°35′40.03″N 20°39′18.55″E
- Type: House
- Location: Galičnik, North Macedonia

Site notes
- Governing body: Office for Protection of Cultural Heritage, Ministry of Culture
- Owner: Melovski family

The House of Riste and Blaže Melovski is a historical house in Galičnik that is listed as Cultural heritage of North Macedonia. It is in ownership of the two branches of the family of Melovski.

== History ==
=== Notable members of the family ===
Jovan Meloski - teacher and principal of the Galičnik school. His house, located south-east of this house, is also listed as Cultural heritage of North Macedonia.

== See also ==
- House of Kuze Frčkovski
- House of Mane Šulevski
- House of Petre and Mile Želčevski
- House of Velimir Gjinovski
- House of Mitre Gjozinski and Velimir Čangovski
- House of Gjorgje Karanovski
- House of Gjorgji Pulevski
