= List of people from Gostivar =

Below is a list of notable people born in Gostivar, North Macedonia, or its surroundings:

== Historical figures ==
- Petar Novaković Čardaklija, diplomat in the First Serbian Uprising
- Bajazid Doda, Albanian ethnographic writer
- Xhem Hasa, nationalist and member of the Balli Kombëtar
- Voisava Tripalda, mother of Skanderbeg
- Atanas Albanski/Thanas Shqiptari, Bulgarian-Albanian revolutionary
- Ismail Strazimiri, Albanian revolutionary

== Sports figures ==
- Amir Bilali, football player
- Lutfi Bilali, football player
- Argjend Beqiri, football player
- Imran Fetai, football player
- Rudi Gusnić, football manager and former player
- Shaban Ismaili, footballer
- Shkodran Mustafi, footballer
- Admir Mehmedi, football player
- Nazmi Mehmeti, wrestler
- Gentjana Rochi, football player
- Nuri Seferi, boxer, reigning WBO European Cruiserweight Champion
- Nezbedin Selimi, footballer
- Marjan Janeski, basketball player
- Viktor Efremovski, basketball player
- Stojan Gjuroski, basketball player

== Academics ==
- Haralampije Polenaković, literary historian
- Jovan Trifunoski, Serbian geographer

== Artist ==
- Mladen Srbinović, Serbian painter

== Politicians ==
- Azir Aliu, Albanian Macedonian politician and Health Minister
- Adnan Jashari, Albanian politician
- Arben Taravari, Albanian Macedonian doctor and mayor of Gostivar.
