= House of Gjorgje Karanovski =

- Куќа на Ѓорѓе Карановски; Kukja na Gjorgje Karanovski (Macedonian)
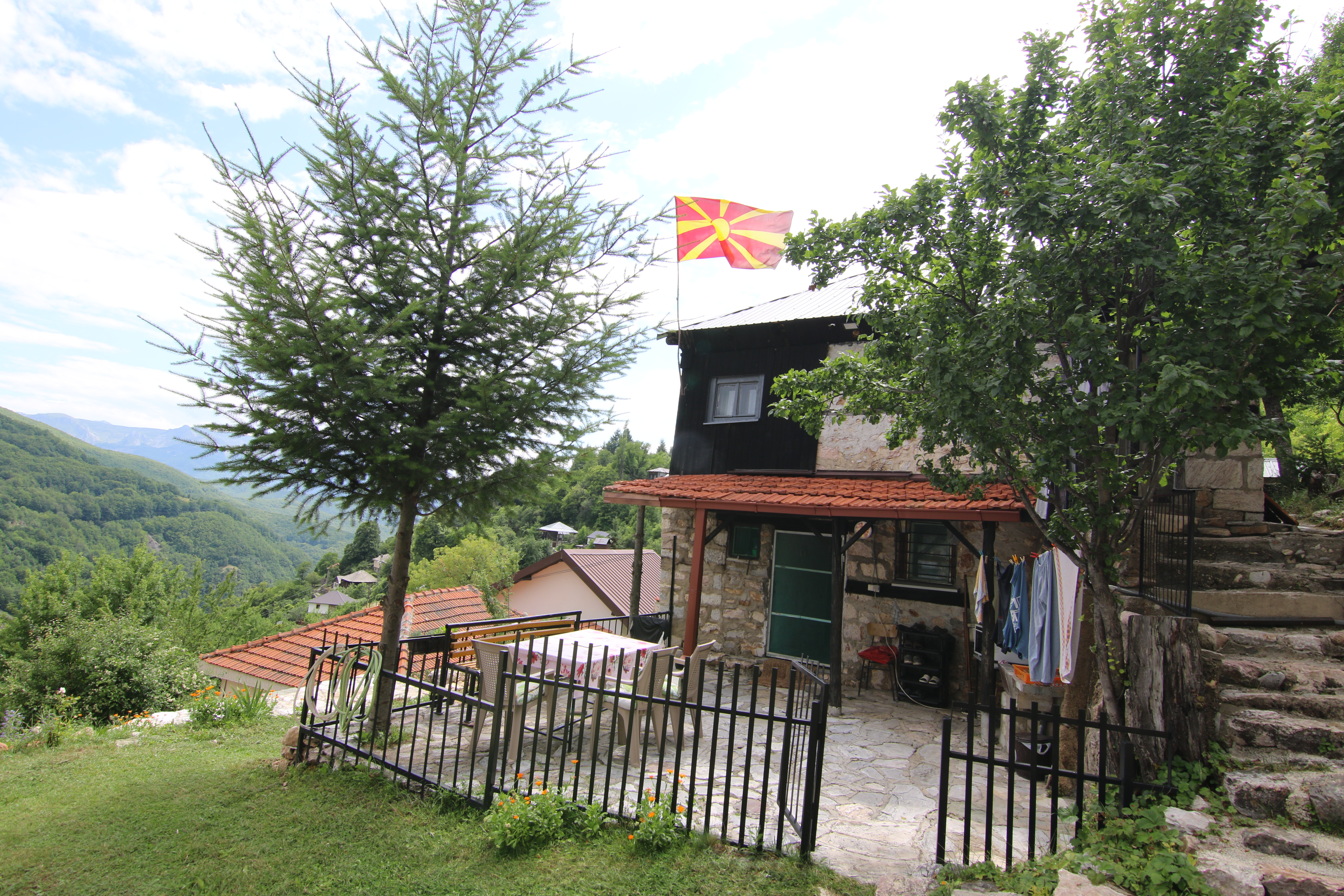
- Interactive map of House of Gjorgje Karanovski
- 41°35′41.11″N 20°38′59.72″E
- Type: House
- Location: Galičnik, North Macedonia

Site notes
- Governing body: Office for Protection of Cultural Heritage, Ministry of Culture
- Owner: Karanovski family

The House of Gjorgje Karanovski is a historical house in Galičnik that is listed as Cultural heritage of North Macedonia. It is in ownership of one branch of the family of Karanovski.

== Family history ==
The family of Karanovski shares roots with the families of Karkinci and Čalovci.

== See also ==
- House of Kuze Frčkovski
- House of Mane Šulevski
- House of Petre and Mile Želčevski
- House of Velimir Gjinovski
- House of Mitre Gjozinski and Velimir Čangovski
- House of Riste and Blaže Melovski
- House of Gjorgji Pulevski
