= House of Gjorgji Pulevski =

- Куќа на Ѓорѓија Пулевски; Kukja na Gjorgjija Pulevski (Macedonian)
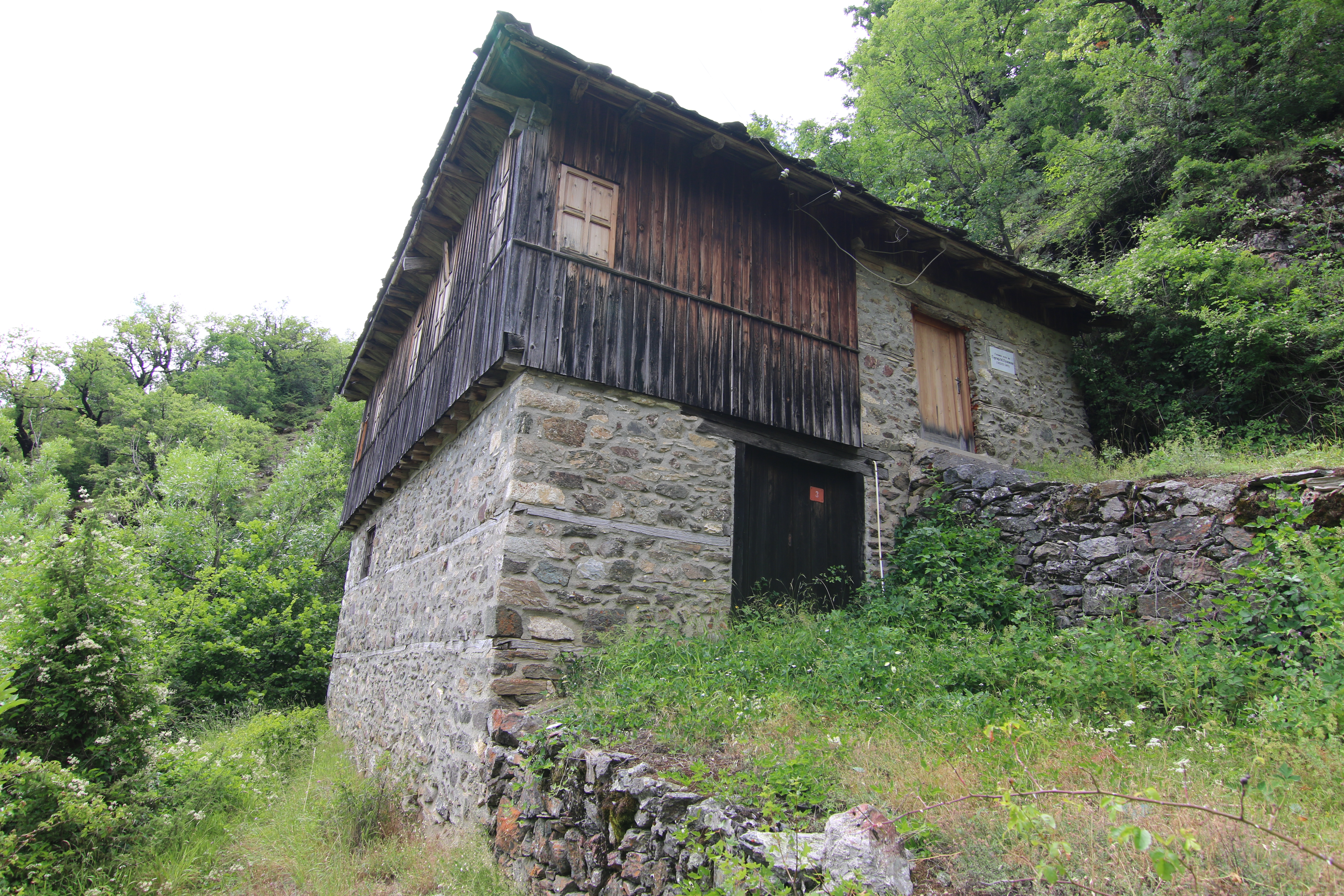
- Interactive map of House of Gjorgji Pulevski
- 41°35′28.47″N 20°38′50.16″E
- Type: House
- Location: Galičnik, North Macedonia

Site notes
- Governing body: Museum of Macedonia

The House of Gjorgji Pulevski is a historical house in Galičnik that is listed as Cultural heritage of North Macedonia. It is the birth house of the Macedonian writer, lexicographer, historian, and military leader Gjorgji Pulevski.

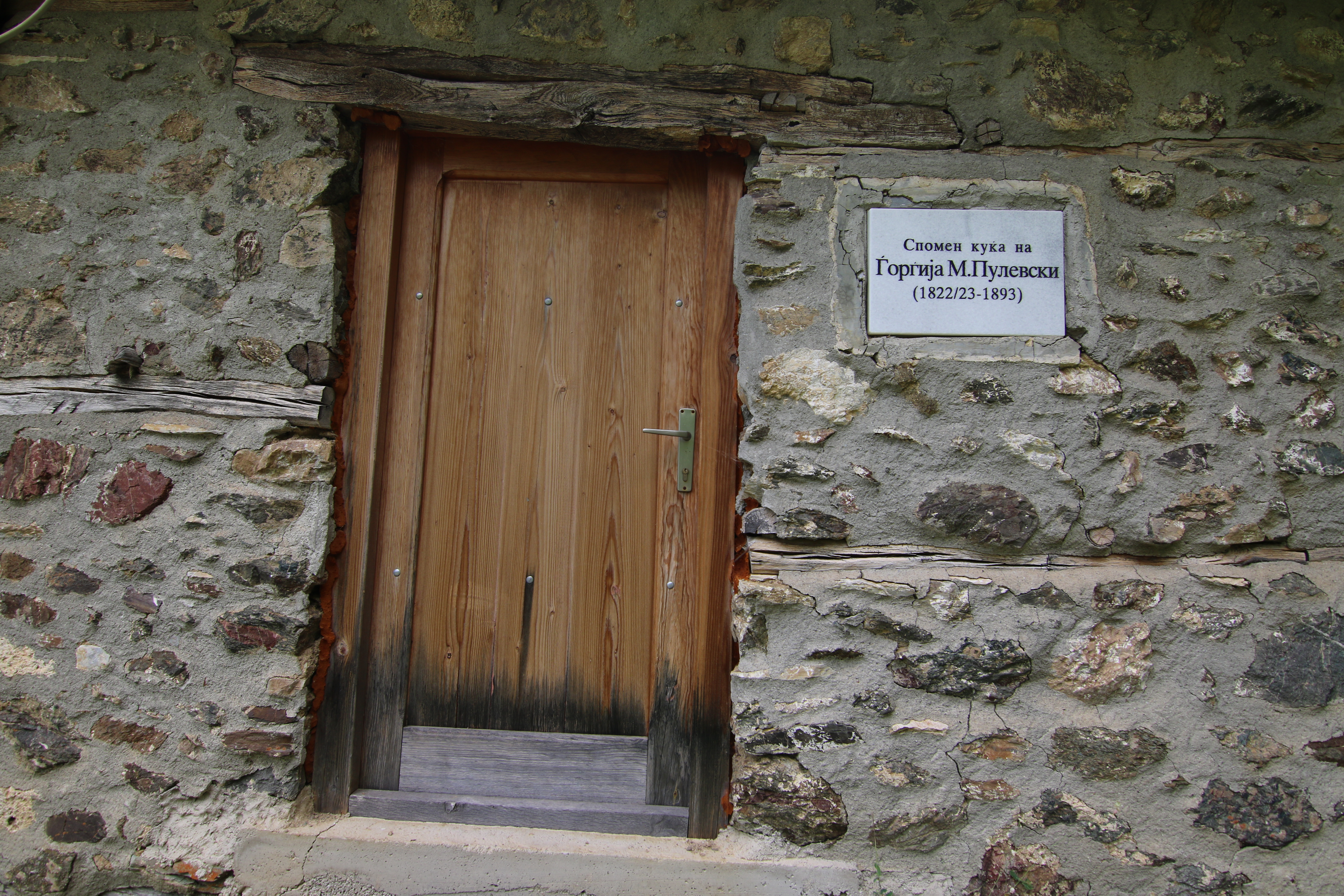
The entrance door of the house.

== Family history ==
According to the local igoumen named Todor, the family is quite old and settled in Galičnik, alongside the families of Cergovski and Žantevski. Family of Pulevski are progenitors of the neighbourhood of Tomovo, also called Tortesko Maalo (lit. Torte Neighbourhood).

=== Notable members of the family ===
- Gjorgjija Pulevski ― the most notable member of this family. Pulevski was born in 1817 in Galičnik, then under the rule of the Ottoman Empire, and died in 1895 in Sofia, Principality of Bulgaria. Trained as a stonemason who worked in modern-day Romania, he became a self-taught writer in matters relating to the Macedonian language and culture. He was a writer and revolutionary, known today as the first author to express publicly the idea of a Macedonian nation distinct from Bulgarian, as well as a separate Macedonian language.
- Velika Pulevska ― daughter of Gjorgjija Pulevski. She was killed and robberd at the Radika river.
- Gjorgo Pulevski ― a member of the Communist Party of Yugoslavia and member of the League of Communist Youth of Yugoslavia during the late Interwar Period.

== See also ==
- House of Kuze Frčkovski
- House of Mane Šulevski
- House of Petre and Mile Želčevski
- House of Velimir Gjinovski
- House of Mitre Gjozinski and Velimir Čangovski
- House of Gjorgje Karanovski
- House of Riste and Blaže Melovski
- Galičnik Wedding Festival
