= House of Mane Šulevski =

Historic site in Macedonia

- Куќа на Мане Шулевски; Kukja na Mane Šulevski (Macedonian)
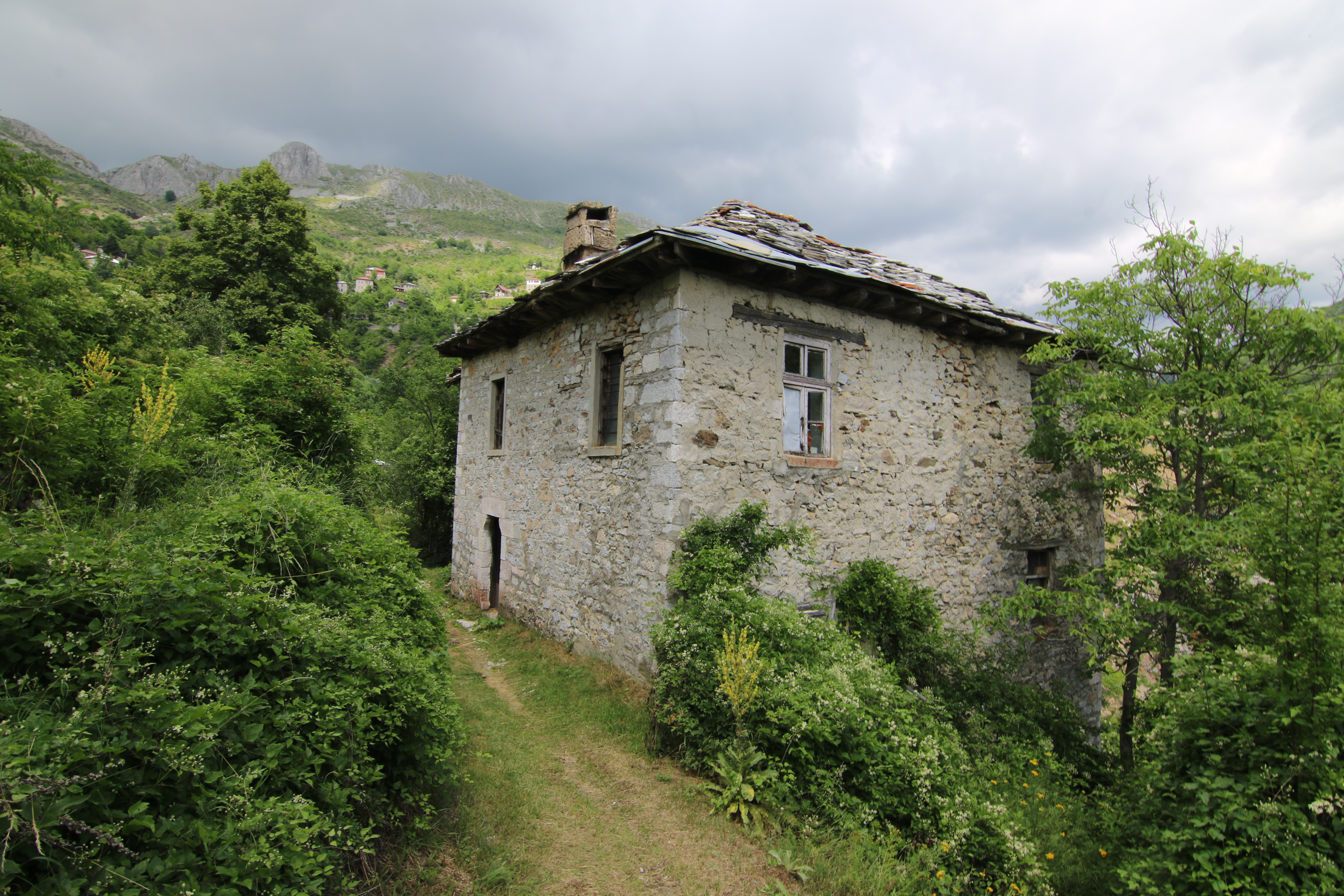
- Interactive map of House of Mane Šulevski
- 41°35′29.96″N 20°38′59.9″E
- Type: House
- Location: Galičnik, North Macedonia

Site notes
- Governing body: Office for Protection of Cultural Heritage, Ministry of Culture
- Owner: Šulevski family

The House of Mane Šulevski is a historical house in Galičnik that is listed as Cultural heritage of North Macedonia. It is in ownership of one branch of the family of Šulevski.

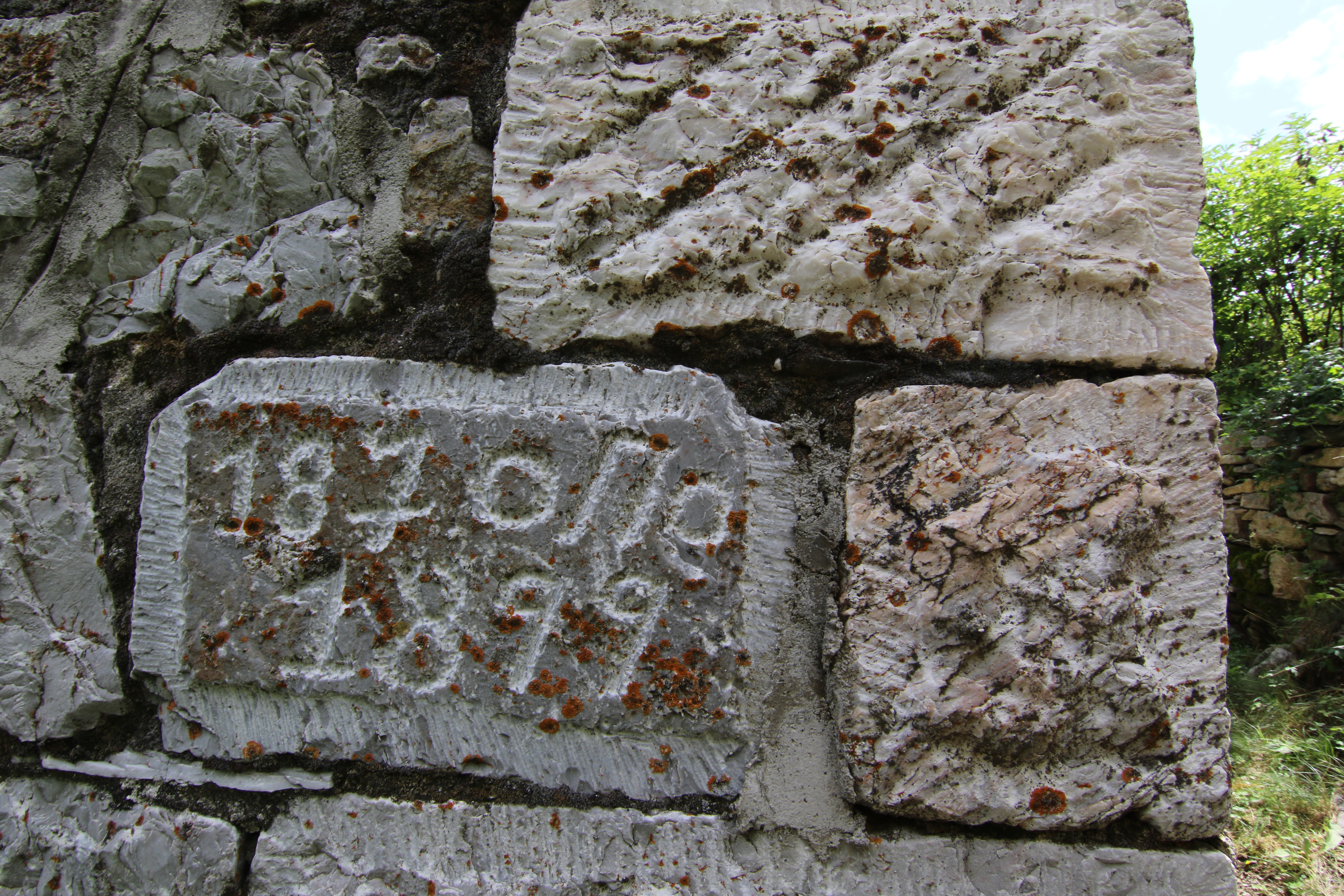
A stone inscription on the corner of the house.

== Family history ==
=== Notable members of the family ===
- Stefo Šuleski ― а shepperd. He worked for Jovan Filipovski who was a local sheep owner. He was killed by bandits in 1909 near the local sheepfold called Nikiforica.
- Unnamed male who was killed and robbed by bandit in the place called Stopanče.

== See also ==
- House of Kuze Frčkovski
- House of Gjorgji Pulevski
- House of Petre and Mile Želčevski
- House of Velimir Gjinovski
- House of Mitre Gjozinski and Velimir Čangovski
- Galičnik Wedding Festival
