= Perko =

Perko is a surname. Notable people with the surname include:

- Aapo Perko (1924–2021), Finnish shot putter
- Franc Perko (1929—2008), theologian, archbishop and metropolitan of Belgrade
- John Perko (American football, born 1914), American football player
- John Perko (American football, born 1918), American football player
- Jukka Perko (born 1968), Finnish saxophonist
- Kenneth Perko (born 1943), Knot theorist
  - Perko pair, knot theory
- Mike Perko (born 1957), American football player
- Rok Perko (born 1985), Slovenian alpine skier
- Roman Perko (born 1977), Slovenian skier
- Tom Perko (born 1954), American football player
- Valentin Perko (born 1950), Slovenian cinematographer and director of photography

== See also ==
- Lynn Perko-Truell (born 1964), American musician
- Perko Kolevski (1944–2021), Macedonian doctor and politician
