= House of Petre and Mile Želčevski =

- Куќа на Петре и Миле Желчевски; Kukja na Petre i Mile Želčevski (Macedonian)
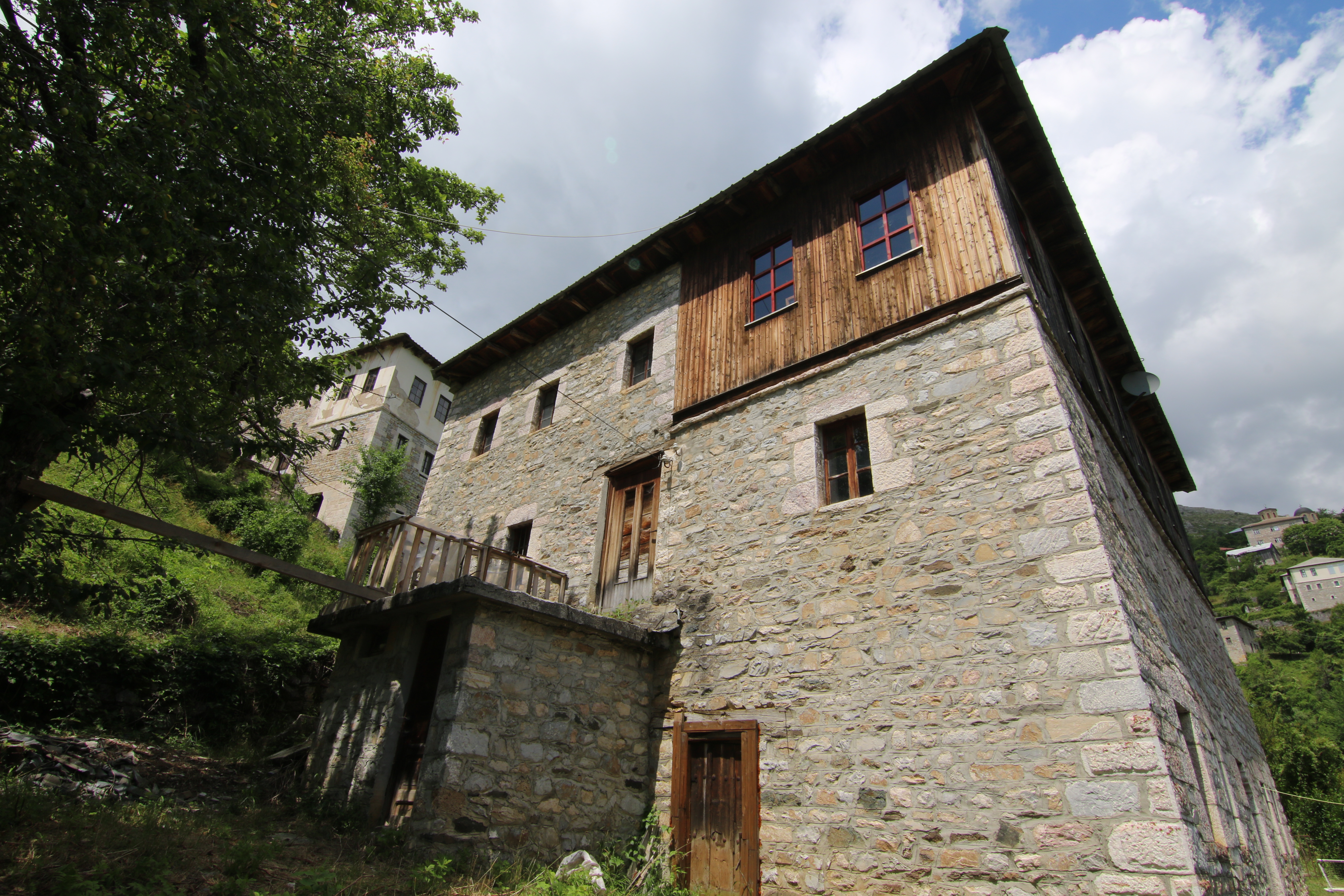
- Interactive map of House of Petre and Mile Želčevski
- 41°35′32.88″N 20°39′00.87″E
- Type: House
- Location: Galičnik, North Macedonia

History
- Built: 1909; 117 years ago

Site notes
- Governing body: Office for Protection of Cultural Heritage, Ministry of Culture
- Owner: Želčevski and Graorkovski families

The House of Petre and Mile Želčevski is a historical house in Galičnik that is listed as Cultural heritage of North Macedonia. It is in ownership of one branch of the families of Želčevski and Graorkovski.

== History of the family ==
The family of Želčevski stems from the family of Ognenovci. From Ognenovci, they share roots with the families of Karadakovci, Luzevci, Marevci, Ževairovci, Bundalevci, Venovci, Šotarovci, Bislimovci and Tripunovci.

=== Notable members of the family ===
- Mile Želčeski (1903-1986) ― migrant worker living in Cairo, Egypt. During an official visit of the Yugoslav president Josip Broz Tito in Egypt, he used to be Tito's translator from Arabic to Serbo-Croatian and vice versa.
- Risto Želčeski ― the first Macedonian graduate of economics at the Sorbonne Faculty.

== History and characteristics of the house ==
The house of the Cairo migrant workers Petre and Mile Želčeski was built in 1909 by their father Trpko. The building is a stone cube that sprouts from the steep terrain. The house basically has dimensions of 13 × 10.5 m and was developed in height of three floors, using the terrain configuration to fit the basement, ground floor and first floor. Thus, four entrances were created, two of which were made of stone monumental portals. In a constructive sense, the building is primarily built of load-bearing stone walls (thickness of 90 cm), partially bondruk construction with bolme walls (thickness of 15 cm), wooden mezzanine and ceiling wooden construction. In the house there is a clear differentiation in the functional sense of the premises. In the basement there are two grocery stores - one shop for each brother, one storeroom and wooden stairs on the ground floor. Considering that the building is built to be inhabited by two brothers with their families on the ground floor and the first floor has the following rooms: of both families, on the first floor there are two bedrooms, a guest house, a small chapel and the most impressive thing is the large common balcony 4 × 13 m with two entrances and 12 windows. On the facade around the whole loggia are placed wooden planks - curtains that correspond to the stone.

== See also ==
- House of Kuze Frčkovski
- House of Mane Šulevski
- House of Gjorgji Pulevski
- House of Velimir Gjinovski
- House of Mitre Gjozinski and Velimir Čangovski
- Galičnik Wedding Festival
