= Gorno Jelovce =

Gorno Jelovce Горно Јеловце Jalloc i Epërm
- Village
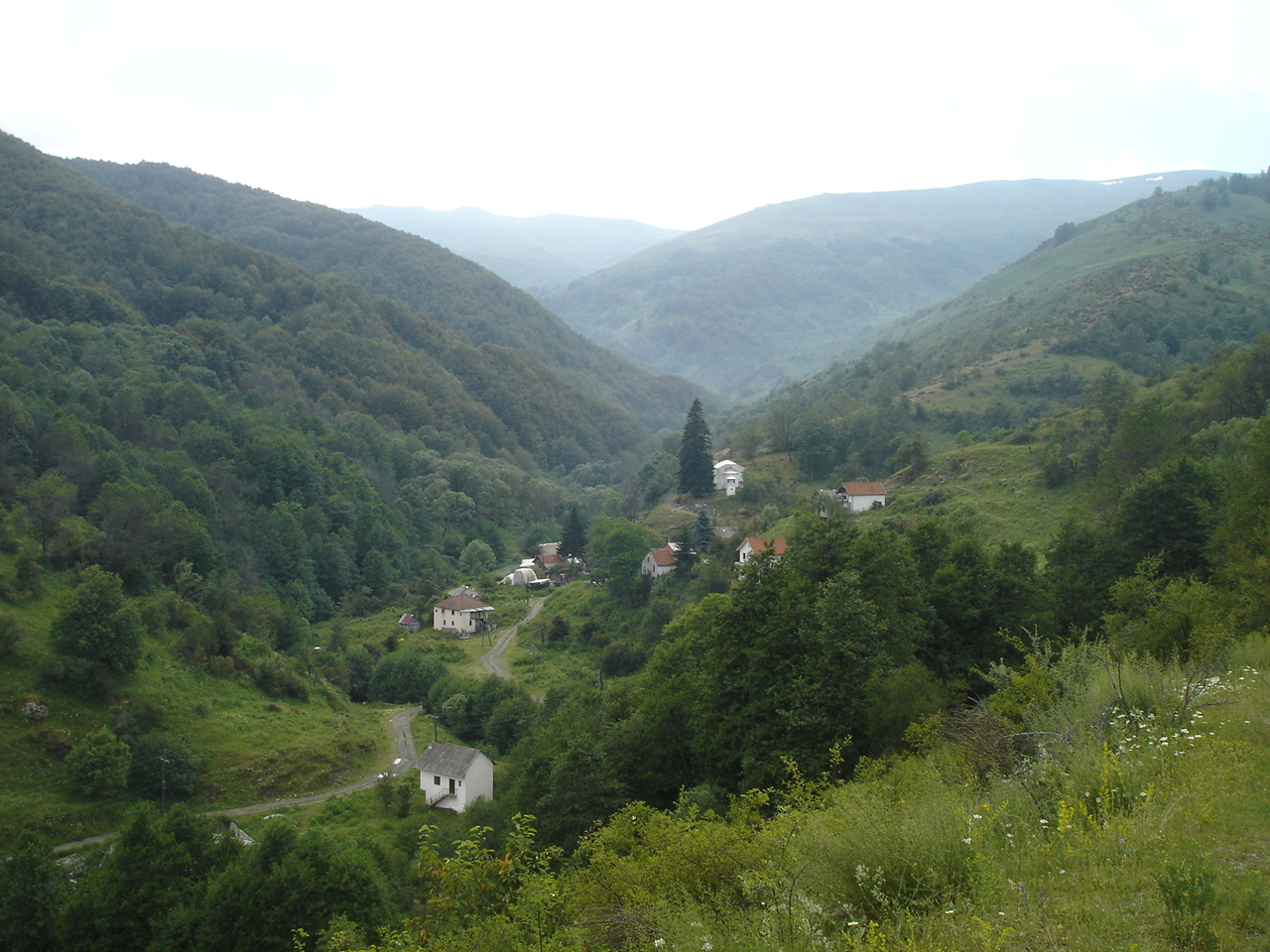
- Gorno Jelovce

- Location within North Macedonia
- Coordinates: 41°48′N 20°47′E
- Country: North Macedonia
- Region: Polog
- Municipality: Gostivar

Population (2021)
  - Total: 4
- Time zone: UTC+1 (CET)
  - Summer (DST): UTC+2 (CEST)
- Car plates: GV
- Website: .

Gorno Jelovce (Macedonian: Горно Јеловце, Albanian: Jalloc i Epërm) is a village in the municipality of Gostivar, North Macedonia.

== Demographics ==
Traditionally Gorno Jelovce is part of the Upper Polog region although it has also been associated with belonging to Upper Reka, due to linguistic affiliations and cultural connections. The population of Gorno Jelovce has consisted over time of Muslim and Orthodox people that are Albanian speakers and in contemporary times are also bilingual in Macedonian.

The Yugoslav census of 1953 recorded 275 people of whom 253 were Macedonians and 22 were Albanians. The Yugoslav census of 1961 recorded 197 people of whom 185 were Macedonians and 12 were Albanians. The village was without inhabitants during the Yugoslav censuses of 1971 and 1981. The Macedonian census of 1994 recorded 2 people who self-declared as Macedonians.

As of the 2021 census, Gorno Jelovce had 4 residents with the following ethnic composition:

- Macedonians 4

According to the 2002 census, the village had a total of 2 inhabitants. Ethnic groups in the village include:

- Macedonians 2

== Notable people ==
- Atanas Albanski
