= Lutfi Bilali =

Macedonian footballer (born 1992)

Personal information
- Date of birth: 14 April 1992 (age 34)
- Place of birth: Gostivar, Macedonia
- Height: 1.85 m (6 ft 1 in)
- Position: Left winger

Team information
- Current team: Arsimi

Youth career
- –2011: Gostivari

Senior career*
| Years | Team | Apps | (Gls) |
| 2011–2012 | Gostivari | | |
| 2012 | Interblock | 5 | (1) |
| 2012–2013 | Celje | 15 | (2) |
| 2013–2014 | Gostivari | 21 | (2) |
| 2014–2015 | Metalurg Skopje | 8 | (0) |
| 2015 | Pelister | 13 | (1) |
| 2015–2016 | Gostivari | | |
| 2016 | Sileks | 9 | (0) |
| 2016–2017 | Vëllazërimi 77 | | |
| 2017 | Haka | 9 | (1) |
| 2017–2018 | Aiginiakos | 8 | (0) |
| 2018–2020 | Renova | 14 | (0) |
| 2020–2021 | Arbëria | 13 | (2) |
| 2021 | Partizán Bardejov | 14 | (7) |
| 2022–2023 | Besa Dobërdoll | | |
| 2023–2024 | Vardar | 5 | (0) |
| 2024–2025 | Arsimi | | |

International career
| 2012 | Macedonia U21 | 1 | (0) |
- * Club domestic league appearances and goals as of 27 September 2025

Lutfi Bilali (born 14 April 1992) is a professional footballer who last played as a left winger for Arsimi in the Macedonian First League.
