= Galate, Vrapčište =

Galate Галате Gallatë
- Village
- Location within North Macedonia
- Coordinates: 41°50′N 20°53′E
- Country: North Macedonia
- Region: Polog
- Municipality: Vrapčište

Population (2021)
  - Total: 980
- Time zone: UTC+1 (CET)
  - Summer (DST): UTC+2 (CEST)
- Car plates: GV
- Website: .

Galate (Macedonian: Галате, Albanian: Gallatë) is a village in the municipality of Vrapčište, North Macedonia.

== Demographics ==
Galate is attested in the 1467/68 Ottoman tax registry (defter) for the Nahiyah of Kalkandelen. The village had a total of 55 Christian households and 3 bachelors.

As of the 2021 census, Galate had 980 residents with the following ethnic composition:

- Albanians 461
- Macedonians 296
- Turks 214
- Persons for whom data are taken from administrative sources 6
- Others 3

According to the 2002 census, the village had a total of 1151 inhabitants. Ethnic groups in the village include:

- Albanians 643
- Macedonians 334
- Turks 173
- Serbs 1
