= Volkovija, Brvenica =

Volkovija Волковија
- Village
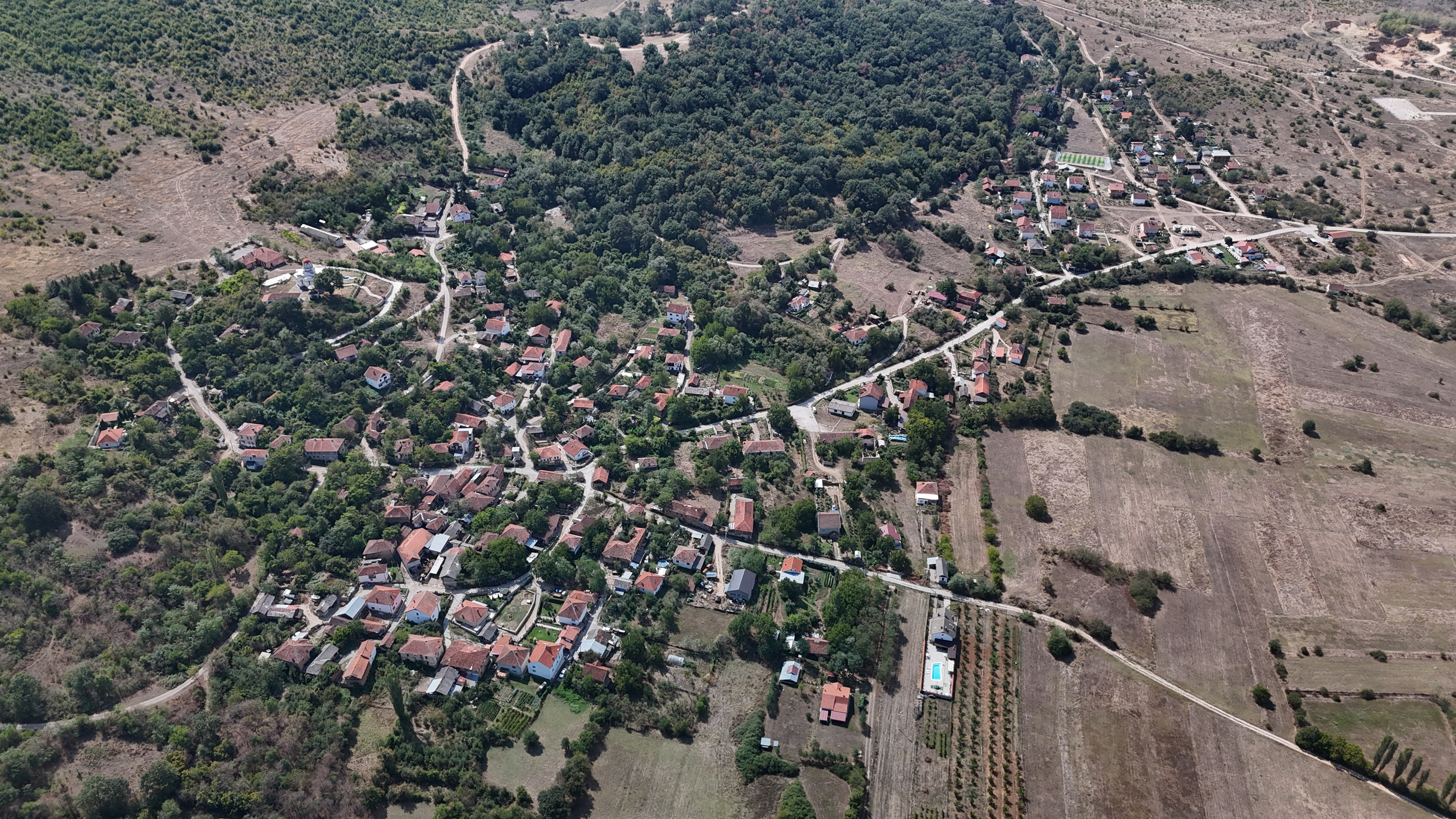
- Air view of the village

- Location within North Macedonia
- Country: North Macedonia
- Region: Polog
- Municipality: Brvenica

Population (2002)
  - Total: 270
- Time zone: UTC+1 (CET)
  - Summer (DST): UTC+2 (CEST)
- Car plates: TE
- Website: .

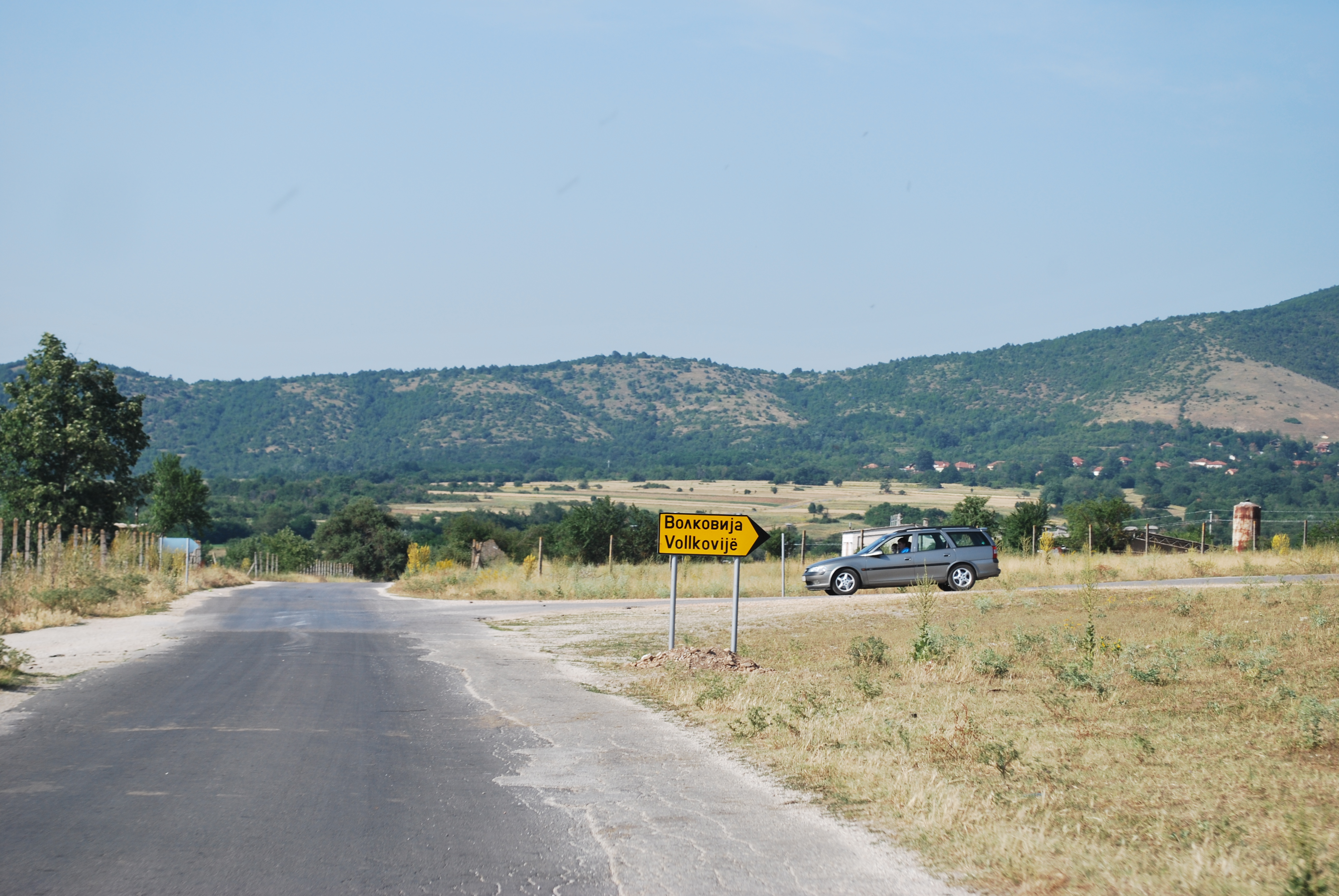
Turning to the village of Volkovija

Volkovija (Macedonian: Волковија) is a mountain village in the Republic of North Macedonia, part of the Municipality of Brvenica.

== Population ==
Volkovija is attested in the 1467/68 Ottoman tax registry (defter) for the Nahiyah of Kalkandelen. The village had a total of 35 Christian households, four bachelors and four widows, as well as five Muslim households.

Volkovija is a relatively small village holding a population of 270 people. The ethnic composition of the village is Macedonian.

In statistics gathered by Vasil Kanchov in 1900, the village of Volkovija (Volkovie) was inhabited by 640 Christian Bulgarians.

== Origins and etymology ==
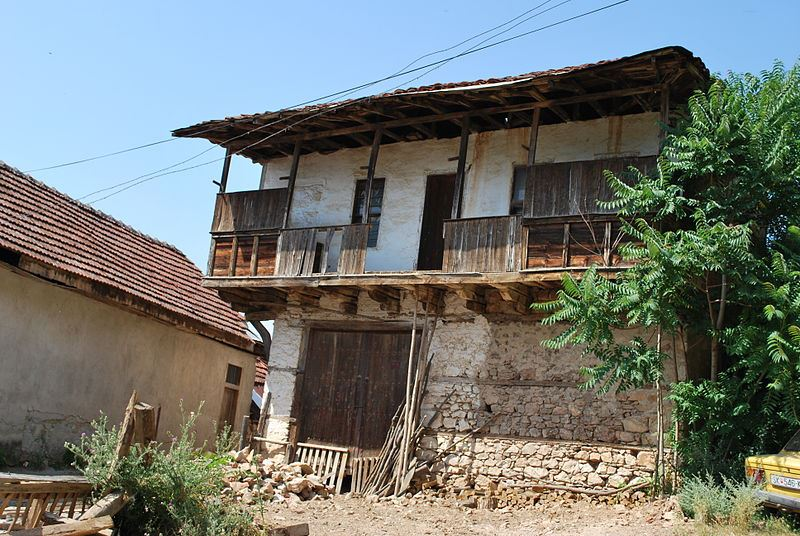
Traditional old village house

The village as such is mentioned for the first time in written text in 1348 (14th century). There are number of interpretations about the origins of the name “Volkovija”. In Macedonian it comes from the word “volk” (wolf) which suggests that in the past the place where today Volkovija is was empty wilderness with many wolves. This however is contested by authors like Viktor Rafajlovski who argues that such a view is illogical mainly because in the past the village area was a home to highly important monastery.

== Gallery ==
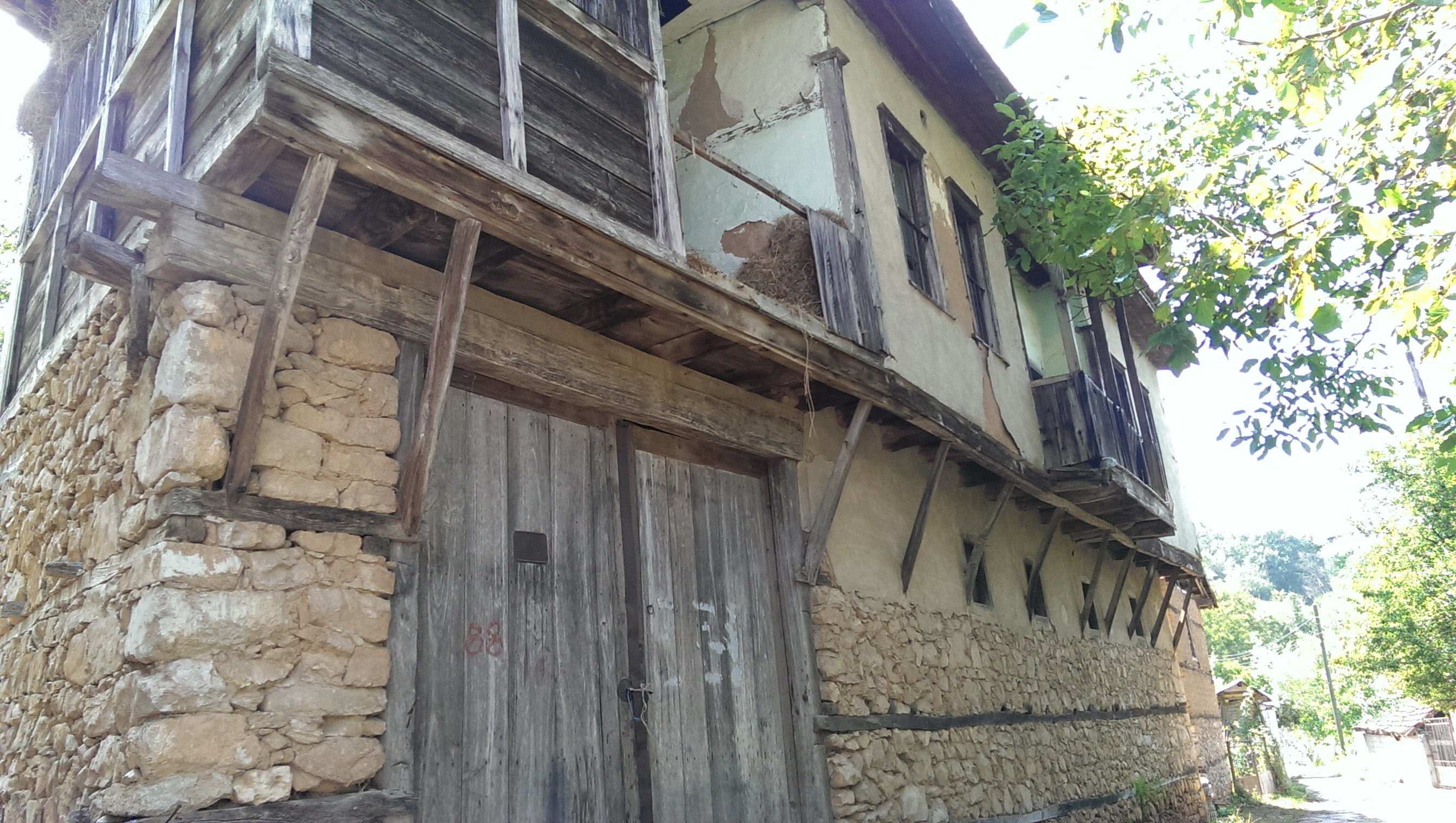
Architecture Volkovija

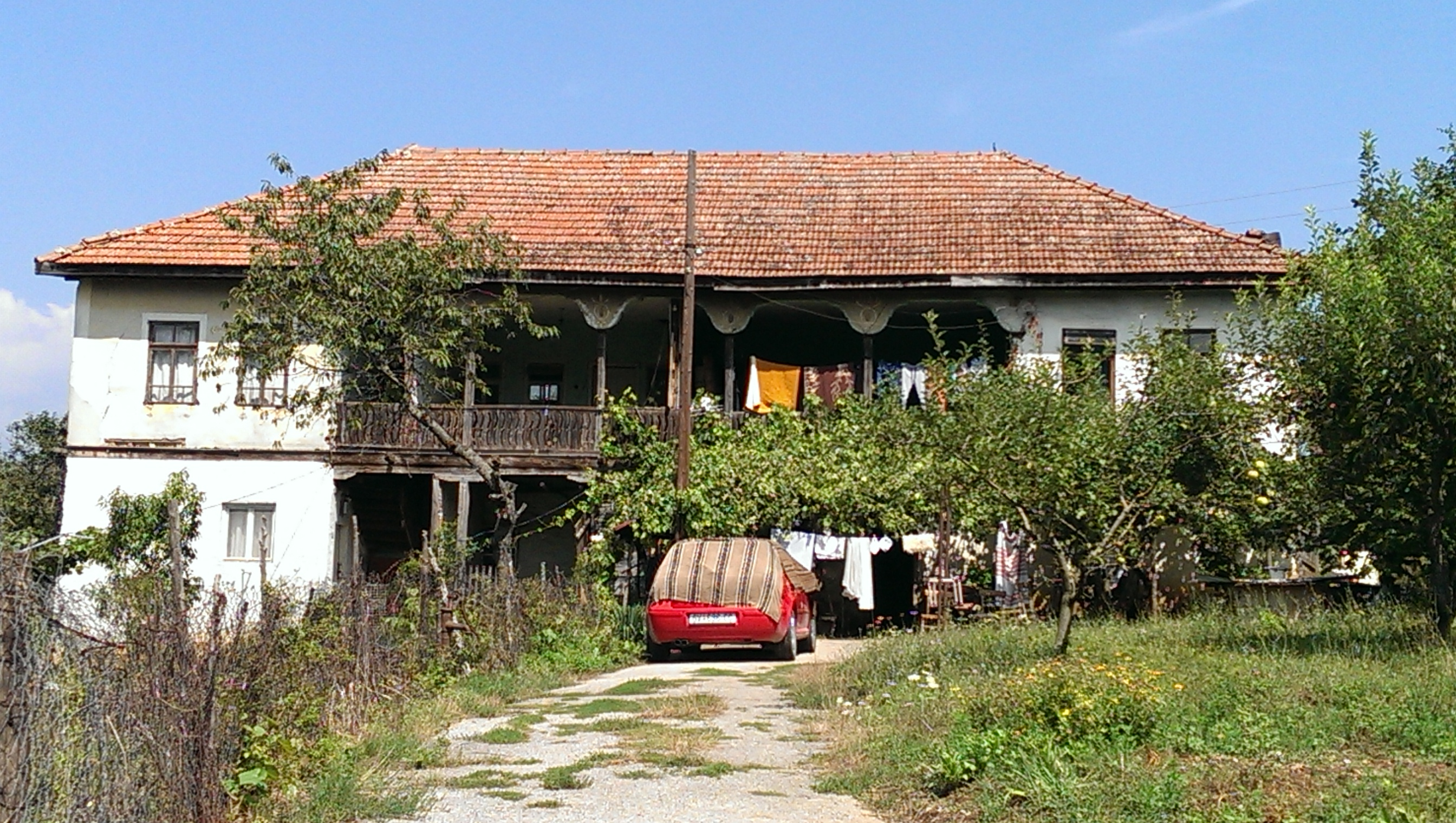
Architecture Volkovija 2.jpg

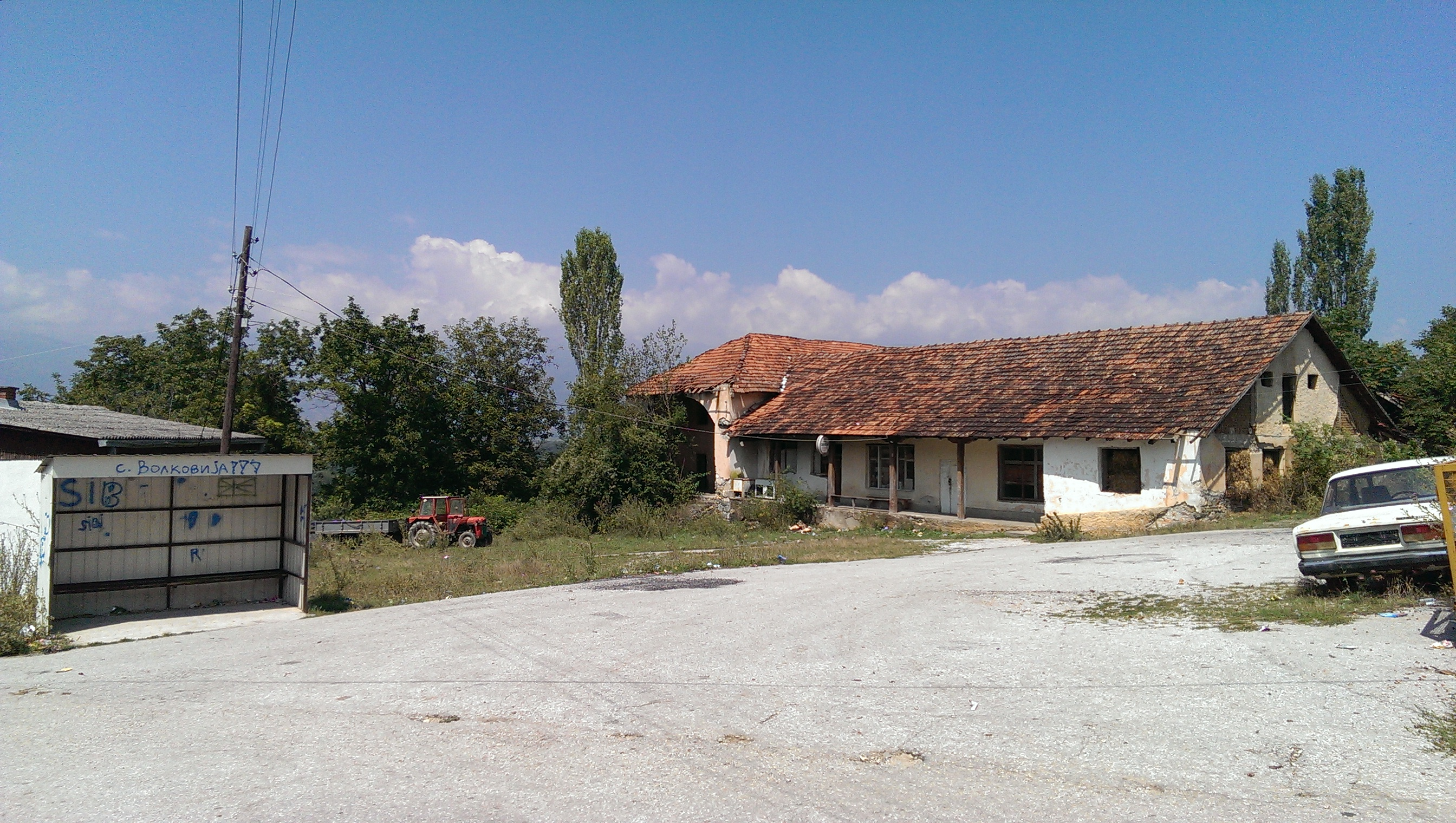
Bus stop central spot.jpg

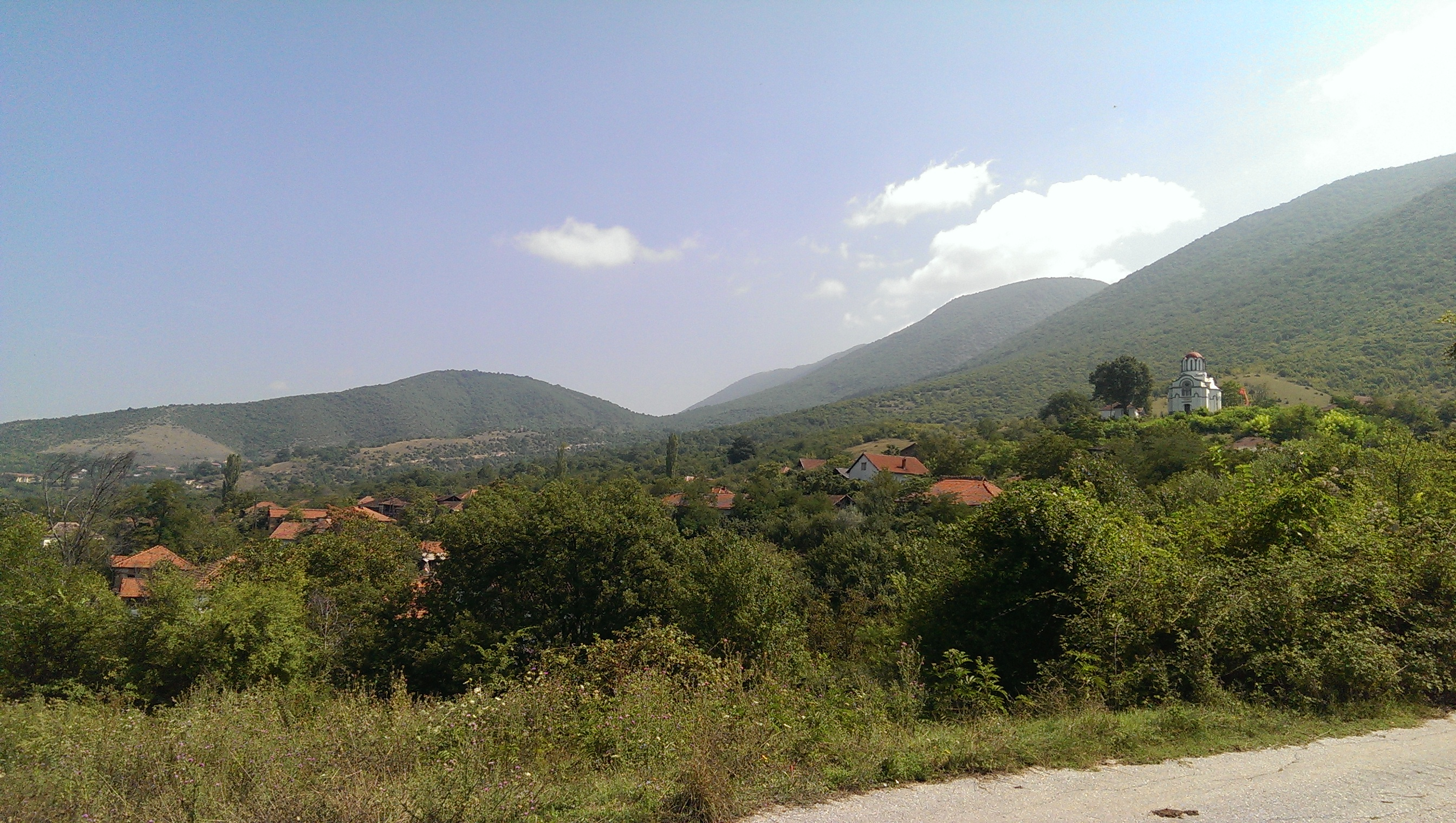
Ljuma.jpg

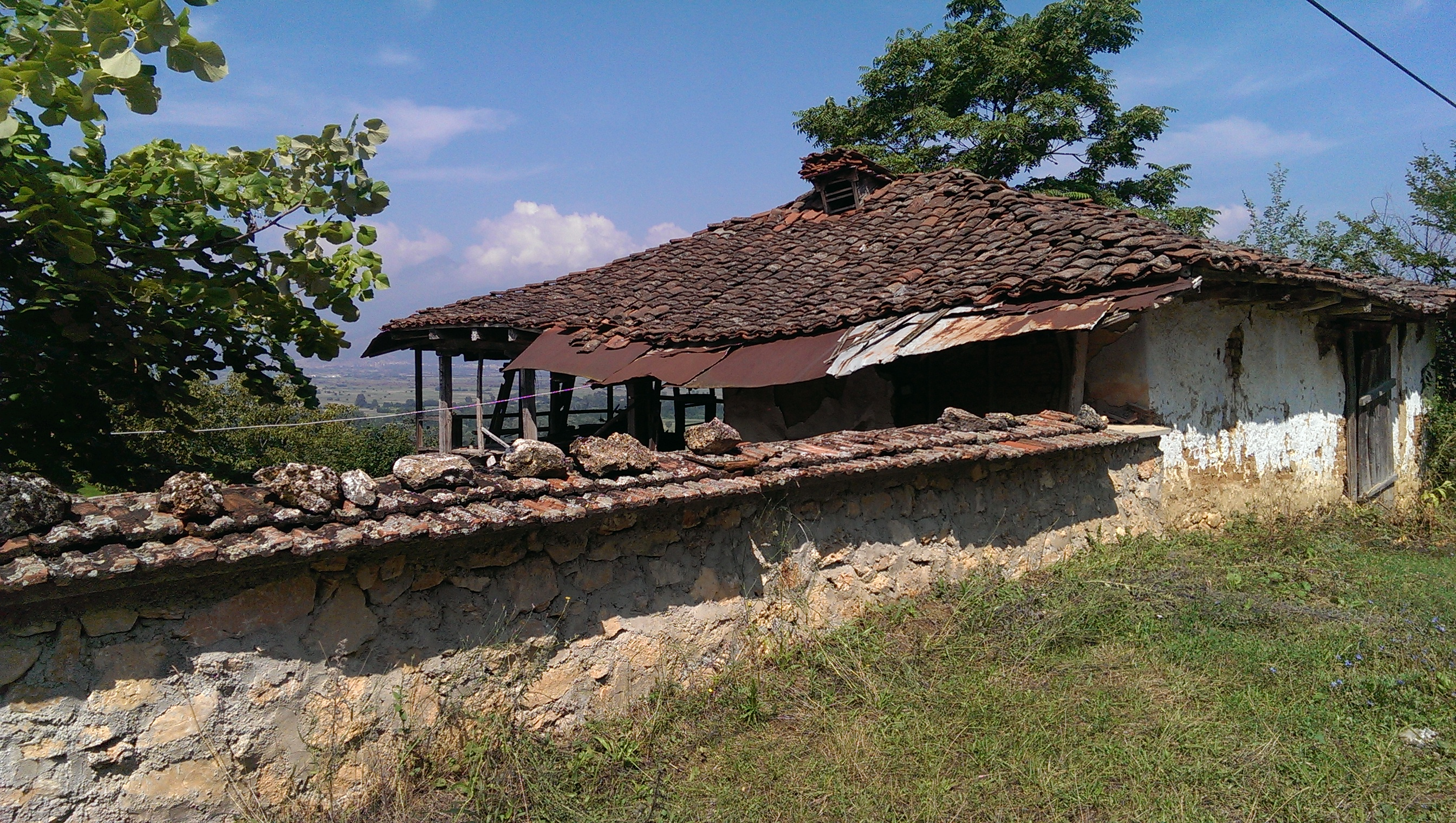
Ljuma2.jpg

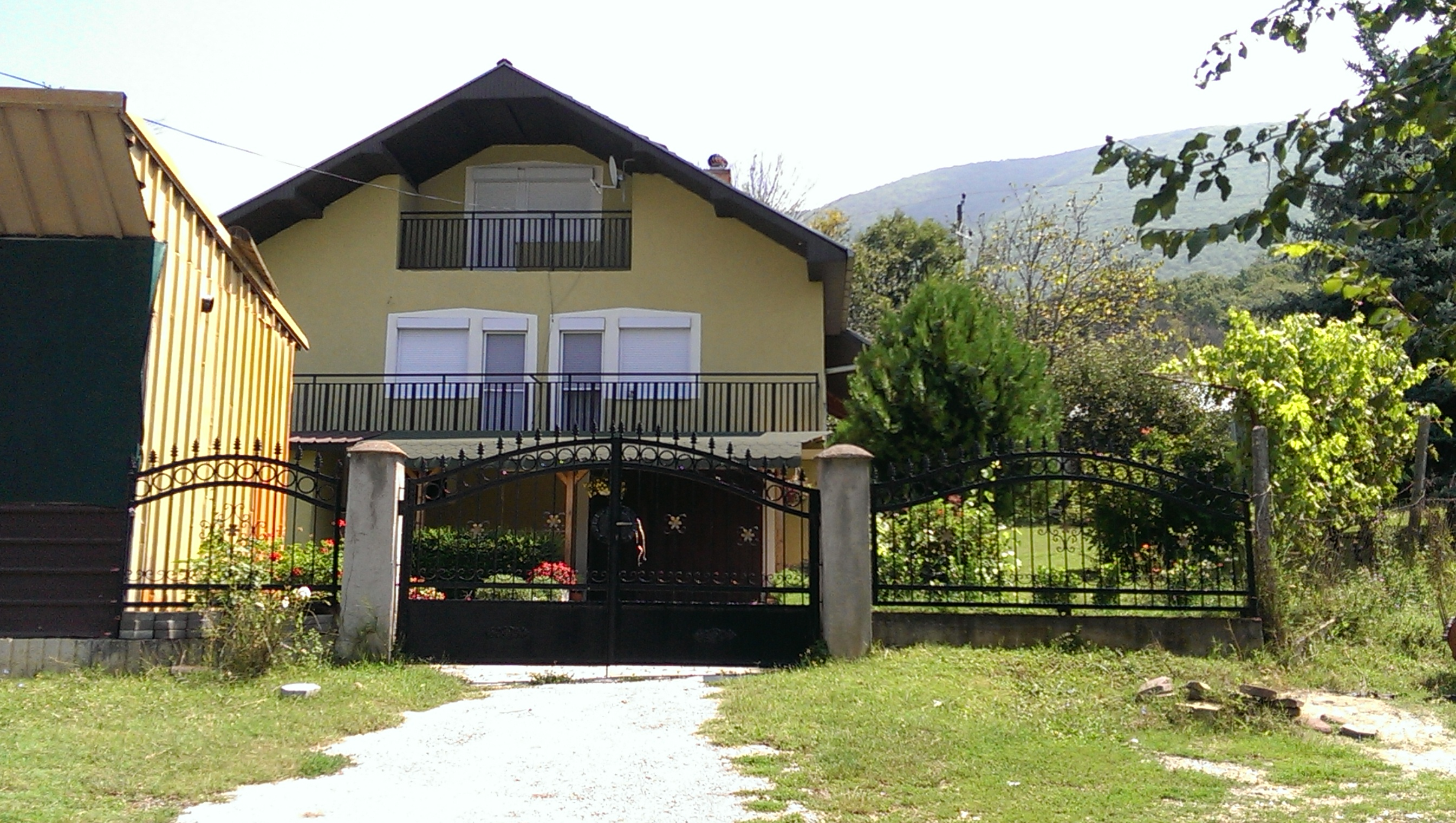
Local house Volkovija.jpg

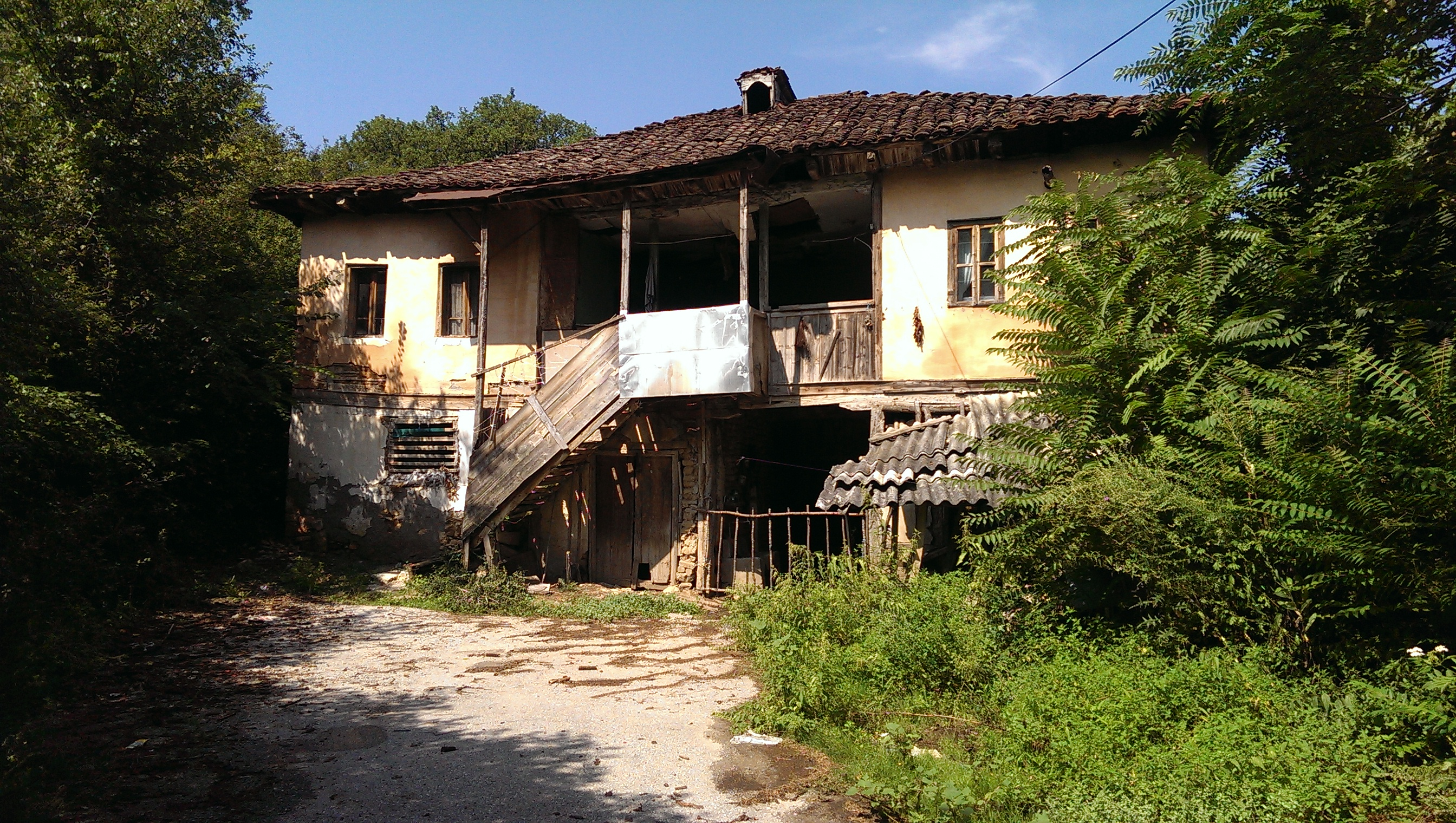
Old traditional house Volkovija.jpg

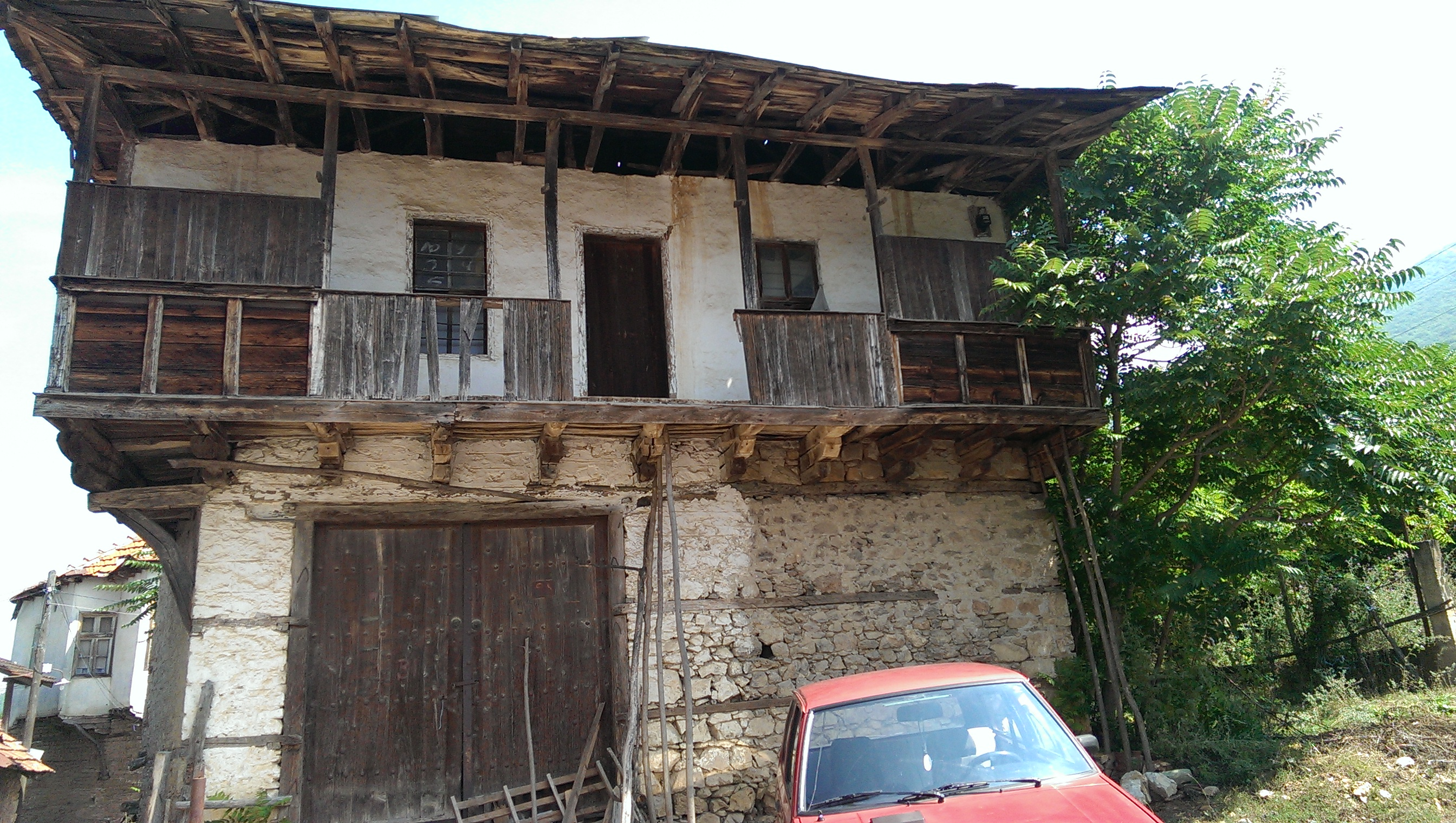
Old traditional house Volkovija 2.jpg

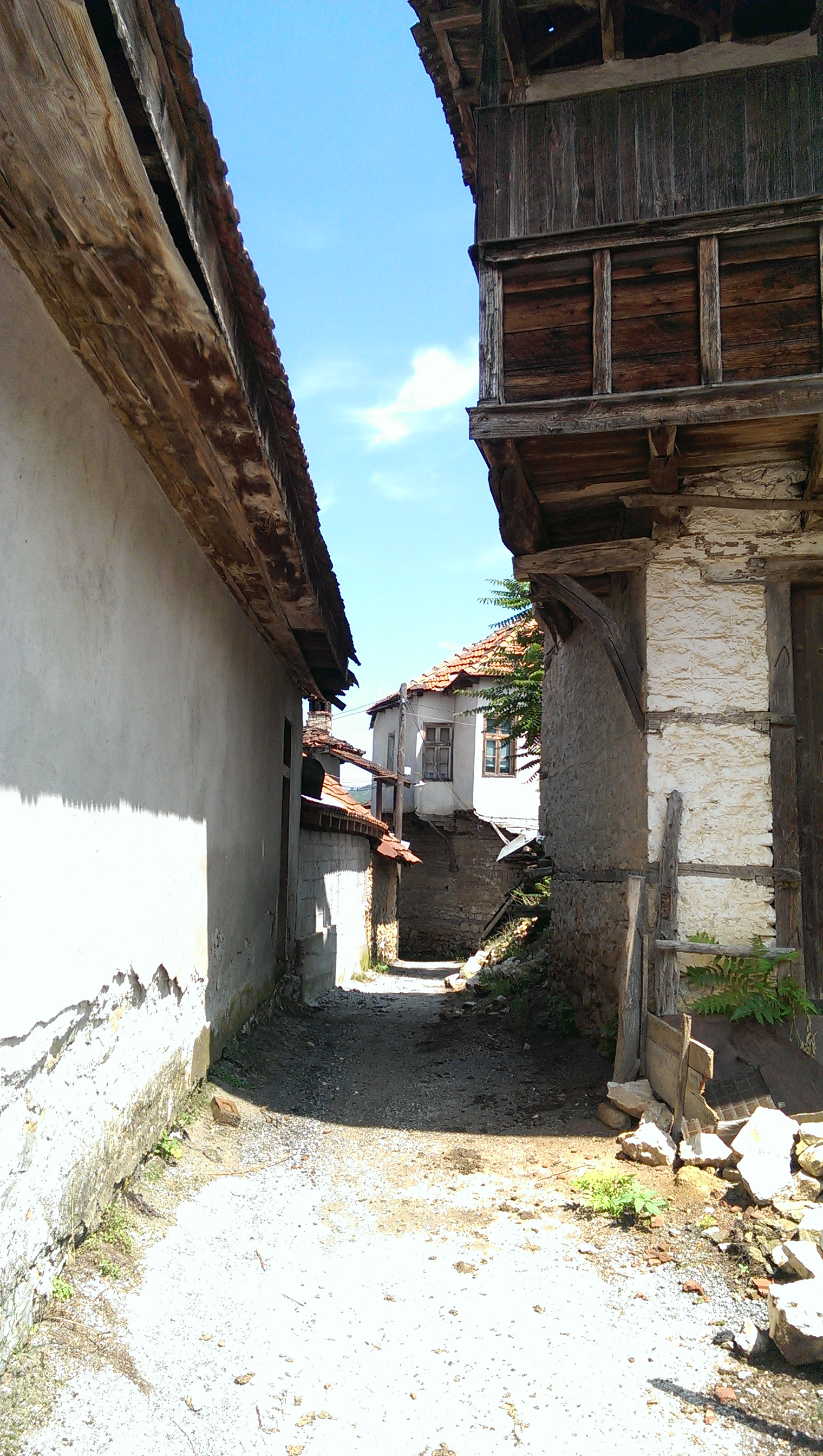
Small street Volkovija.jpg

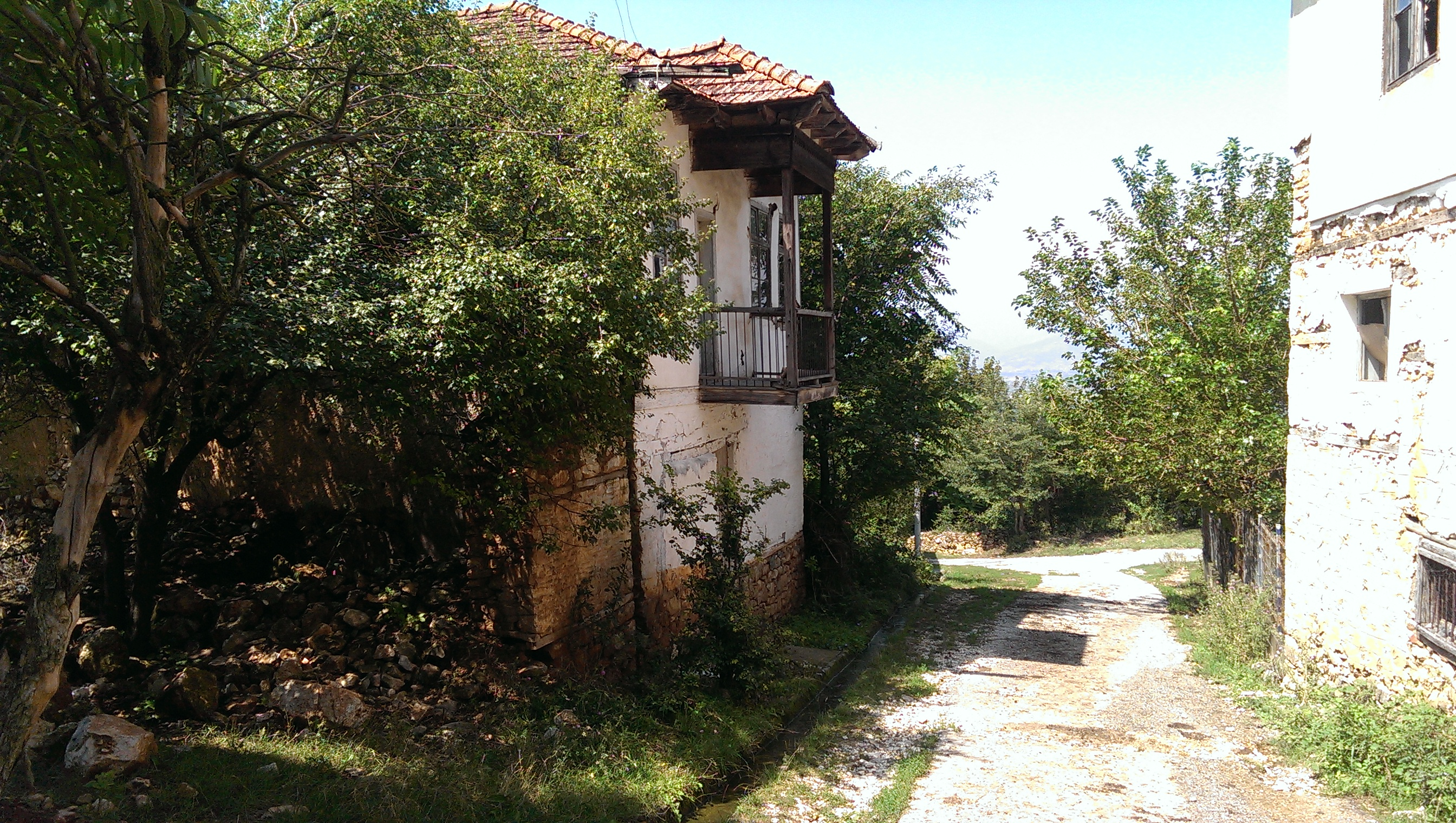
Street Volkovija.jpg

== Sources ==
"Профил на Општина Брвеница". Општина Брвеница (Municipality of Brvenica). Municipality of Brvenica.
