= Ministry of Health (North Macedonia) =

Government body in North Macedonia

Ministry of Health of the Republic of North Macedonia
Agency overview
- Formed: 1991
- Jurisdiction: Government of North Macedonia
- Employees: 108
- Annual budget: MKD 6,674 million (as of 2018)
- Minister responsible: Azir Aliu

The Ministry of Health is a government body of the Republic of North Macedonia responsible for managing the country’s public health system. It oversees health care services, health insurance, disease prevention, and environmental health. As of 2025, the Minister of Health is Azir Aliu, a member of the Alliance for Albanians party, is serving under the leadership of Prime Minister Hristijan Mickoski. The first Minister of Health of North Macedonia was Perko Kolevski.

== Responsibilities ==
According to the Law on the Organization and Operation of State Administration Bodies, the Ministry of Health is responsible for:

- Providing health care services and managing health insurance
- Developing and organizing the national health system
- Monitoring the health status of the population
- Protecting the population from:
  - Communicable diseases
  - Environmental hazards (e.g. radiation, noise, toxic gases, contaminated soil, polluted air and water)
  - Poisons and narcotics
- Managing hygiene and epidemiological conditions
- Ensuring the availability of medicines, medical equipment, and supplies
- Monitoring pollution in air, water, soil, and food
- Other duties defined by law
