= Krakornica =

Krakornica Кракорница Krakarnicë
- Village
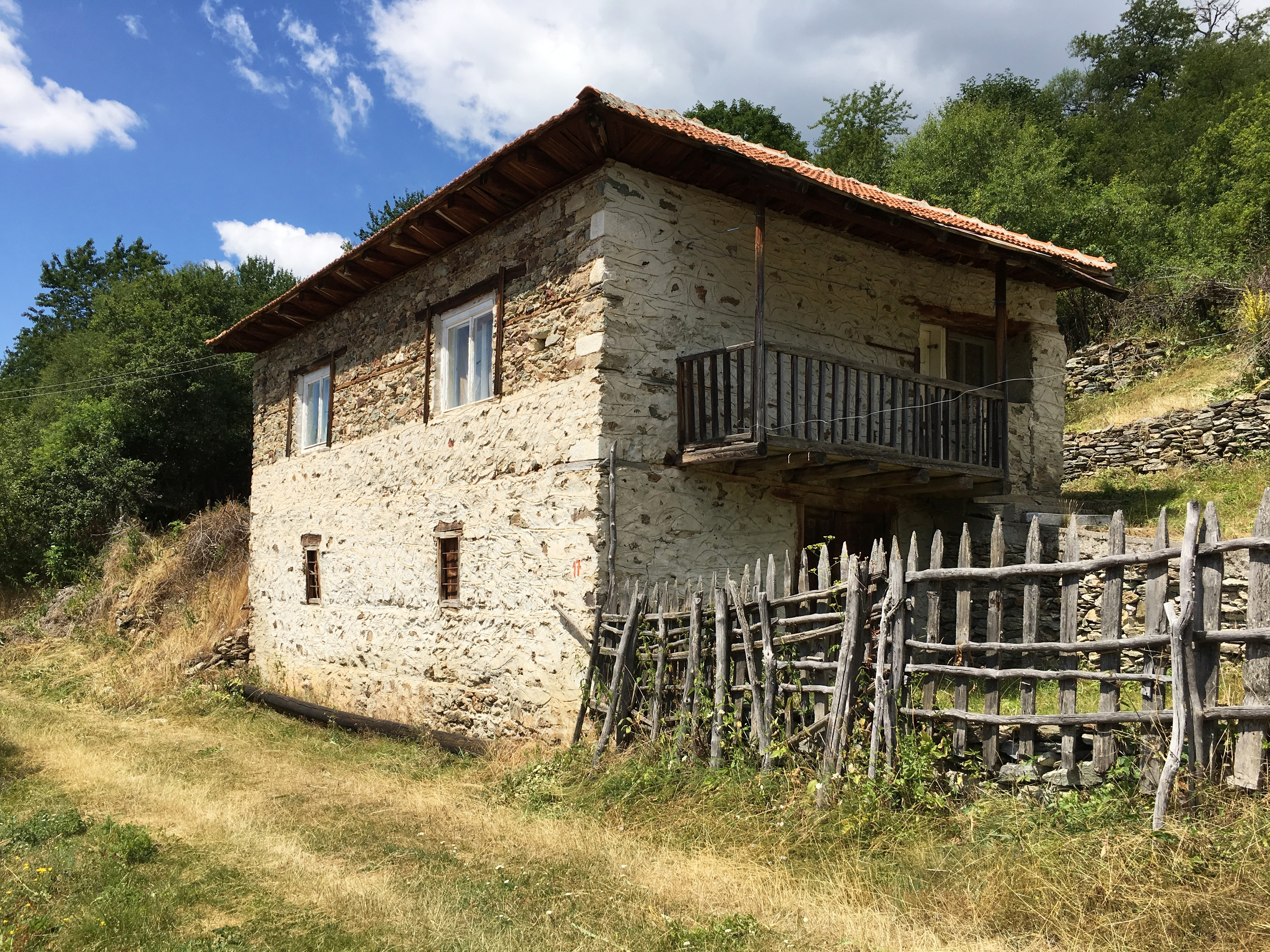
- Traditional old house in the village

- Location within North Macedonia
- Coordinates: 41°45′N 20°42′E
- Country: North Macedonia
- Region: Polog
- Municipality: Mavrovo and Rostuša

Population (2002)
  - Total: 15
- Time zone: UTC+1 (CET)
  - Summer (DST): UTC+2 (CEST)
- Car plates: GV
- Website: .

Krakornica (Macedonian: Кракорница, Albanian: Krakarnicë) is a village in the municipality of Mavrovo and Rostuša, North Macedonia.

== Geography ==
Krakornica is located between the Korab and Šar Mountains. It is located 31km from the town of Gostivar. At an altitude of 1530 m, it is considered the highest inhabited settlement in North Macedonia.

== History ==
Krakornica (Kurakornica) is recorded in the Ottoman defter of 1467 as a village in the ziamet of Reka. The settlement had a total of three households represented by household heads all bearing Albanian anthroponymy. In 1519, the village counted 12 Christian married families and 1 bachelor. In the 1583 census, the village of Kakornica counted 1 Muslim and 20 Christian families respectively, and 1 bachelor. One mill was working and the timar was paid 1113 akçe annually. The Christian anthroponyms recorded were Albanian and mixed Slavic-Albanian in character.: (e.g. Mahmut Abdulla, Pal Petko, Lin Janica, Laç Tode, Petri Stojan, Leko Miho, Gjon Miho, Lado Pejçin).

According to Ethnographie des Vilayets D'Andrinople, de Monastir, et de Salonique, published in Constantinople in 1878, the village had a total of 80, households with 83 Muslim Albanian and 120 Orthodox Albanian inhabitants. In statistics gathered by Vasil Kanchov in 1900, the village of Krakornica was inhabited by 180 Christian Albanians and 180 Muslim Albanians. In 1905 in statistics gathered by Dimitar Mishev Brancoff, Krakornica was inhabited by 210 Albanians and had a Bulgarian school. Christian Albanians were attracted by Serbian propaganda and according to the statistics of the newspaper " Debarski Glas " in 1911 there were 64 Albanian Patriarchist houses in Krakornica.

Due to the Balkan Wars, Muslim residents of Krakornica abandoned the village.

According to a 1929 ethnographic map by Russian Slavist Afanasy Selishchev, Krakornica was an Albanian village.

== Demographics ==
Krakornica's population in Yugoslav and Macedonian censuses has been ethnic Macedonian. According to the 2021 census, Krakornica had 1 resident.

Ethnic group	census 1953		census 1961		census 1971		census 1981		census 1991		census 1994		census 2002		census 2021	
Ethnic group	Number	%	Number	%	Number	%	Number	%	Number	%	Number	%	Number	%	Number	%
Macedonians	142	99.3	166	99.4	112	100.0	73	97.3	23	100.0	30	100.0	15	100.0	1	100.0
Serbs	1	0.7	0	0.0	0	0.0	0	0.0	0	0.0	0	0.0	0	0.0	0	0.0
Albanians	0	0.0	1	0.6	0	0.0	0	0.0	0	0.0	0	0.0	0	0.0	0	0.0
others	0	0.0	0	0.0	0	0.0	2	2.7	0	0.0	0	0.0	0	0.0	0	0.0
Total	143		167		112		75		23		30		15		1	

== Culture ==
In 2007 author Edibe Selimi-Osmani recorded a number of folk songs of the Upper Reka region. Among these the song Trandafil në ferrë (rose amongst the thorns) is recorded from the Krakornica native and Albanian speaker Grozda Nikolovska.
