= Rudi Gusnić =

Macedonian-Serbian footballer and manager

Personal information
- Full name: Rudi Gusnić; Pуди Гуcнић
- Date of birth: 5 August 1971 (age 55)
- Place of birth: Gostivar, SFR Yugoslavia
- Height: 1.73 m (5 ft 8 in)
- Position: Midfielder

Youth career
- Sloga Kraljevo

Senior career*
Years	Team	Apps	(Gls)
- Kolubara
1992–1995	Sloga Kraljevo		
1995–2002	Čukarički	160	(10)
2002	Legia Warsaw	1	(0)
2003	Čukarički	12	(0)
2004	Ribnica Mionica		

Managerial career
- Čukarički (assistant)
- 2007–: Čukarički (youth)
- * Club domestic league appearances and goals

Rudi Gusnić (Serbian Cyrillic: Руди Гуснић, Macedonian: Руди Гусниќ; born 5 August 1971) is a Macedonian-Serbian football manager and former player.

== Club career ==
Born in Gostivar, SR Macedonia, SFR Yugoslavia, he started his career at FK Sloga Kraljevo where he played in all youth levels. As a senior, he debuted playing with FK Kolubara from where he moved in 1995 to Belgrade to play with FK Čukarički where he spent most of his career becoming one of the most charismatic players of the club. In 2002, he had a six-month spell with Polish side Legia Warsaw from where he returned to Čukarički where he played till near the end of his career. During his time at Legia Warsaw, Gusnić was reunited with coach Dragan Okuka, who had previously managed him at Čukarički. His move to Poland came after attracting Okuka’s attention, and he made several appearances for the club before returning to Serbia. He finished his playing career playing with FK Ribnica Mionica during the second half of the 2003–04 season.

== Managerial career ==
After retiring, he stayed at Čukarički, becoming the assistant manager of several club coaches, and, afterwards, since 2007, working as the main youth coach.
