= Perko Kolevski =

Macedonian politician (1944–2021)

- Перко Колевски

Minister of Health
- In office 20 March 1991 – 5 September 1992
- Preceded by: Position established
- Succeeded by: Jovan Tofoski

Personal details
- Born: 27 December 1944 Buneš, Probištip, Macedonia, Yugoslavia
- Died: 17 December 2021 (aged 76)
- Occupation: Politician

Perko Gjorgjiev Kolevski (Macedonian: Перко Ѓорѓиев Колевски; 27 December 1944 – 17 December 2021) was a Macedonian doctor, professor, and politician. He was the first Minister of Health of North Macedonia, serving from 1991 to 1992.

== Biography ==
Kolevski was born on 27 December 1944 in Buneš. In 1977, he participated in the first kidney transplantations of North Macedonia.

In 1987, he was awarded the Order of Merit for the People with a Silver Star.

He was the director of the Institute for Transfusion Medicine at the Clinical Center in Skopje.

He served as Minister of Health of North Macedonia from 1991 to 1992, making him the first Minister of Health.

He is a recipient of the State Award "11 October" for his contributions to science and medicine.

After a brief illness, he died on 17 December 2021.
