= Atanas Albanski =

Atanas the Albanian (Bulgarian: Atanas Albanski; Albanian: Thanas Shqiptari; 1880 - 1943) was a Bulgarian revolutionary, voivode of the Internal Macedonian-Adrianople Revolutionary Organization and the Internal Macedonian Revolutionary Organization.

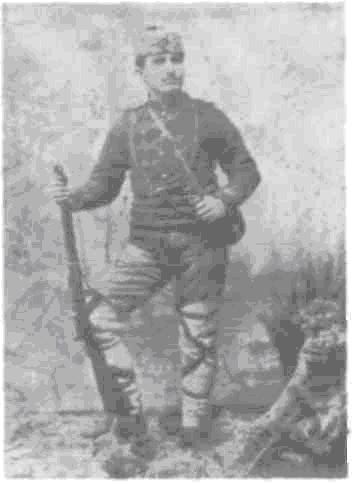
Atanas Albanski

== Biography ==
Albanski was born in 1880 in Gorno Jelovce into an Albanian Orthodox family. He graduated from the Skopje Exarchate Pedagogical School and became an Exarchate teacher in Skopje . He joined the VMORO , and was elected a member of the Skopje District Revolutionary Committee by the Organization. He participated in the Ilinden–Preobrazhenie Uprising as a commander of a company in the Tetovo and Gostivar regions. After the uprising, in 1904 he was elected secretary of the company of Duke Vancho Srbakov , and in 1907, he was secretary of the company of Ivan Naumov. After World War I , from 1928 to 1934, he was appointed plenipotentiary of the Central Committee of the Internal Macedonian Revolutionary Organization in Petrich. He died in Sofia, Bulgaria, in 1943.
