= Azir Aliu =

Macedonian politician (born 1976)

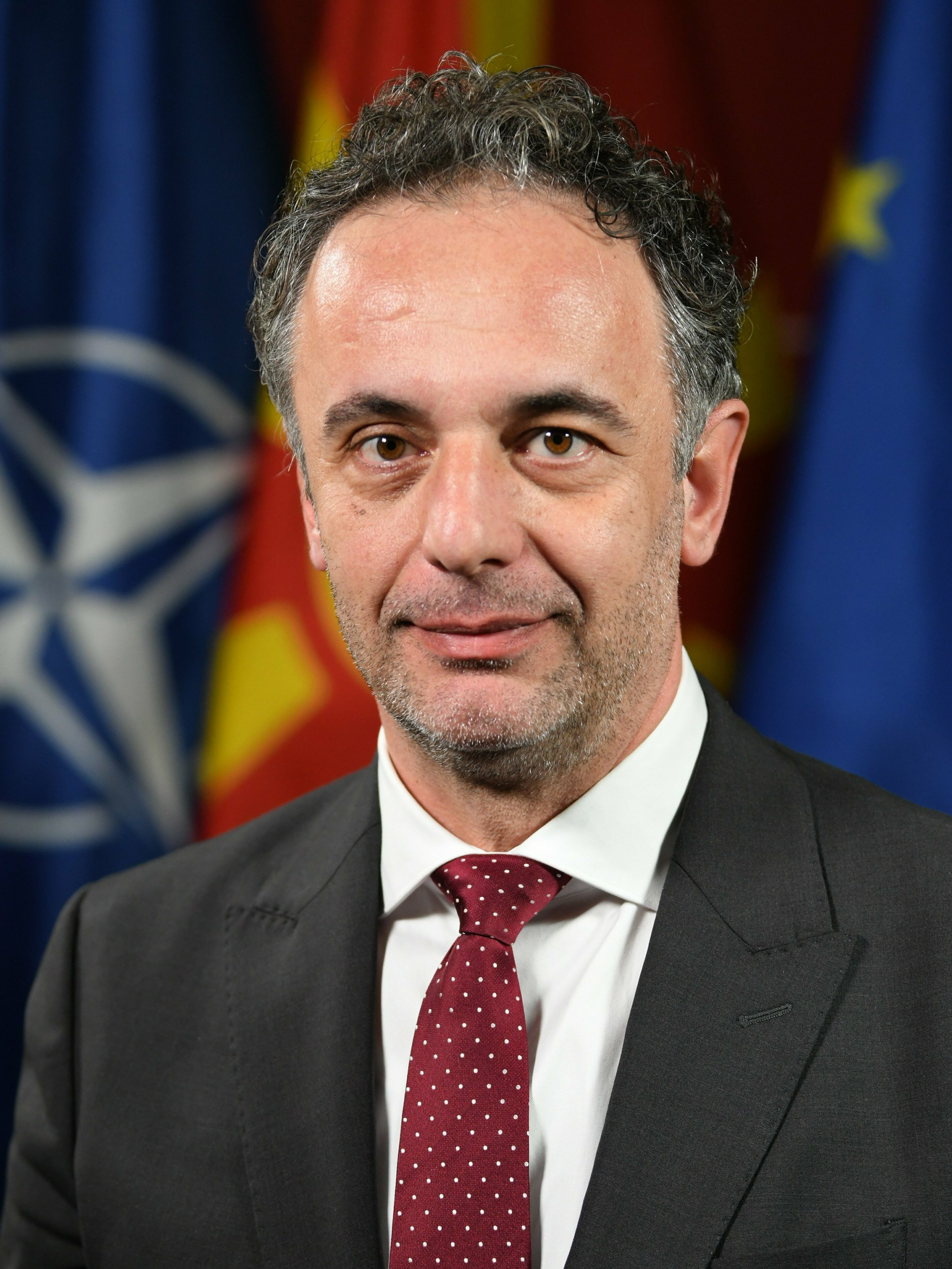

Minister of Health
- Incumbent
- Assumed office 9 June 2025
- President: Gordana Siljanovska-Davkova
- Prime Minister: Hristijan Mickovski
- Preceded by: Arben Taravari

Minister of Public Administration
- In office 28 February 2023 – 9 February 2024
- President: Stevo Pendarovski
- Prime Minister: Dimitar Kovačevski; Talat Xhaferi (technically)
- Preceded by: Admirim Aliti
- Succeeded by: Naim Bajrami

Personal details
- Born: 15 April 1976 (age 50) Gostivar, SR Macedonia, Yugoslavia
- Party: Alliance for Albanians
- Profession: Professor, electrical engineer, informatics

Azir Aliu (born 15 April, 1976 in Gostivar) is a Macedonian professor of science and technology, specializing in cryptography, cybersecurity, blockchain technology and machine learning. As of 9 June, 2025, he is serving as Minister of Health of North Macedonia, being part of VLEN, and has previously served as Minister of Public Administration from 2023 to 2024.

== Early life ==
Azir Aliu was born on 15 April 1976 in Gostivar, then part of Yugoslavia. He completed his undergraduate and master's degrees in electrical engineering at the Ss. Cyril and Methodius University of Skopje. He later earned a Ph.D. in Information Sciences from the Faculty of Natural Sciences and Mathematics at the same university.

Aliu began his professional career as a teacher at the Panče Popovski Gymnasium in Gostivar (2003–2004), before moving into higher education as a junior assistant at the University of Southeast Europe (USEE) in Tetovo.

In the early years of his academic career, he began his first steps as a junior assistant at the University of Southeast Europe, having previously worked as a teacher at the Panče Popovski Gymnasium in Gostivar in 2003/2004.

== Career ==
Aliu spent the majority of his academic career at the University of Southeast Europe. From 2004 to 2007, he served as a junior assistant, later advancing to assistant (2007–2012), and then Assistant Professor in 2012. He was promoted to Associate Professor in 2017 and Full Professor in 2022, a position he holds to date.

From 2012 to 2014, he was Vice Dean for Science at the Faculty of Computer Science and Technology. Between 2018 and 2020, he served as Vice President of the University's Board of Trustees.

In addition to his academic work, Aliu was a member of the National Committee for Entrepreneurship and Innovation (2013–2017) and served as an advisor on higher education to the Prime Minister of North Macedonia during that period.
