= House of Kuze Frčkovski =

- Куќа на Кузе Фрчковски; Kukja na Kuze Frčkovski (Macedonian)
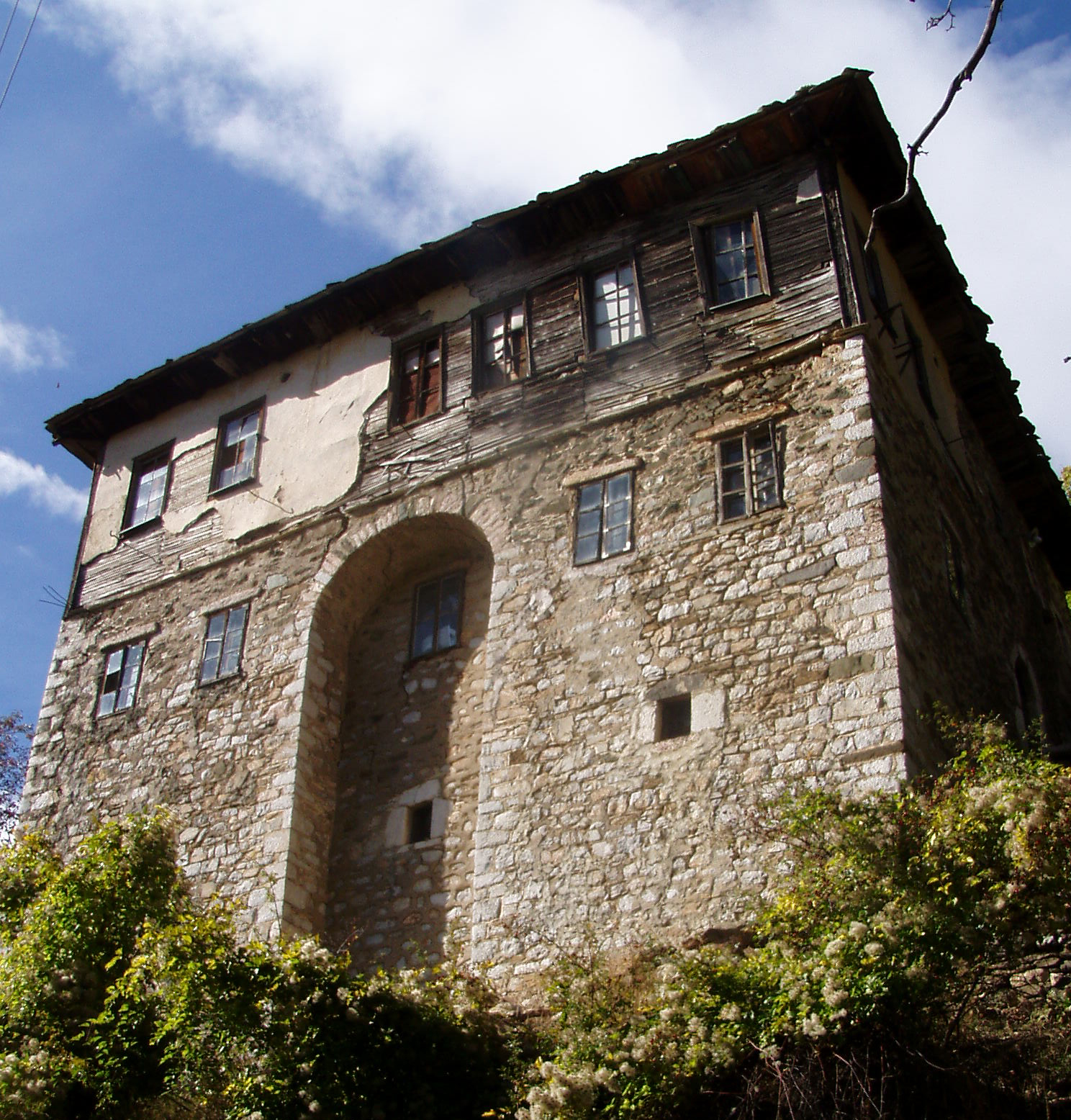
- Interactive map of House of Kuze Frčkovski
- 41°35′28.41″N 20°38′53.98″E
- Type: House
- Location: Galičnik, North Macedonia

Site notes
- Governing body: Office for Protection of Cultural Heritage, Ministry of Culture
- Owner: Frčkovski family

The House of Kuze Frčkovski is a historical house in Galičnik that is listed as Cultural heritage of North Macedonia. It is in ownership of one branch of the family of Frčkovski.

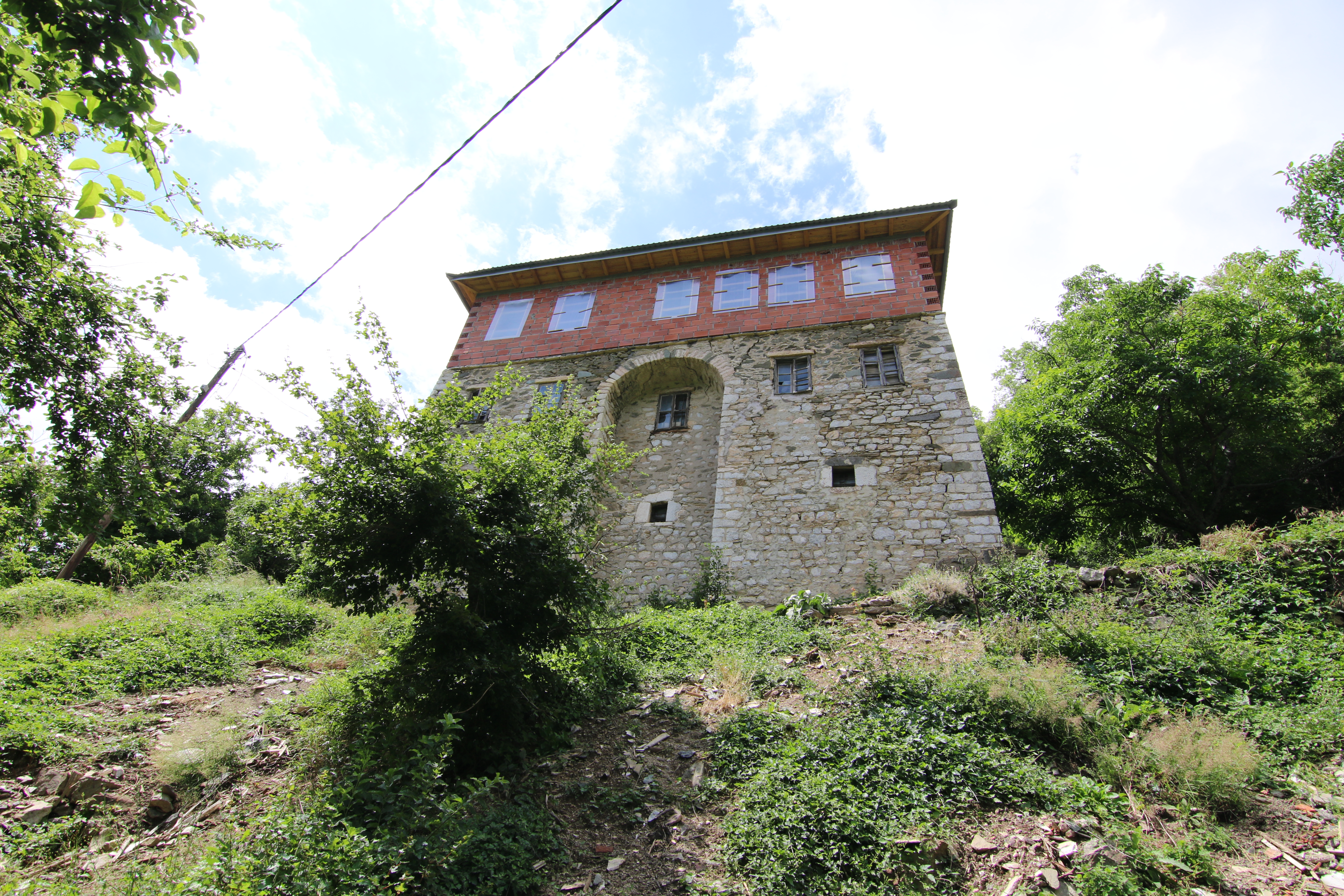
The house in restoration process in 2021.

== Family history ==
The original family name of Frčkovski family was Blaževski/Blaževci. Their surname was changed because, after the family started doing fresco painting and woodcutting as occupation in 1770s/1780s, the main tool frča (meaning brush). They were part of Miyak school of doing fresco painting and woodcutting.

=== Notable members of the family ===
- Negrija Blažev - the first known fresco painter and woodcutter.
- Makarija 'Makre' Blažev - son of Negrija and fresco painter who flourished in the first half of 19th century. He was member of Petar Petrovikj Garkata's tajfa - a company/band of fresco painters and woodcutters. Alongside with Garkata, he made the iconostasis at the Church of the Ascension of Jesus, located in Skopje, in 1824. about 10 years later, he worked in the churches of Saint Jovan Bigorski Monastery. He worked in many estates of begs in Macedonia and in Prizren. It is known that he made the furniture in the saray (estate) of Amzi Pasha, Bardovci. He also worked in Plovdiv. He died in Pazardzhik in 1849.
- Kuzman Blažev - son of Makarija and fresco painter-woodcutter. He worked in Dobruja, such as the towns of Kavarna, Shabla, Balchik, Varna. His tajfa came back in Macedonia and made the episcopal chair at the St. Gabriel of Lesnovo Monastery. Afterwards, they workerd in Kočani, Sveti Nikole, Ohrid, Struga, Kratovo. He was assigned work at the St. Mary the Virgin in Debar. He and the tajfa finished the episcopal chair and the ceremonial door at the Cathedral Church of St. Nickolas in Prizren. Again, he went to Bulgaria to work in Balchik, and South Dobruja in general, working in the local churches. He signed himself as Kumazan Makariev Blažev. He died in Varna in 1899.
- Danail Blažev - son of Nestor (Makarija's grandson). Alongside with his father, he worked in Bulgaria 1895. Then he worked by himself, with his tajfa, in Vidin, Lom, Pleven, Ruse, Silistra, Shumen, Varna, Tarnovo, Gabrovo, Troyan, Antimonovo, Gigen, Brest and Kula. Afterwards he moved to Serbia. He returned in Galičnik in 1912. In Macedonia, he worked in the villages of Miletino, Galate, Vrapčište, Tumčevište, Banjica, Gorno Jelovce, Gjurčane, Volkovija, Sarakinci. In the town of Tetovo, he worked in Sts. Cyril and Methodius Church and the chapel of the Tetovo cemetery. In Tetovo and Gostivar areas, he covered 36 objects. The worked in Skopje in a Čair neighbourhood church and the brand new Gostivar church.
- Apostol Blažev/Frčkoski - mayor of Galičnik, iconographer, helper during the Ilinden Uprising. As icon painter and iconographer, he worked in Bulgaria in many churches and monasteries. He has made a panoramic painting of Galičnik.
- Gjurčin Blažev/Frčkoski - iconographer and woodcutter. Most of his work was in Kalofer.
- Icače Frčkoski - iconographer and fresco painter. He worked in Petrich, wider Štip region, Ovče Pole Region, Vinica, Kočani.
- Jakov Frčkoski (1882-1952) - fresco painter. He worked in Bulgaria, Serbia, Macedonia.
- Josif Frčkoski - iconographer. He worked in Wallachia.
