= House of Velimir Gjinovski =

- Куќа на Велимир Ѓиновски; Kukja na Velimir Gjinovski (Macedonian)
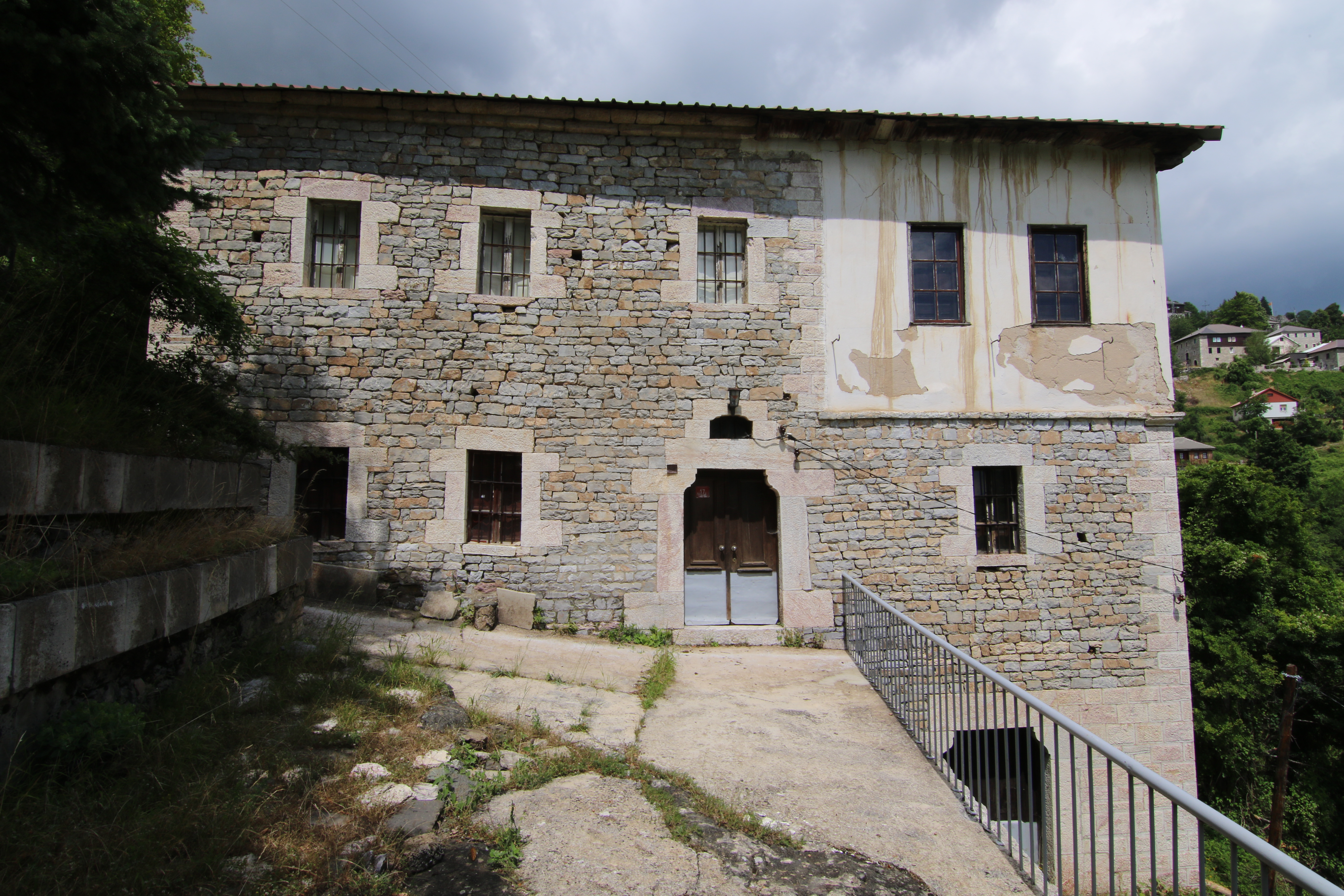
- Interactive map of House of Velimir Gjinovski
- 41°35′33.69″N 20°39′00.19″E
- Type: House
- Location: Galičnik, North Macedonia

Site notes
- Governing body: Office for Protection of Cultural Heritage, Ministry of Culture
- Owner: Gjinovski family

The House of Velimir Gjinovski is a historical house in Galičnik that is listed as Cultural heritage of North Macedonia. It is in ownership of one branch of the family of Gjinovski.

== Family history ==
The family of Gjinovski has shared ancestry with the families of Tomovski, Markovski and Ugrinovski.

Gjinovski family came from the village of Mogorče. They inhabited Galičnik together with the families of Tomovci and Ugrinovski.

=== Notable members of the family ===
- Gjino - progenitor of the family
- Trpko Gjinovski - son of Gjino He was rich sheep owner (kjeaja). He stood up against some infamous bandit called Kaljosh.
- Petre Gjinovski - son Trpko. He owned about 10,000 sheep and a lot of horses and workers.
- Krste Gjinoski - son of Petre and teacher (daskal) in the late 19th century. He taught in Galičnik, Debar, Tetovo, the villages of Gorna Reka, Vrben, Krakornica, and also in Bigorski Monastery. He was photographer.
- Panajot "Pane" Krstev Gjinoski (1841/8-1886) - son of Krste and teacher (daskal). He created a detailed genealogy tree of the Galičnik families. This work and many others got lost, either in the town of Vranje where Gjinoski family lived in the 1880s, or in Podgorica, after his death. Part of his works were published, upon request of the Russian historian, Slavist, ethnologist and geographer Pavel Rovinsky, in the magazine "Живая старина" (Zhivaya starina, lit. Living Antiquity) in 1899 by the title "Сборник Панаиота Гиновского из села Галичника" (Sbornik Panaiota Ginovskogo iz sela Galičnika; lit. Collection by Panajot Ginovski from village of Galičnik). He did not marry and did not have kids. He had a crippled leg. Due to harassments by some Albanian bandits, he and his family moved to Vranje. He died in Vranje on August 6, 1886, from measles.
- Aleksandar "Aleksa" Gjinovski - son of Krste (1851-1894). He was interested in woodcutting and he mastered it. He followed his father's footsteps and became a photographer and he owned a photo studio in Vranje. He made a number of photos of Galičnik, and other places in Macedonia such as Skopje, Ohrid, Thessalonica, Bitola, Kališta, Serres, and also in Serbia. He also photographed the Bigorski Monastery. In 1872, he and his brothers moved for good to Podgorica. He died in 1984 at the age of 43.
- Dragiša Gjinoski - son of Aleksa. He worked as an official in Podgorička banka.
- Milan Gjinoski - son of Velimir (Panajot's nephew). He worked as an official in the Ministry of Education.
- Ljubomir - son of Vasilko (Panajot's brother). He was head executive of Adriatic-Danubian Bank, based in Ljubljana.
- Dragan Gjinoski - WWII partisan in the Peoples liberation war of Macedonia.
- Velimir Gjinoski - WWII partisan in the Peoples liberation war of Macedonia.
- Ante Gjinoski - WWII partisan in the Peoples liberation war of Macedonia who died in the war.
- Krste Gjinoski - WWII partisan in the Peoples liberation war of Macedonia who died in the war.
- Trpko Pangovski - member and local activist of the League of Communist Youth of Yugoslavia.
