= House of Mitre Gjozinski and Velimir Čangovski =

- Куќа на Митре Ѓозински и Велимир Чанговски; Kukja na Mitre Gjozinski and Velimir Čangovski (Macedonian)
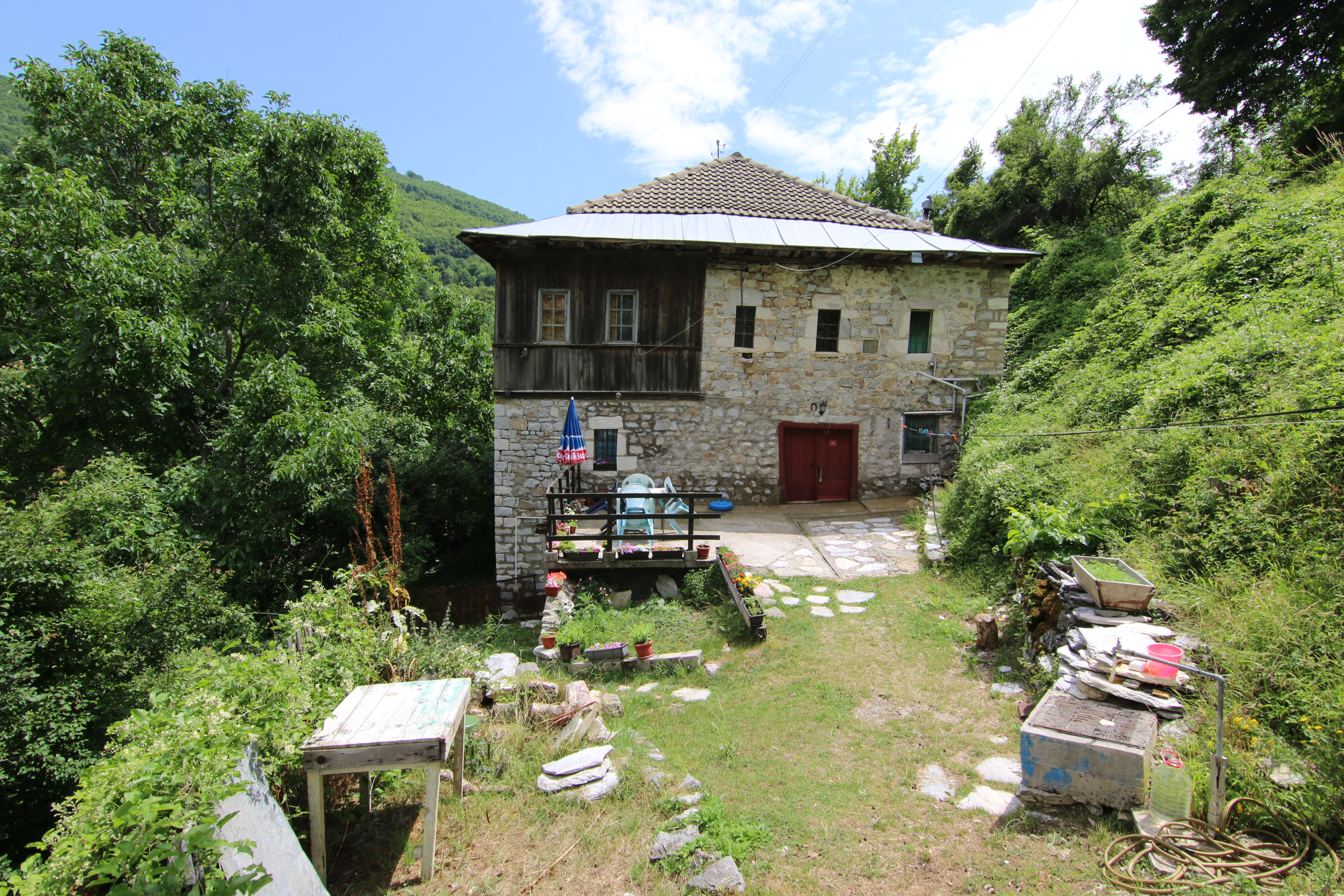
- Interactive map of House of Mitre Gjozinski and Velimir Čangovski
- 41°35′31.016″N 20°39′00.58″E
- Type: House
- Location: Galičnik, North Macedonia

Site notes
- Governing body: Office for Protection of Cultural Heritage, Ministry of Culture
- Owner: Gjozinski and Čangovski families

The House of Mitre Gjozinski and Velimir Čangovski, is a historical house in Galičnik that is listed as Cultural heritage of North Macedonia. It is in ownership of the families of Gjozinski and Čangovski.

== Family history ==
=== Members of the families ===
- Boris Gjozinski - member of the Communist Party of Yugoslavia
