= House of Tofe Keckarovski =

- Куќа на Тофе Кецкаровски; Kukja na Tofe Keckarovski (Macedonian)
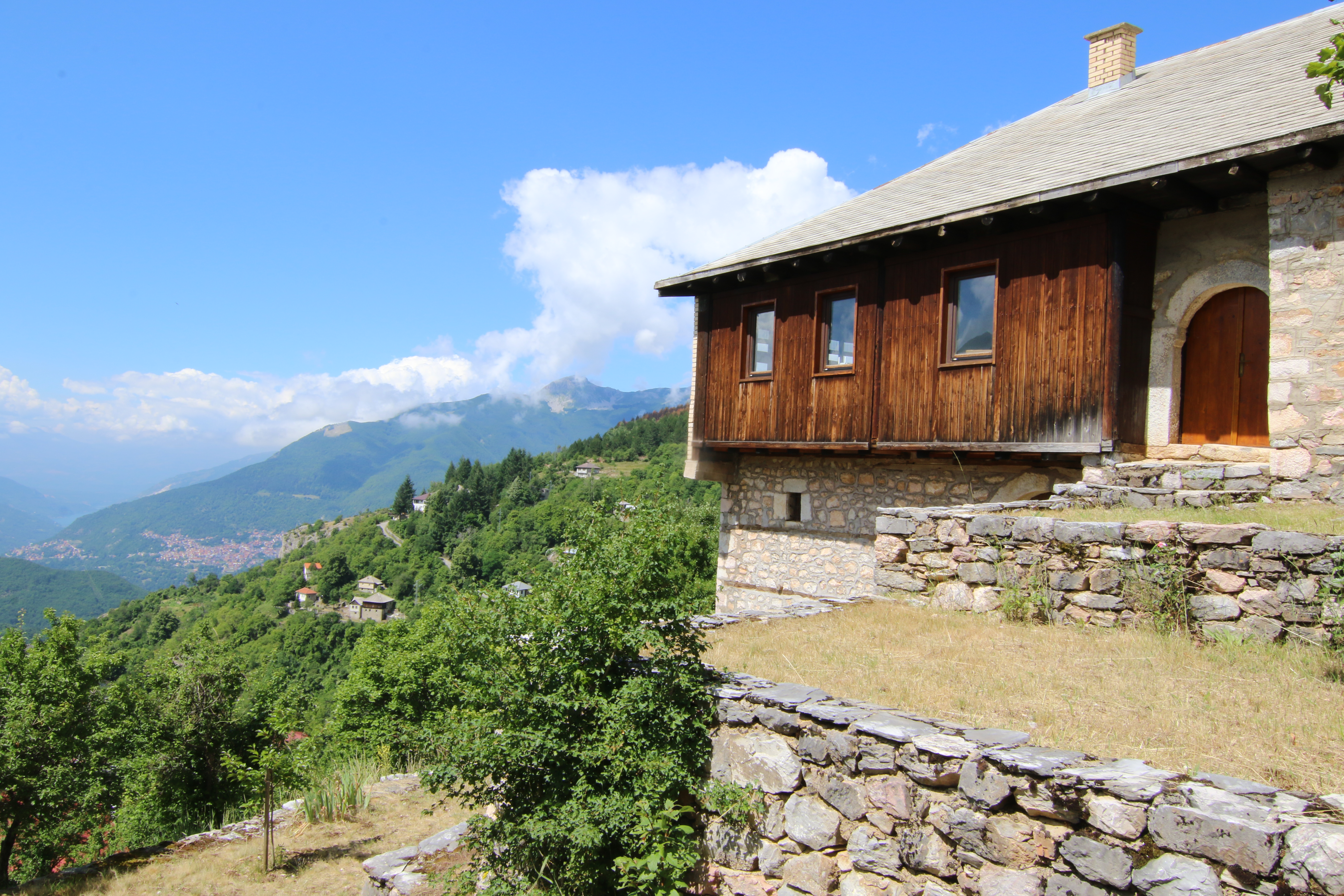
- Interactive map of House of Tofe Keckarovski
- 41°35′40.99″N 20°39′11.92″E
- Type: House
- Location: Galičnik, North Macedonia

Site notes
- Governing body: Office for Protection of Cultural Heritage, Ministry of Culture
- Owner: Keckarovski family

The House of Tofe Keckarovski is a historical house in Galičnik that is listed as Cultural heritage of North Macedonia. It is in ownership of one branch of the family of Keckarovski.

== History of the family ==
=== Notable members of the family ===
- Risto Keckarovski - member and local activist of the League of Communist Youth of Yugoslavia and the Communist Party of Yugoslavia. He was a secretary of one LCYY group.
- Elena Brezoska-Keckaroska ― member and local activist of the League of Communist Youth of Yugoslavia.
- Tofe Keckarovski ― partisan during the World War II in Yugoslav Macedonia.
- Lazar Keckarovski ― local activist in the mid 20th century.

== See also ==
- House of Boris and Tomo Bundalevski
- House of Ruse Gegovski
- House of Iljo Pangovski
- Galičnik Wedding Festival
