= Residence of Petre Lukanovski =

House in Galičnik, North Macedonia

House of Petre Lukanovski
- Куќа на Петре Лукановски; Kukja na Petre Lukanovski (Macedonian)
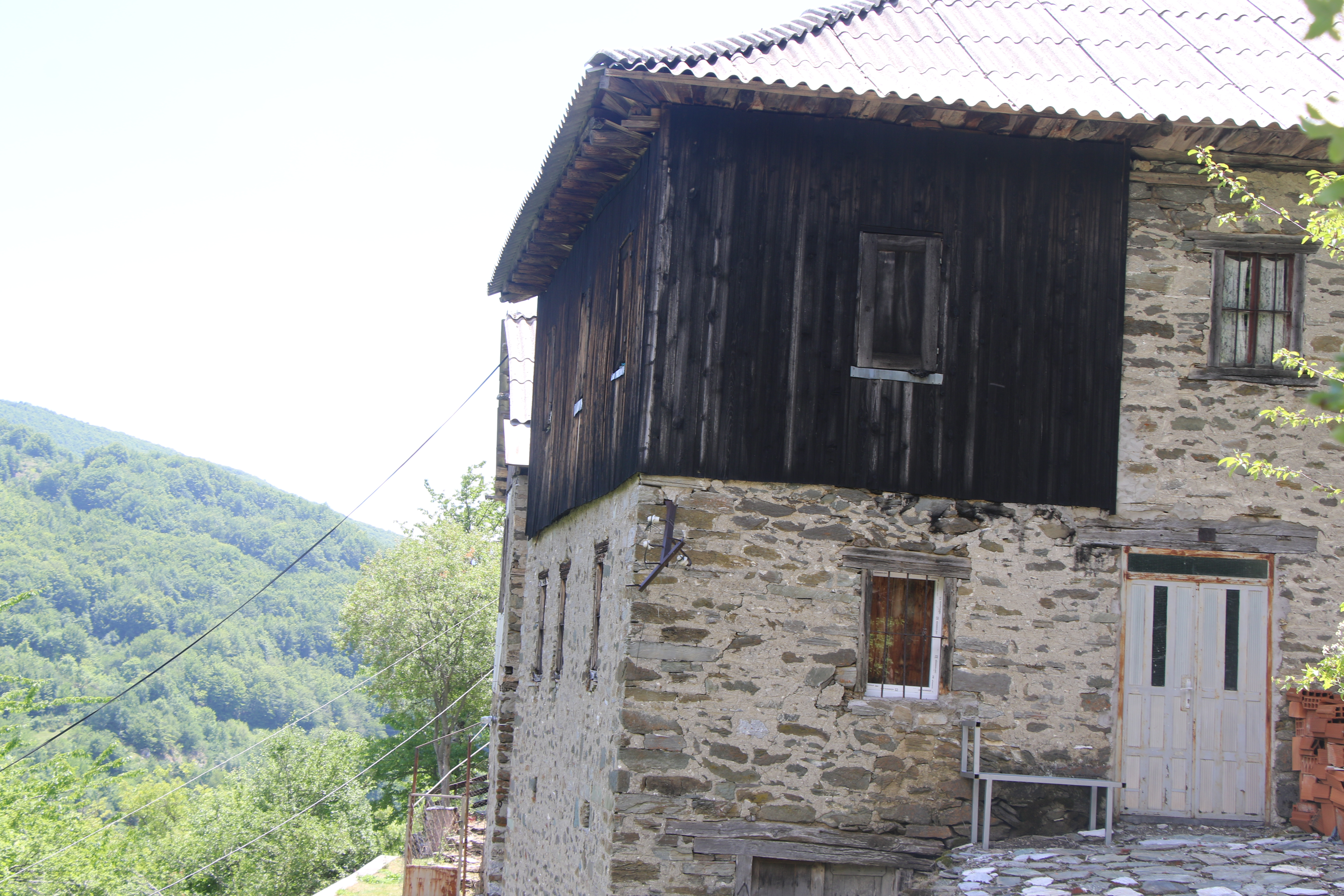
- Interactive map of House of Petre Lukanovski
- 41°35′32.92″N 20°38′56.62″E
- Type: House
- Location: Galičnik, North Macedonia

History
- Built: 1912; 114 years ago

Site notes
- Architect: Jordan Filiposki
- Governing body: Office for Protection of Cultural Heritage, Ministry of Culture
- Owner: Lukanovski family

The House of Despot Lukanovski, officially listed by OPCH as House of Petre Lukanovski, is a historical house in Galičnik that is listed as Cultural heritage of North Macedonia. It is in ownership of the family of Lukanovski.

== History and characteristics of the house ==
The house was built in 1912. The house was designed and supervised by Jordan Filiposki (father of Niko and Slavko Filiposki) and in the same year, construction of three identical houses began, of which one was the Lukanoski house, the second was the Filiposki house, and a third house which is not identified. In 1914, the construction of the house was completed, where the family of the married couple Despot and Kala Lukanoski lived.

The house is on two floors, i.e. three, starts with a porch that stretches along half of square footage of the house, and is located at the bottom with a separate front door which is in good condition. On the ground floor from the entrance there is a hallway (gjizentija) along the entire space, from on the left side there are two rooms with size 4 × 5 m^{2}, on the right side there are 2 wells with size 4 × 5 m^{2}. There are internal wooden stairs that connect the second floor and parallel to the longer side of the house there is hallway, on the left side there is a room with size 4 × 5 m^{2}, guest room with size 8 × 4 m^{2}, on the right side there is a room with size 5 x5 m2, kitchen (fireplace) with size 5 × 5 m^{2}. It was covered with stone slabs, which were replaced in 1990 by Vase Lukanoski. From the first floor in the continuation of the gjizentija where the stairs start, there was a closed small one a bridge with a door that served to connect the smaller house which now stands as a separate building.

== See also ==
- Residence of Jose Plačkovski
- Residence of Gjorgji Čalčevski
- Galičnik Wedding Festival
