= House of Jovan Muratovski =

- Куќа на Никола Куковски; Kukja na Jovan Muratovski (Macedonian)
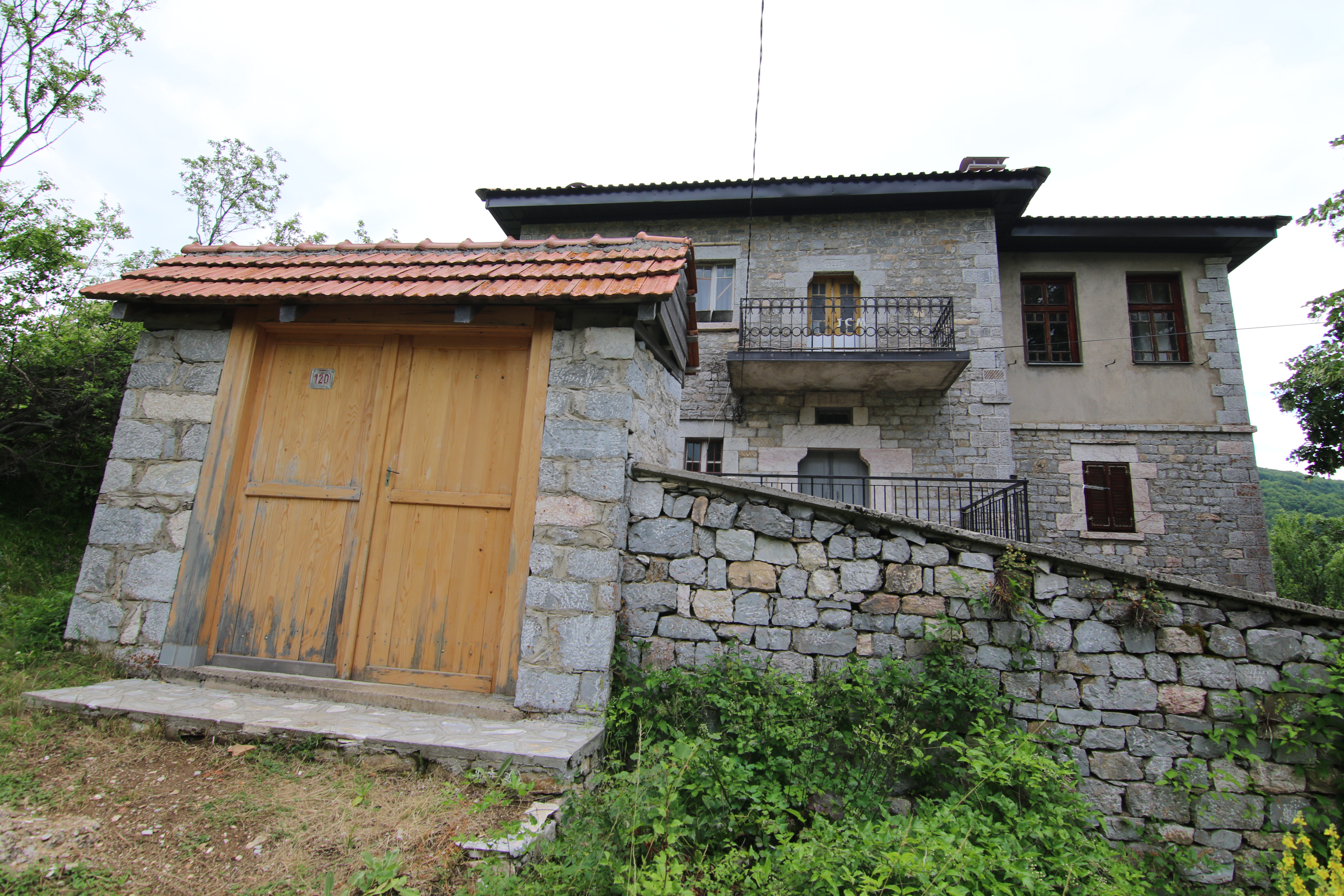
- Interactive map of House of Jovan Muratovski
- 41°35′34.95″N 20°39′16.6″E
- Type: House
- Location: Galičnik, North Macedonia

Site notes
- Governing body: Office for Protection of Cultural Heritage, Ministry of Culture
- Owner: Muratovski family

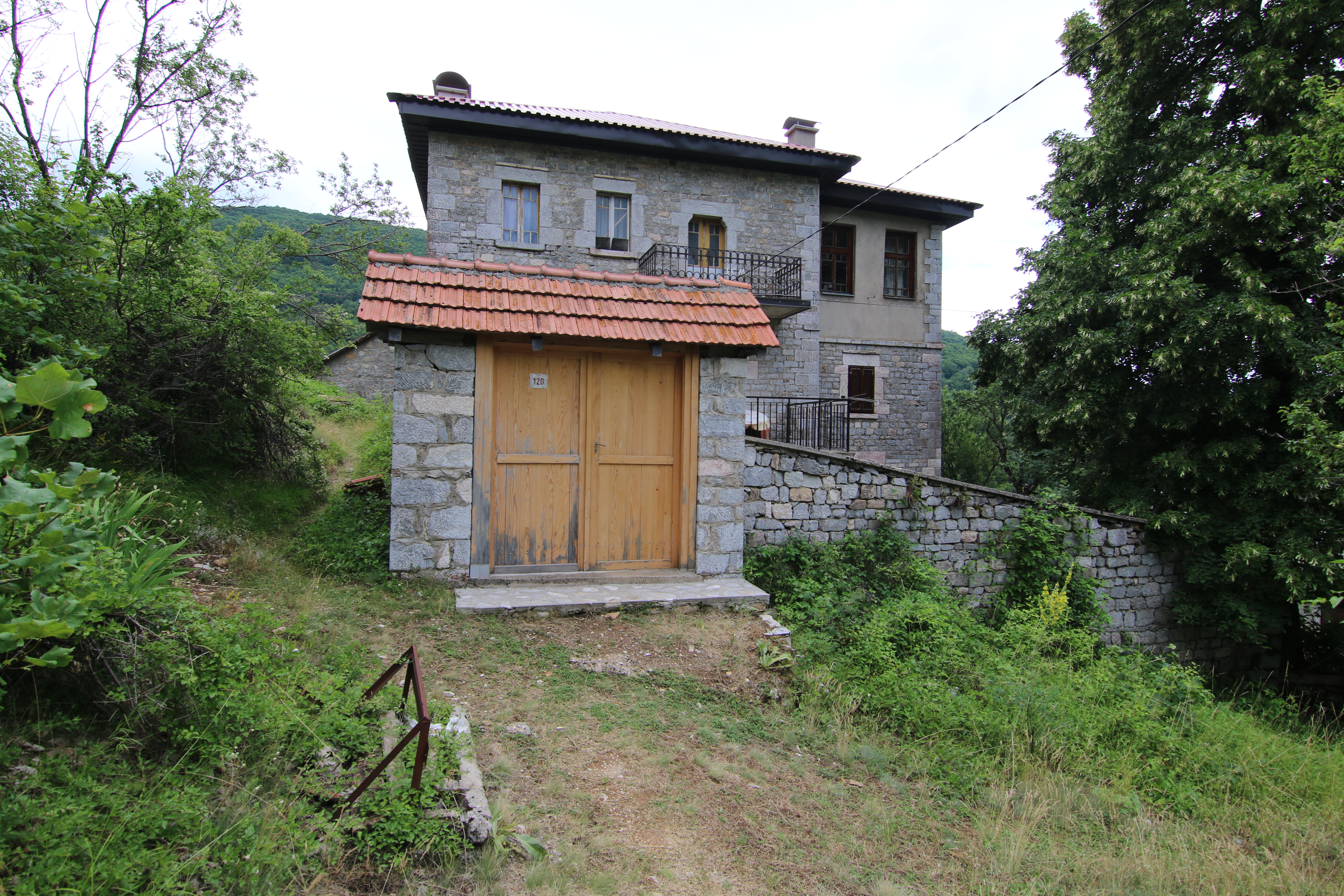
The front (west) side of the house.

The House of Jovan Muratovski is a historical house in Galičnik that is listed as Cultural heritage of North Macedonia. It is in ownership of one branch of the family of Muratovski.

== History of the family ==
Muratovski/Muratovci share ancestry roots with the families of Ondovci, Siljanovci and Šterjovci. The surname's origin derives from the family member called Filip. Their mainly occupation was sheep and cattle herding and production of yellow and white cheese. The family's financial and power peak was in 1912. Eight years later, Muratovski family was in great scale robbed by the Kalosh Zajasi's bandits. They are situated in the neighborhood called Čučka Maalo.

=== Notable members of the family ===
- Stale (1720-1775) ― progenitor of the family.
- Filip Muratovski (1820-1879) - Because of him, his family bears the surname. He was killed in Thessaly and was buried in the village of Acilari near Larissa. At the killing site, his family built a small church.
- Dragan L. Muratovski (1888-1975) ― he co-made a genealogy tree about his family.
- Efto S. Muratovski (1892-1963) ― he co-made a genealogy tree about his family.
- Mitre Muratovski ― local activist in the mid 20th century.
- Tomo Muratovski ― local sports activist in the mid 20th century.
- Mone Muratovski ― local sports activist in the mid 20th century.
- Nikola Muratovski - member and local activist of the League of Communist Youth of Yugoslavia.
- Ruža Muratovska ― member and local activist of the League of Communist Youth of Yugoslavia.
- Aleksa Muratovski ― he made financial statistics of the village in the period 1941-1942 during the Italian protectorate of Albania.
- Glugor Muratovski ― a professor and a doctor.
- Serafim 'Fimčo' Muratovski ― a professor and a conductor.
- Doksim Muratovski ― a journalist.
- Blaže Muratovski ― a lawyer.
- Rafail Muratovski ― a sculptor.
- Rubens Muratovski ― an actor.
- Marija Muratovska ― opera singer and pianist.
- Ivan Muratovski ― a forensic scientist specialized in graphanalysis.

== See also ==
- House of Iljo Filipovski
- House of Miloš and Dingo Melovski
- House of Pejčin Tomovski
- Galičnik Wedding Festival
