= House of Ruse Gegovski =

- Куќа на Русе Геговски; Kukja na Ruse Gegovski (Macedonian)
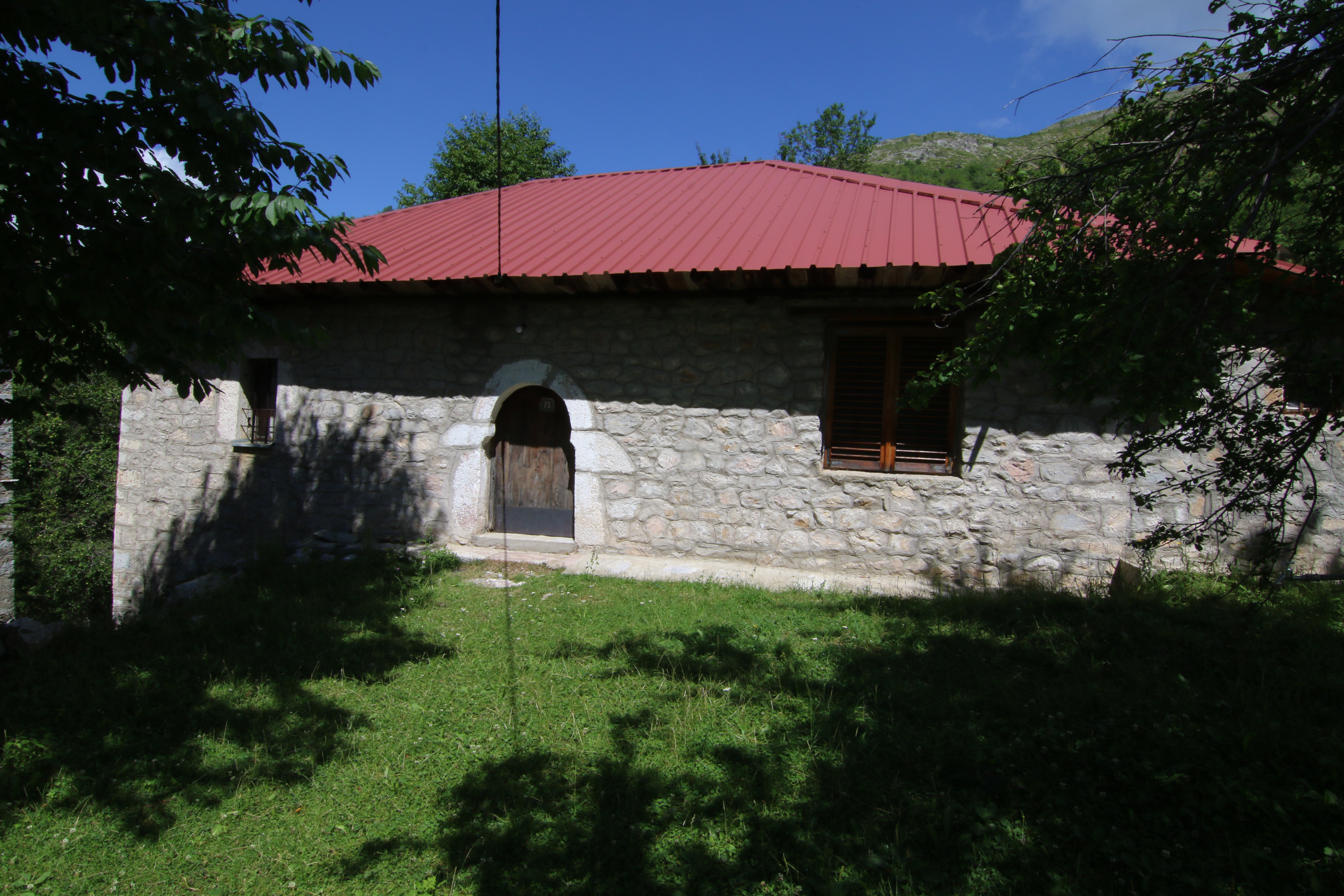
- Interactive map of House of Ruse Gegovski
- 41°35′47.34″N 20°39′05.31″E
- Type: House
- Location: Galičnik, North Macedonia

Site notes
- Governing body: Office for Protection of Cultural Heritage, Ministry of Culture
- Owner: Gegovski family

The House of Ruse Gegovski is a historical house in Galičnik that is listed as Cultural heritage of North Macedonia. It is in ownership of one branch of the family of Gegovski.

== History of the family ==
=== Notable members of the family ===
- Krste Gegoski ― local activist in the mid 20th century.
- Ivan Gegoski ― local activist in the mid 20th century.

== See also ==
- House of Boris and Tomo Bundalevski
- House of Tofe Keckarovski
- Galičnik Wedding Festival
