= House of Gjorgji and Despot Filipovski =

- Куќа на Ѓорѓи и Деспот Филиповски; Kukja na Gjorgji i Despot Filipovski (Macedonian)
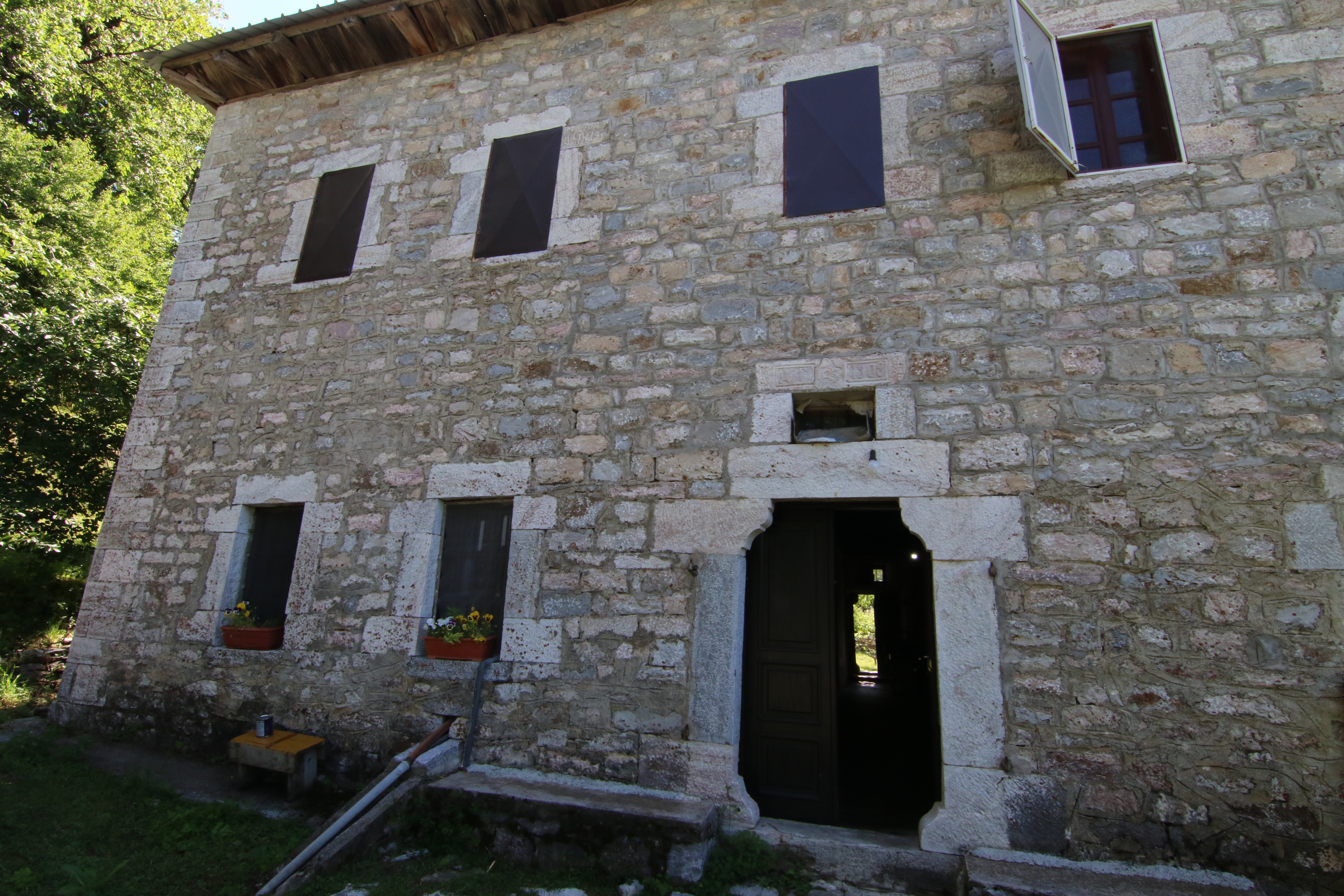
- Interactive map of House of Gjorgji and Despot Filipovski
- 41°35′39.81″N 20°39′23.48″E
- Type: House
- Location: Galičnik, North Macedonia

Site notes
- Governing body: Office for Protection of Cultural Heritage, Ministry of Culture
- Owner: Filipovski family

The House of Gjorgji and Despot Filipovski is a historical house in Galičnik that is listed as Cultural heritage of North Macedonia. It is in ownership of one branch of the family of Filipovski.

== History of the family ==
The family of Filipovci shares ancestral roots with the families of Golčevci, Sarievski, Drenkovci, Eftovci, Boškovci, Sekulovci and Bimbaškovci.

=== Notable members of the family ===
- Slavko ― progenitor of the family.
- Filip 'Glava' ― one of the richest sheep and cattle owners in the late 19th century.
- Jovan Filiposki ― son of Gjorgji.
- Kire Filipovski ― grandson of Filip 'Glava'
- Rade Filiposki ― member of the League of Communist Youth of Yugoslavia. He was secretary of the third local LCYY group.
- Dokse Filiposki ― partisan during the People Lberation war of Macedonia. He was kidnaped by a corrupted Albanian police officer in 1943 during the Italian protectorate of Albania.
- Niko Filiposki ― local activist in the mid 20th century.
- Pavle Filiposki ― local sports activist in the mid 20th century.
- Kosto Filiposki ― local activist in the mid 20th century.
- Dragan Filiposki ― local activist in the mid 20th century.
- The brothers Ilija, Blagoja, Filip and Vase Filipovski who gave endowment for renovation of the local and old Saint Paraskeva of the Balkans Church, as a commemoration of their parents Kire and Evgena.
- Milica Filiposka ― member of the Board for organizing the Galičnik Wedding Festival.
