= Teškoto =

Macedonian folk dance

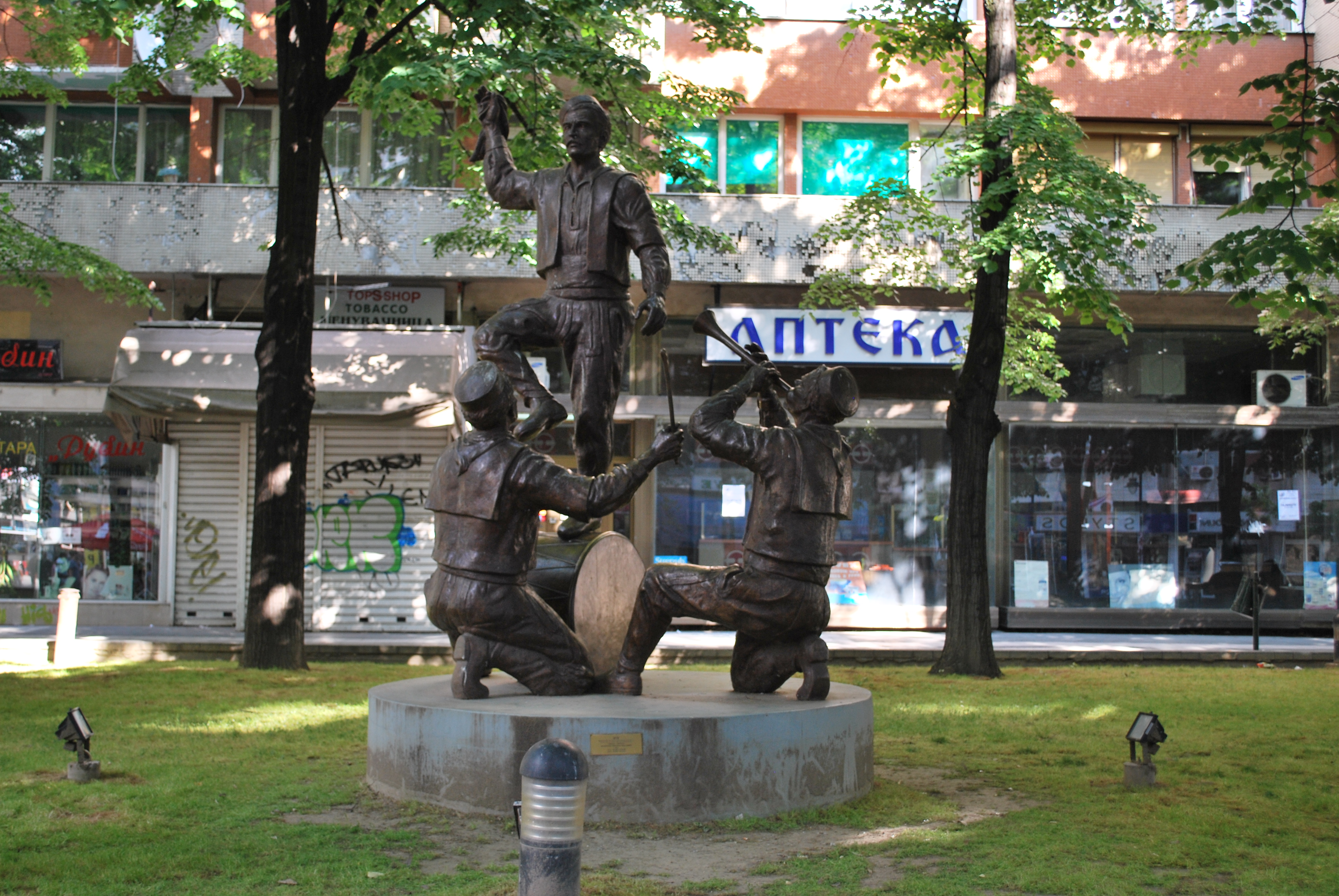
Monument of the dance in Skopje

Teškoto or Teshkoto (Macedonian: Тешкото, "the hard one"), is a folk dance from the Mijak ethnographic region, located in western Macedonia.

== History ==
The dance represents the hard life of people from the region. Its origins come from the period when locals were leaving their country for a better life, but over the years it has also grown as a symbol for all the pain caused in the region in the past. The dance has inspired Blaže Koneski's 1948 poem Teškoto. It has been the signature dance of Tanec after its formation in 1949. Teškoto has been traditionally performed in the western Macedonian mountainous region of Reka, as well as the villages of Galičnik, Lazaropole, and Gari. Apart from Eastern Orthodox people, dancers of Teškoto have also been the Torbeši. Traditionally, Albanian-speaking Muslim Romani people from Debar have been the performers of the music for the dance. It is a line dance in which the leader requires skills of improvisation. The dance begins with a slow and non-metric section where the dancers perform with precise lifts, steps, and leaps. The musicians must follow the leader, picking up on visual embodied cues. The music builds with a tempo, ending in a fast 2/4 section. Macedonia (now North Macedonia) attempted to include the dance in UNESCO's Masterpiece of Intangible Cultural Heritage list twice, in 2002 and 2004. A monument of the dance is in Skopje.

=== Galičnik Wedding Festival ===
Teškoto dance during the Galičnik Wedding Festival, North Macedonia

One of the most prominent festivals that feature the dance is the Galičnik Wedding Festival, an annual event in the Galičnik, one of the oldest villages in North Macedonia.
