= Residence of Jose Plačkovski =

House of Jose Plačkovski
- Куќа на Јосе Плачковски; Kukja na Jose Plačkovski (Macedonian)
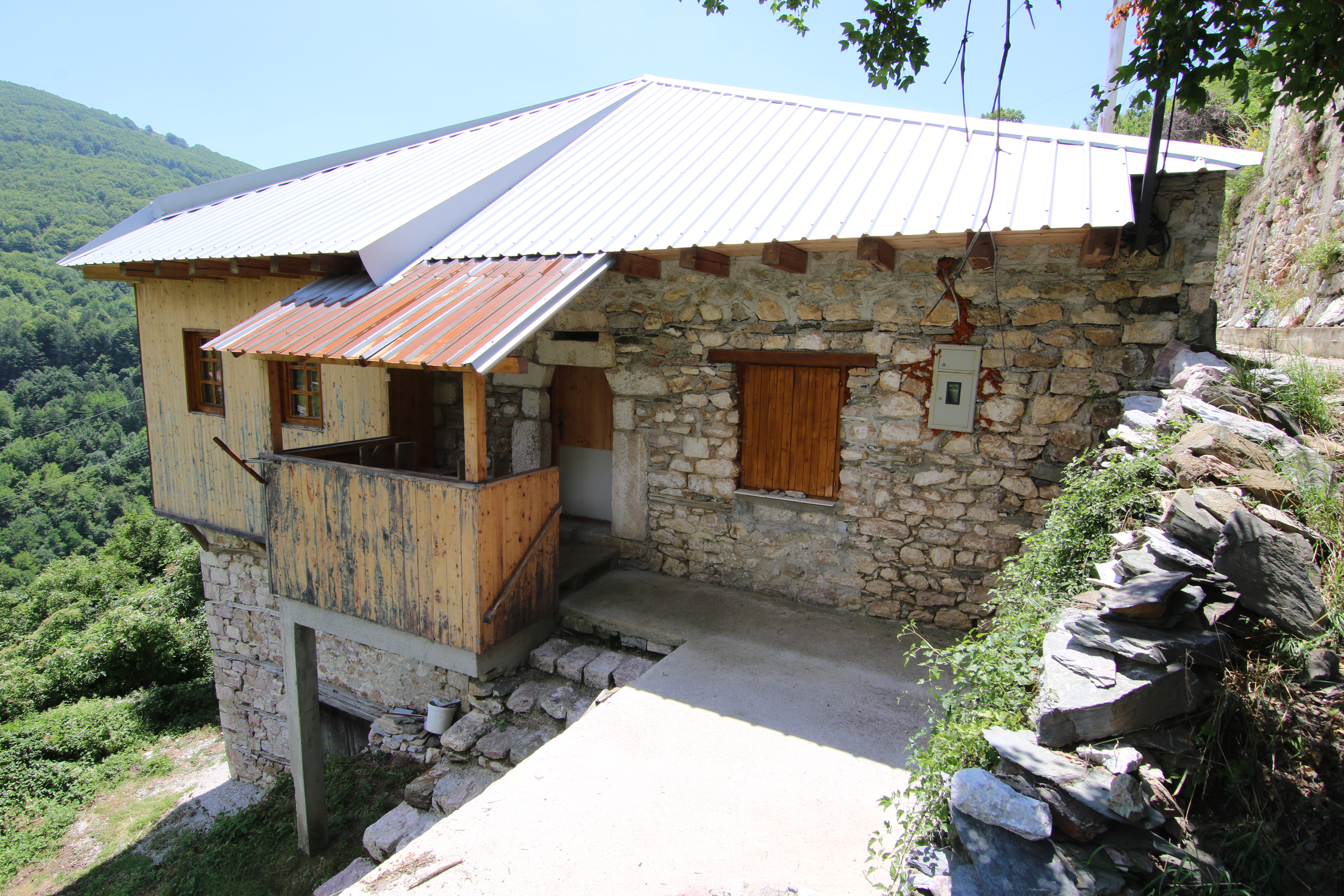
- Interactive map of House of Jose Plačkovski
- 41°35′34.57″N 20°38′58.33″E
- Type: House
- Location: Galičnik, North Macedonia

Site notes
- Governing body: Office for Protection of Cultural Heritage, Ministry of Culture
- Owner: Plačkovski family

The House of Jose Plačkovski is a historical house in Galičnik that is listed as Cultural heritage of North Macedonia. It is in ownership of one branch of the family of Plačkovski.

== See also ==
- House of Gjorgji Čalčevski
- Galičnik Wedding Festival
