= House of Vele Vankovski =

- Куќа на Веле Ванковски; Kukja na Vele Vankovski (Macedonian)
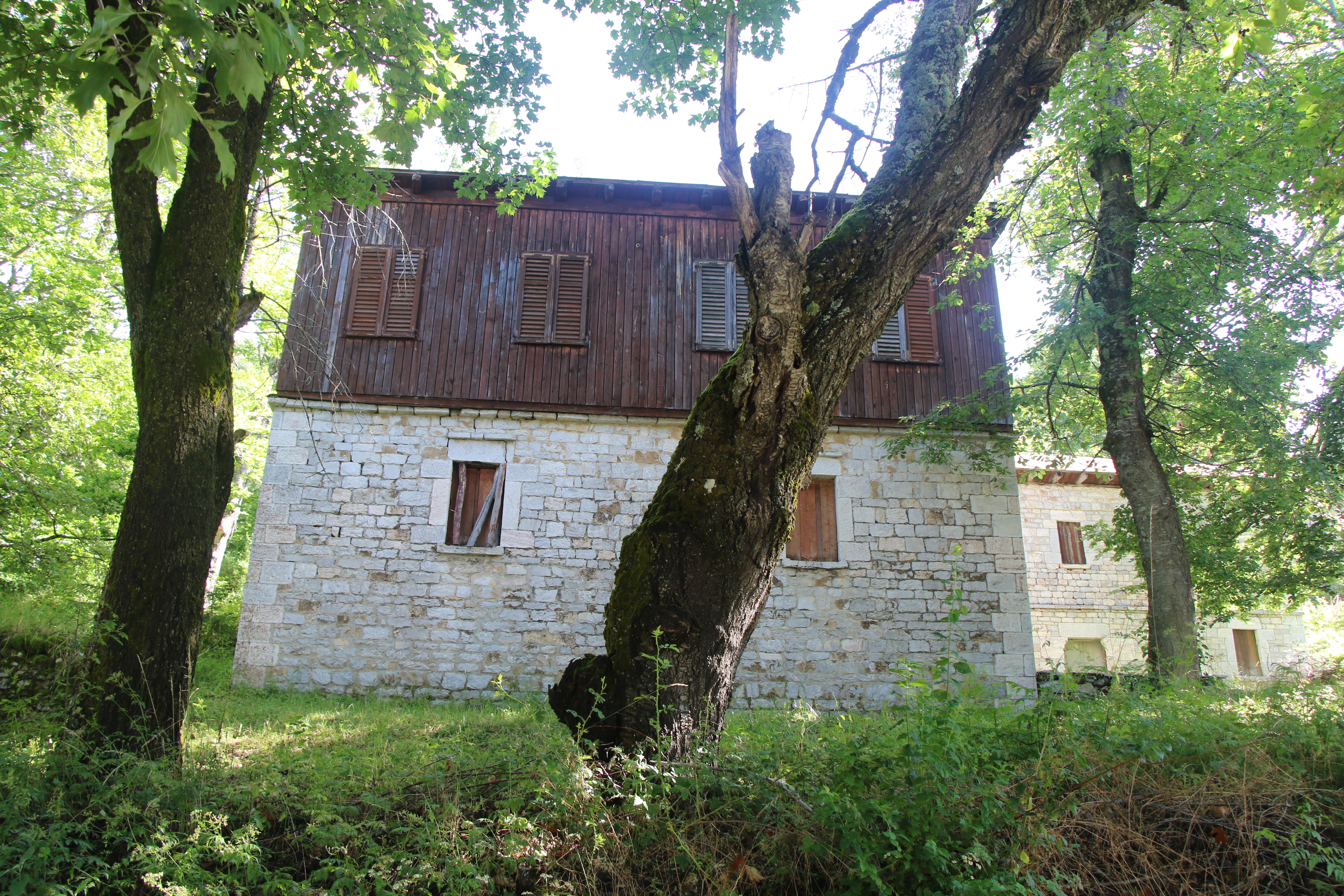
- Interactive map of House of Vele Vankovski
- 41°35′40.79″N 20°39′24.98″E
- Type: House
- Location: Galičnik, North Macedonia

Site notes
- Governing body: Office for Protection of Cultural Heritage, Ministry of Culture
- Owner: Vankovski/Pangovski family

The House of Vele Vankovski, also surnamed Pangovski, is a historical house in Galičnik that is listed as cultural heritage of North Macedonia. It is in ownership of one branch of the family of Pangovski/Vankovski.

== Family history ==
The Pangovski/Vankovski has its roots from the Duruzovci/Duruzovski family. There are two theories of the background of the Doruzovci: the first one is that they originated from the city of Durrës (modern day Albania) and the second being that Ilija's (one of the progenitors) grand father got the nickname Duruz that has a Turkish origin.

=== Members of the family ===
- Iljo Pangovski – member of the Communist Party of Yugoslavia
- Krste Pangovski – member of the League of Communist Youth of Yugoslavia and Communist Party of Yugoslavia
- Blaže Pangovski – member of the League of Communist Youth of Yugoslavia and Communist Party of Yugoslavia
- Velimir Vankovski – member of the League of Communist Youth of Yugoslavia and Communist Party of Yugoslavia
- Vele Vankovski – member of the Communist Party of Yugoslavia
- Nikola Vankovski – member of the Communist Party of Yugoslavia
- Lambe Vankovski – member of the Communist Party of Yugoslavia
