= House of Doksim and Efto Čadlovski =

- Куќа на Доксим и Ефто Чадловски; Kukja na Doksim i Efto Čadlovski (Macedonian)
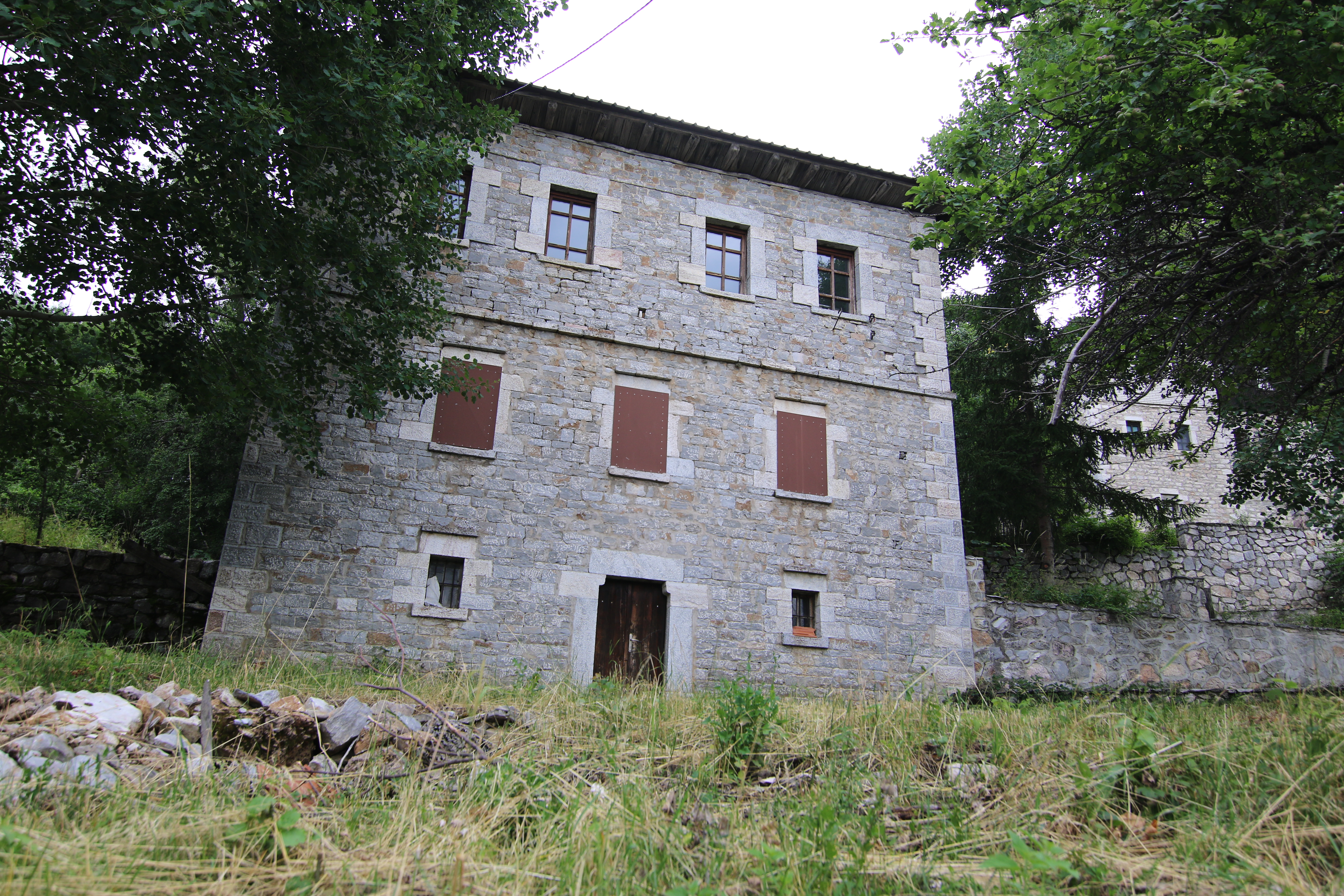
- Interactive map of House of Doksim and Efto Čadlovski
- 41°35′39.4″N 20°39′22.16″E
- Type: House
- Location: Galičnik, North Macedonia

Site notes
- Governing body: Office for Protection of Cultural Heritage, Ministry of Culture
- Owner: Čadlovski family

The House of Doksim and Efto Čadlovski is a historical house in Galičnik, North Macedonia, that is listed as Cultural heritage of North Macedonia. It is in ownership of one branch of the family of Čadlovski.

== Family history ==
=== Notable members of the family ===
- Gligur Čadlovski - member of the Communist Party of Yugoslavia
- Metodija Čadlovski - member of the League of Communist Youth of Yugoslavia.
