= Residence of Gjorgji Čalčevski =

House of Gjorgji Čalčevski
- Куќа на Ѓорѓи Чалчевски; Kukja na Gjorgji Čalčevski (Macedonian)
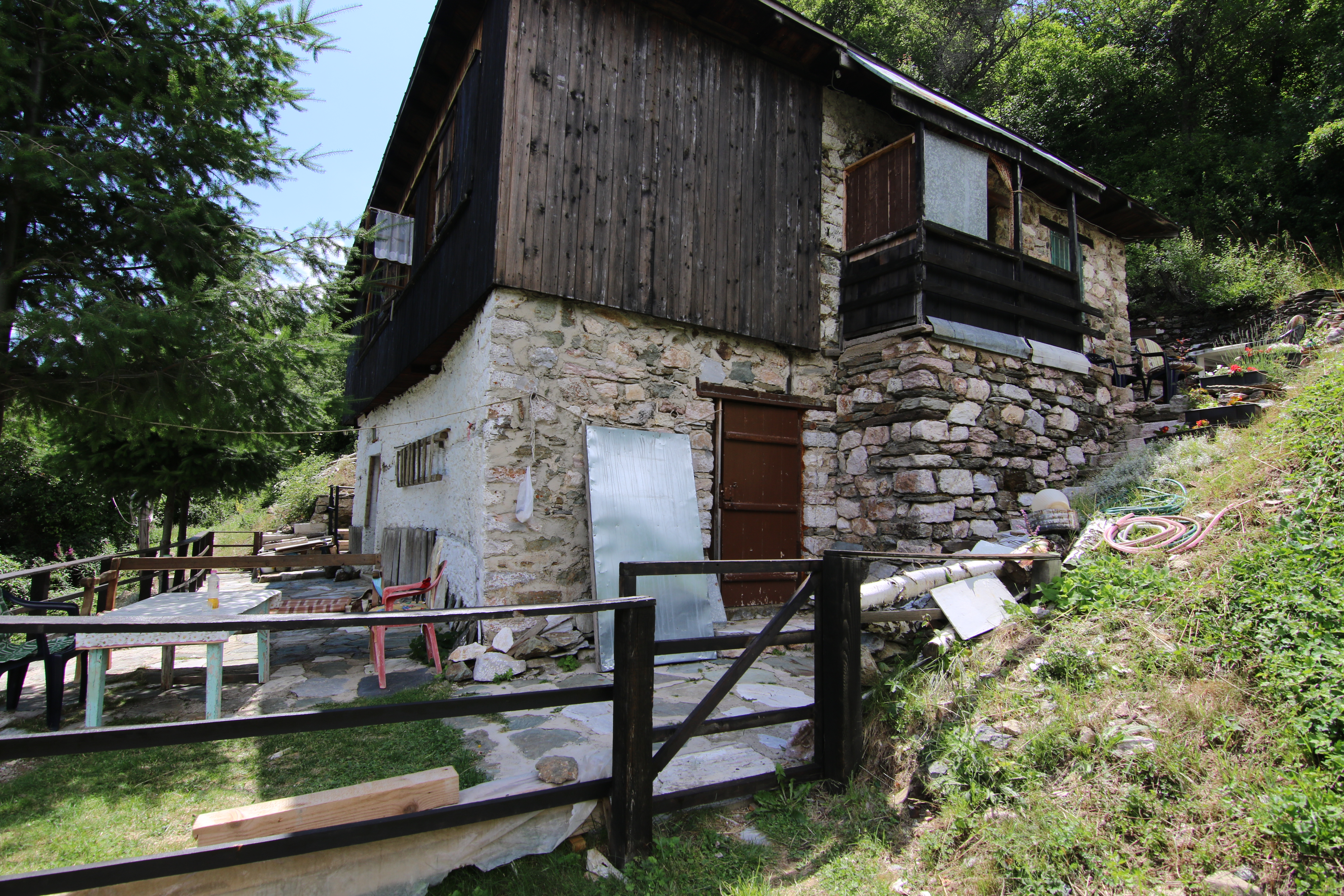
- Interactive map of House of Gjorgji Čalčevski
- 41°35′35.56″N 20°38′55.44″E
- Type: House
- Location: Galičnik, North Macedonia

Site notes
- Governing body: Office for Protection of Cultural Heritage, Ministry of Culture
- Owner: Čalčevski family

The House of Gjorgji Čalčevski is a historical house in Galičnik that is listed as Cultural heritage of North Macedonia. It is in ownership of one branch of the family of Čalčevski.

== See also ==
- House of Jose Plačkovski
- Galičnik Wedding Festival
