= House of Pavle Cincarovski =

- Куќа на Павле Цинцаровски; Kukja na Pavle Cincarovski (Macedonian)
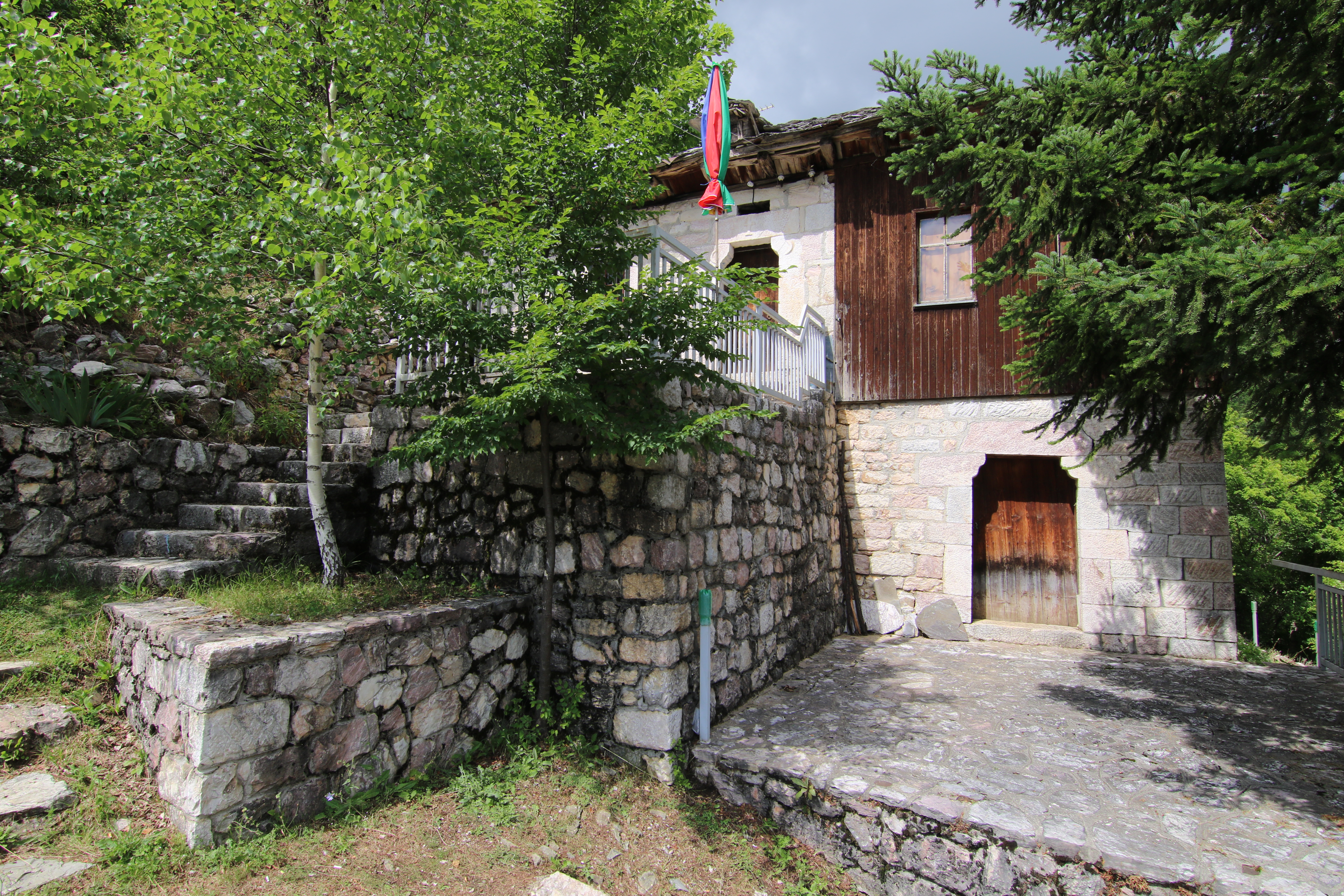
- Interactive map of House of Pavle Cincarovski
- 41°35′42.43″N 20°39′01″E
- Type: House
- Location: Galičnik, North Macedonia

Site notes
- Governing body: Office for Protection of Cultural Heritage, Ministry of Culture
- Owner: Cincarovski family

The House of Pavle Cincarovski is a historical house in Galičnik that is listed as Cultural heritage of North Macedonia. It is in ownership of one branch of the family of Cincarovski.

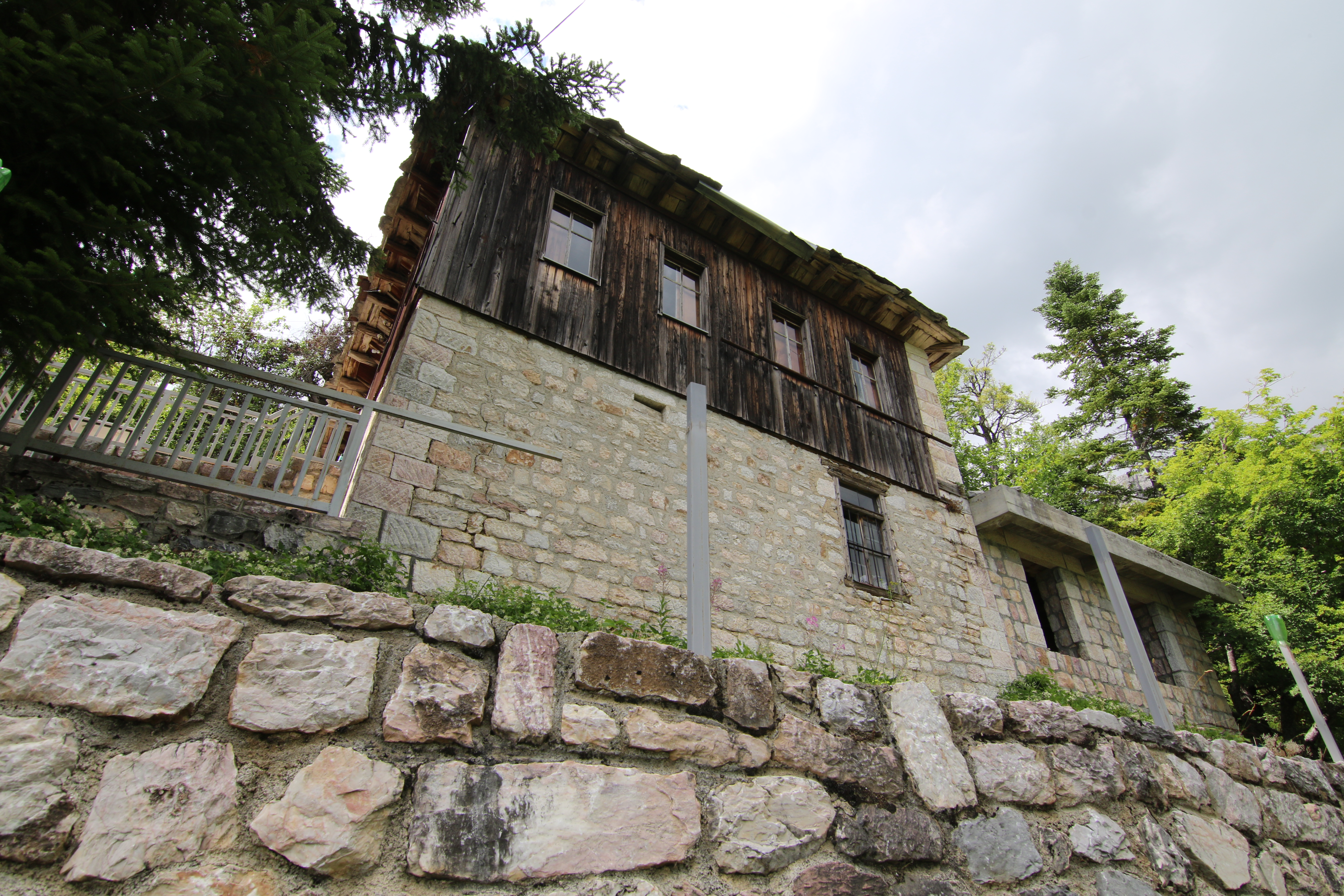
The South-Eastern wall of the house.

== Family history ==
=== Members of the family ===
- Stojan Cincarovski - participant in the Ilinden Uprising. He was killed in 1911 by Albanian bandits in the locality called Pokorita.
