= House of Boris and Tomo Bundalevski =

- Куќа на Петре и Миле Желчевски; Kukja na Boris i Tomo Bundalevski (Macedonian)
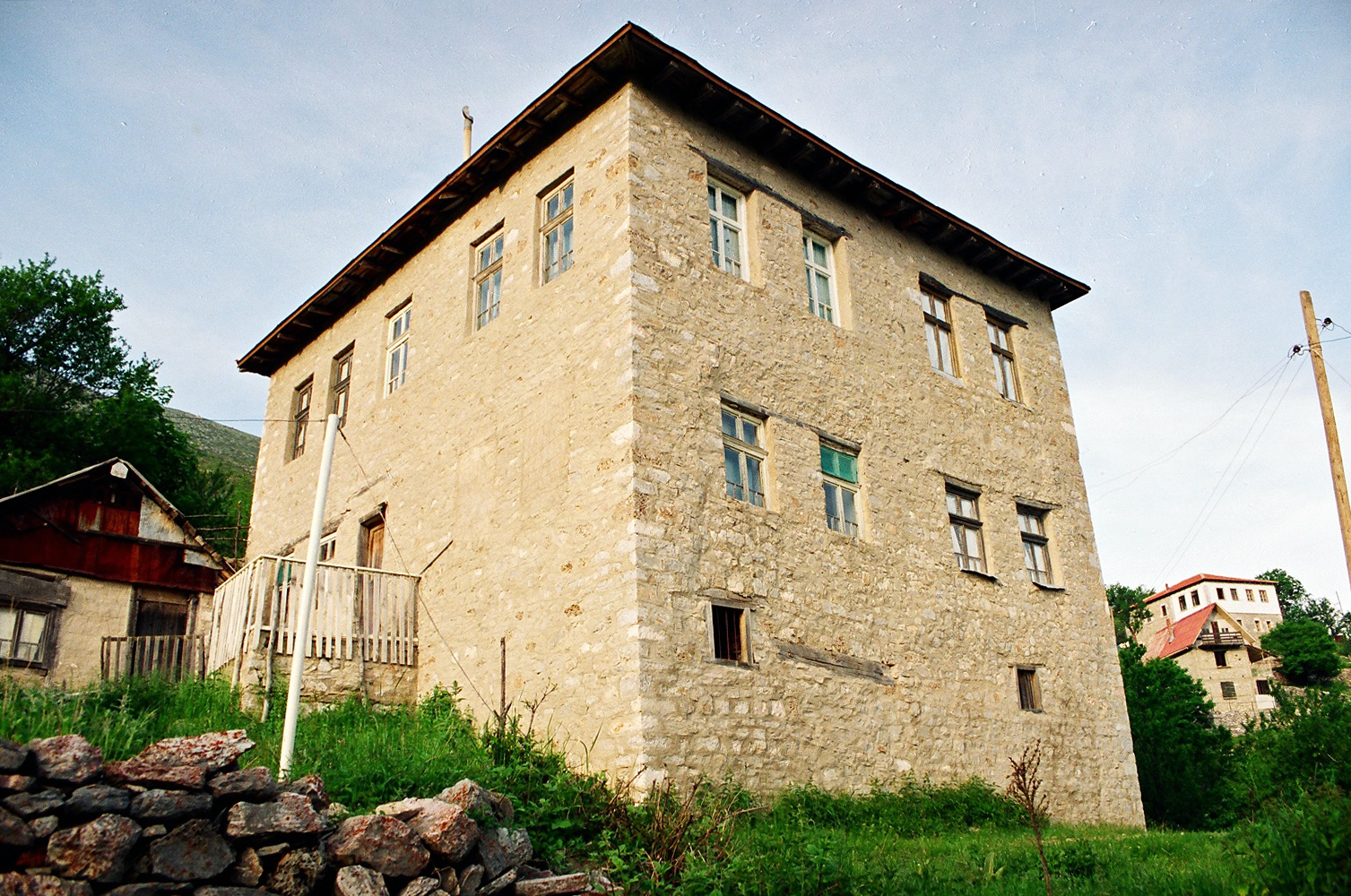
- Interactive map of House of Boris and Tomo Bundalevski
- 41°35′43.62″N 20°39′05.87″E
- Type: House
- Location: Galičnik, North Macedonia

Site notes
- Governing body: Office for Protection of Cultural Heritage, Ministry of Culture
- Owner: Bundalevski family

The House of Boris and Tomo Bundalevski is a historical house in Galičnik that is listed as Cultural heritage of North Macedonia. It is in ownership of the family of Bundalevski.

== History of the family ==
The family of Bundalevci stems from the family of Ognenovci. From Ognenovci, they share roots with the families of Karadakovci, Luzevci, Marevci, Ževairovci, Želčevci, Venovci, Šotarovci, Bislimovci and Tripunovci.

=== Notable members of the family ===
- Bundale ― progenitor of the family.
- Gjino Bundaleski ― son of Bundale. When he was 80 years old, he survived a plague and his close family died. Then he married a young woman from the village of Gari. She already had a 13-year-old son by the name Jovan.
- Jovan Bundaleski - adopted son of Gjino.
- Boris Bundaleski - local activist in the mid 20th century.
- Pavle Bundaleski - local activist in the mid 20th century.
- Sofre Bundaleski - member of the Communist Party of Yugoslavia
- Rafe Bundaleski - member of the Communist Party of Yugoslavia
