= Lazaropole =

Lazaropole Лазарополе
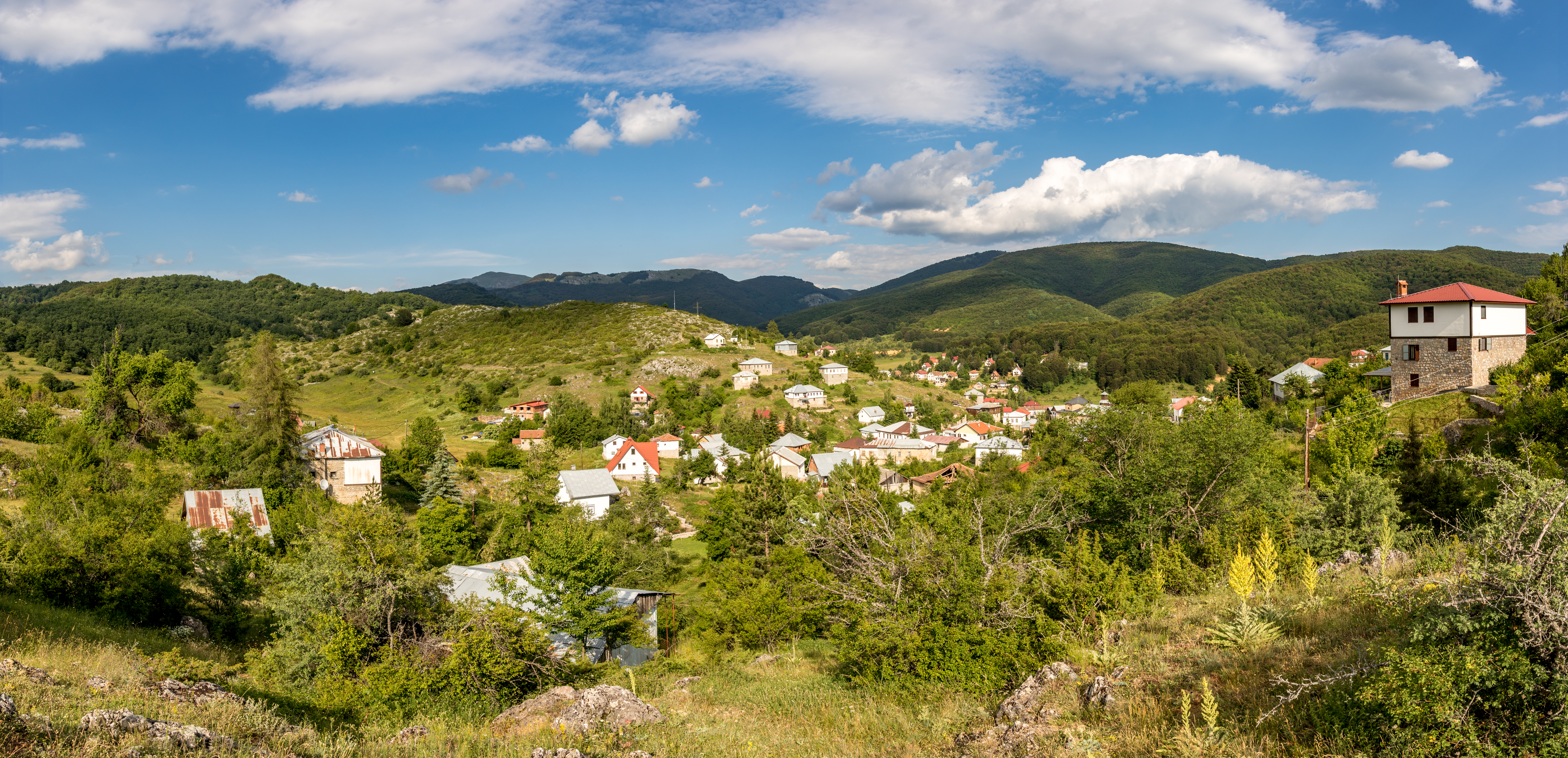
- Panoramic view of the village

- Location within North Macedonia
- Coordinates: 41°32′10″N 20°41′38″E
- Country: North Macedonia
- Region: Polog
- Municipality: Mavrovo and Rostuša

Population (2021)
  - Total: 29
- Time zone: UTC+1 (CET)
  - Summer (DST): UTC+2 (CEST)

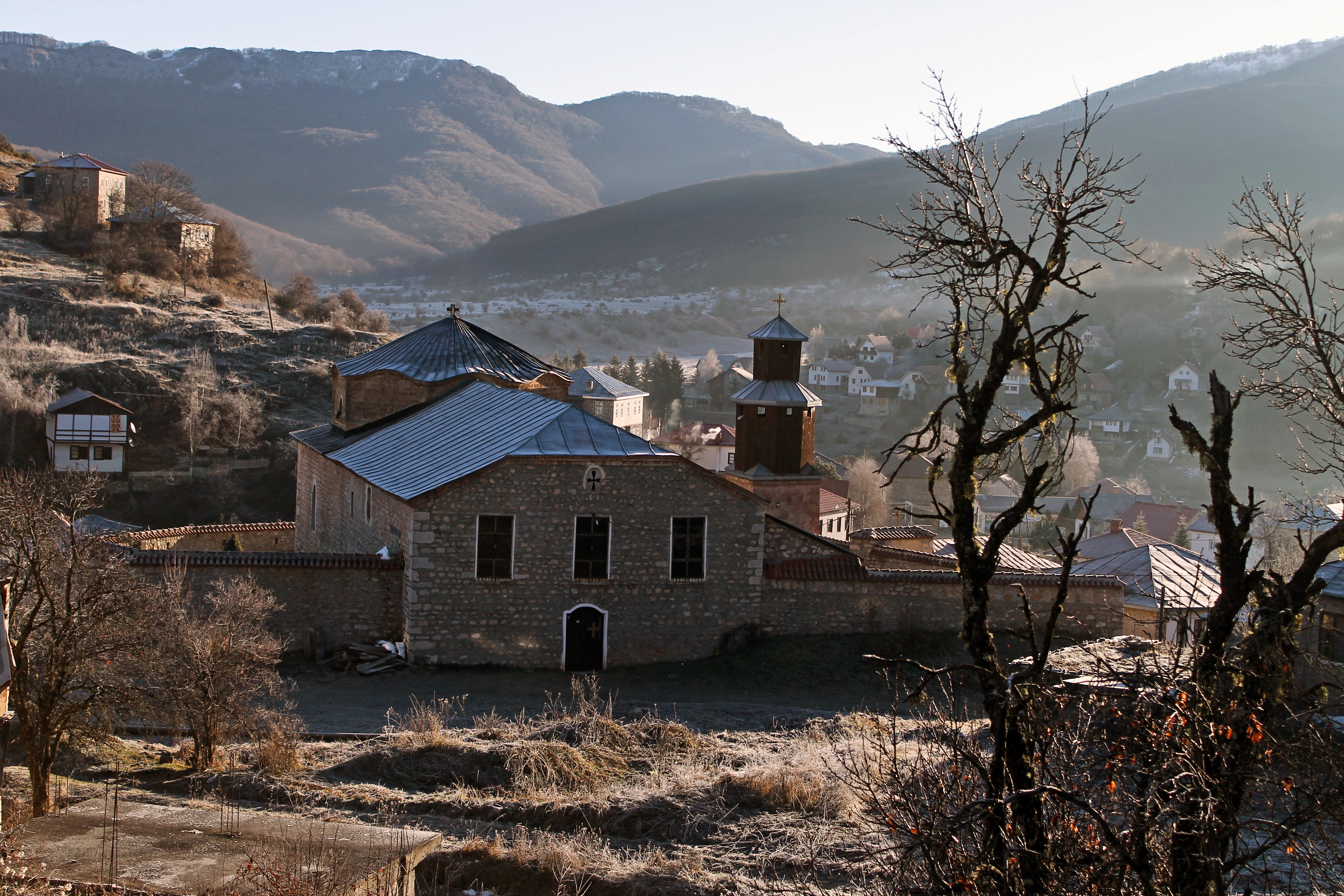
Lazaropole St. George's Church (Lazaropole)

Lazaropole (Macedonian: Лазарополе) is a village in the Municipality of Mavrovo and Rostuša, North Macedonia. Situated on a plateau at Mount Bistra and surrounded by beech and oak forest; at 1,350 m altitude, it is one of the highest settlements in the country.

== Demographics ==
Lazaropole is not attested in the Ottoman defter of 1467.

According to the 2021 census, the village had a total of 29 inhabitants, including 28 ethnic Macedonians and one Serb.

== People born in Lazaropole ==
- Isaija Mažovski, painter and writer

== Climate ==
Climate data for Lazaropole (1961–1990, extremes 1973–present)
| Month | Jan | Feb | Mar | Apr | May | Jun | Jul | Aug | Sep | Oct | Nov | Dec | Year |
|---|---|---|---|---|---|---|---|---|---|---|---|---|---|
| Record high °C (°F) | 16.8 (62.2) | 16.7 (62.1) | 23.8 (74.8) | 24.3 (75.7) | 28.3 (82.9) | 30.7 (87.3) | 38.6 (101.5) | 38.3 (100.9) | 31.6 (88.9) | 27.5 (81.5) | 25.3 (77.5) | 17.4 (63.3) | 38.6 (101.5) |
| Mean daily maximum °C (°F) | 2.2 (36.0) | 3.0 (37.4) | 6.1 (43.0) | 10.6 (51.1) | 15.5 (59.9) | 18.9 (66.0) | 22.2 (72.0) | 22.3 (72.1) | 18.7 (65.7) | 13.3 (55.9) | 8.0 (46.4) | 4.0 (39.2) | 12.1 (53.8) |
| Daily mean °C (°F) | −1.9 (28.6) | −1.5 (29.3) | 1.4 (34.5) | 5.6 (42.1) | 10.4 (50.7) | 13.6 (56.5) | 16.0 (60.8) | 15.5 (59.9) | 12.2 (54.0) | 7.7 (45.9) | 3.4 (38.1) | −0.5 (31.1) | 6.8 (44.2) |
| Mean daily minimum °C (°F) | −5.9 (21.4) | −5.0 (23.0) | −2.8 (27.0) | 1.1 (34.0) | 5.0 (41.0) | 7.8 (46.0) | 9.4 (48.9) | 9.4 (48.9) | 7.0 (44.6) | 3.5 (38.3) | 0.0 (32.0) | −3.9 (25.0) | 2.1 (35.8) |
| Record low °C (°F) | −19.0 (−2.2) | −23.4 (−10.1) | −18.5 (−1.3) | −14.7 (5.5) | −9.1 (15.6) | −0.3 (31.5) | 1.0 (33.8) | 0.9 (33.6) | −4.0 (24.8) | −8.0 (17.6) | −14.0 (6.8) | −18.5 (−1.3) | −23.4 (−10.1) |
| Average precipitation mm (inches) | 103.8 (4.09) | 94.8 (3.73) | 99.2 (3.91) | 85.6 (3.37) | 87.1 (3.43) | 59.2 (2.33) | 46.8 (1.84) | 50.8 (2.00) | 68.2 (2.69) | 95.5 (3.76) | 145.3 (5.72) | 130.8 (5.15) | 1,067.1 (42.01) |
| Average precipitation days (≥ 1.0 mm) | 11 | 11 | 11 | 11 | 10 | 8 | 5 | 6 | 6 | 8 | 11 | 12 | 110 |
| Average relative humidity (%) | 79 | 78 | 74 | 71 | 71 | 71 | 67 | 69 | 73 | 75 | 77 | 80 | 74 |
| Mean monthly sunshine hours | 104.2 | 105.7 | 140.8 | 161.6 | 197.3 | 223.9 | 289.4 | 274.0 | 225.5 | 172.6 | 117.8 | 83.4 | 2,106.2 |
Source 1: NOAA
Source 2: Meteo Climat (record highs and lows)

== See also ==
- Galičnik
