= House of Miloš and Dingo Melovski =

- Куќа на Милош и Динго Меловски; Kukja na Miloš and Dingo Melovski (Macedonian)
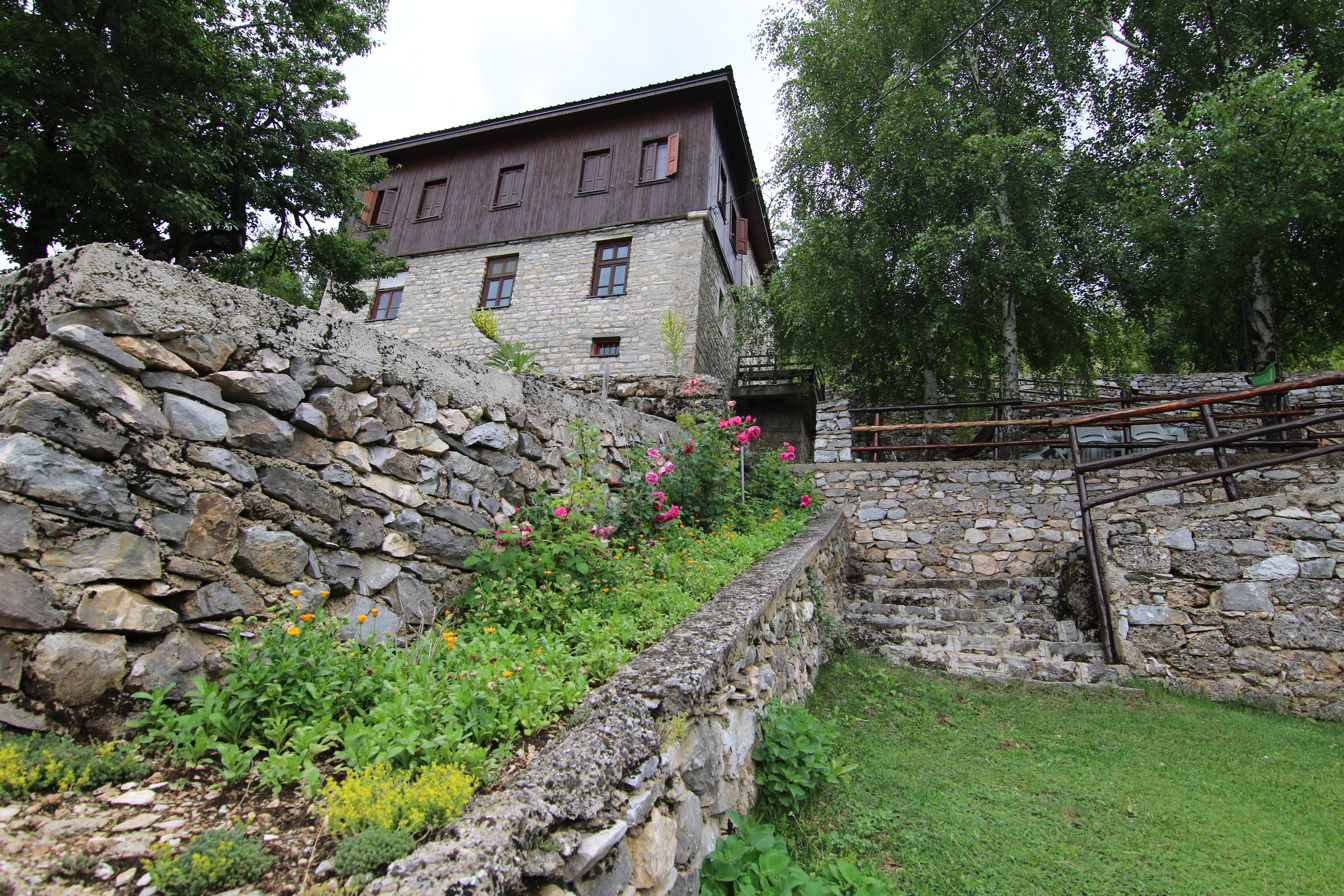
- Interactive map of House of Miloš and Dingo Melovski
- 41°35′37.02″N 20°39′13.02″E
- Type: House
- Location: Galičnik, North Macedonia

History
- Built: 1910; 116 years ago

Site notes
- Governing body: Office for Protection of Cultural Heritage, Ministry of Culture
- Owner: Melovski family

The House of Miloš and Dingo Melovski is a historical house in Galičnik that is listed as Cultural heritage of North Macedonia. It is in ownership of the two branches of the family of Melovski.

== House and family history ==
The house was built in 1910 by the Filipovski family, i.e. it was built at the time when two of the four brothers, Arse and Ilija, decided to build houses on that place. This house, on the front and above the porch door, bears the name of Arse. One of Arce's sons, Dojčin, built a third house next to this house, but that house was demolished. Arese's second son, Riste, had three children: Jakov, Kare and Olga. Kare and Jacov had no offspring and probably died young. Thus, the whole house belonged to Olga Filipovska. In the early 1920s (probably 1923), Olga married Jovan Melovski. Jovan moved at his wife's house and since then this house has become a Melovski owned house. Jovan and Olga had six children: Miloš, Risto, Dingo, Ilija. Dragica and Mara. In 1964, Jovan, due to the great need for teachers, got the opportunity to teach as a teacher in Skopje. According to 2021, the house is maintained and used by the descendants of Risto, Dingo and Ilija.

=== Notable members of the family ===
Jovan Meloski - teacher and principal of the Galičnik school.
