= Galičnik Wedding Festival =

Annual festival in Galičnik, Macedonia

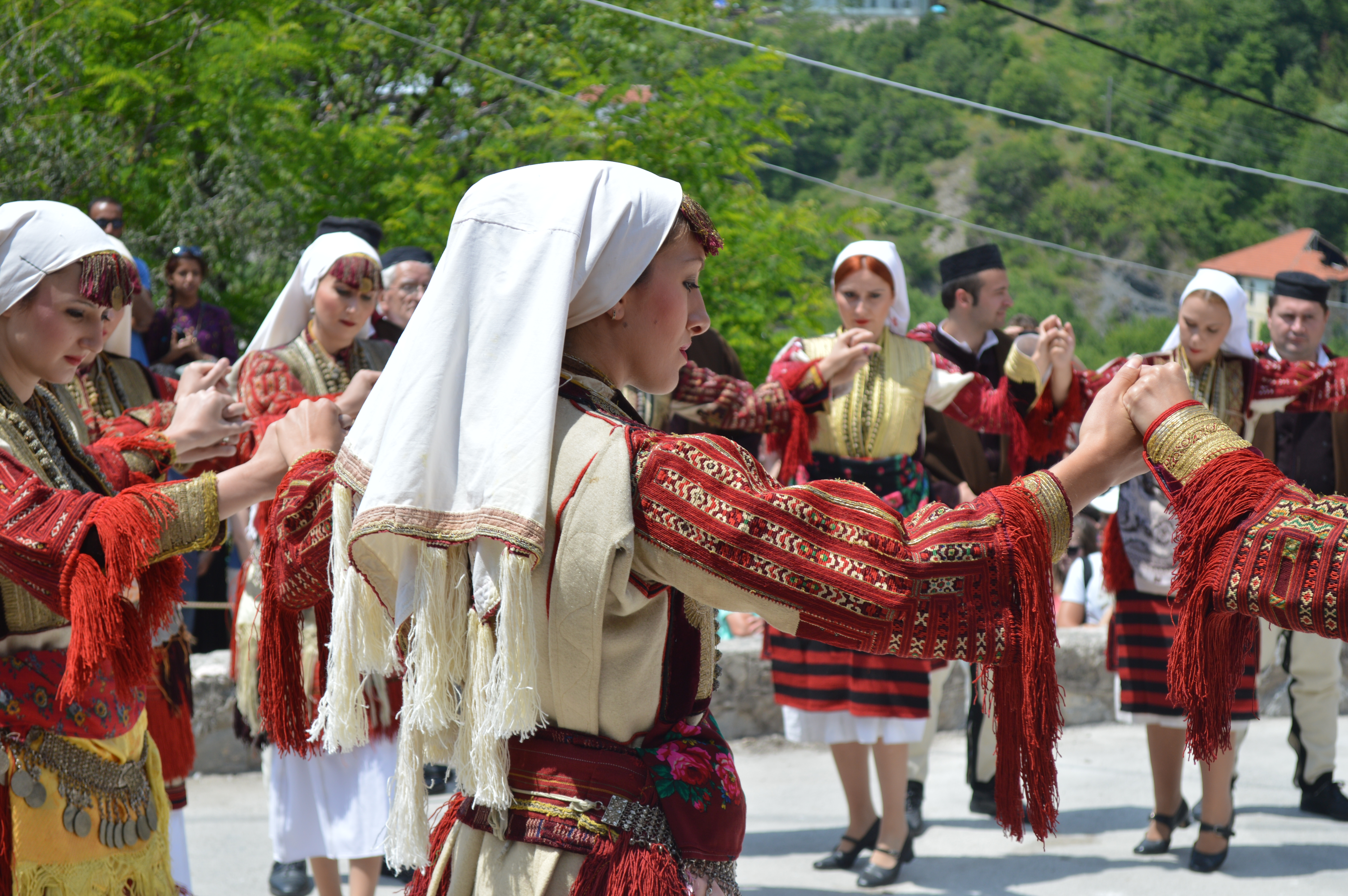
Traditional dance at Galičnik Wedding

The Galičnik Wedding Festival (Macedonian: Галичка свадба, romanized: Galička svadba) is an annual festival held in the village of Galičnik (North Macedonia) near the city of Debar in which a selected couple gets married in the traditional "Galička" style wedding. Traditionally the wedding lasted for 5 days with the main activities on St. Peter and Paul's Day (12 July) every year. It was the only period of the year when couples got married. Today it is part of the festival "Galičko Leto" (Galičnik Summer) and it is a two-day event held on the weekend nearest to 12 July and it serves as a cultural and tourist attraction.

During the wedding, men dance Teškoto, symbolizing the farewell moments of the local villagers who were leaving their homes to work abroad.

Each year, couples from all over North Macedonia enter a competition run by the organisers to be the couple that gets to have a "Galička" style wedding. Every year, a new couple gets the opportunity.
