= Galičnik =

Galičnik Галичник
- Village
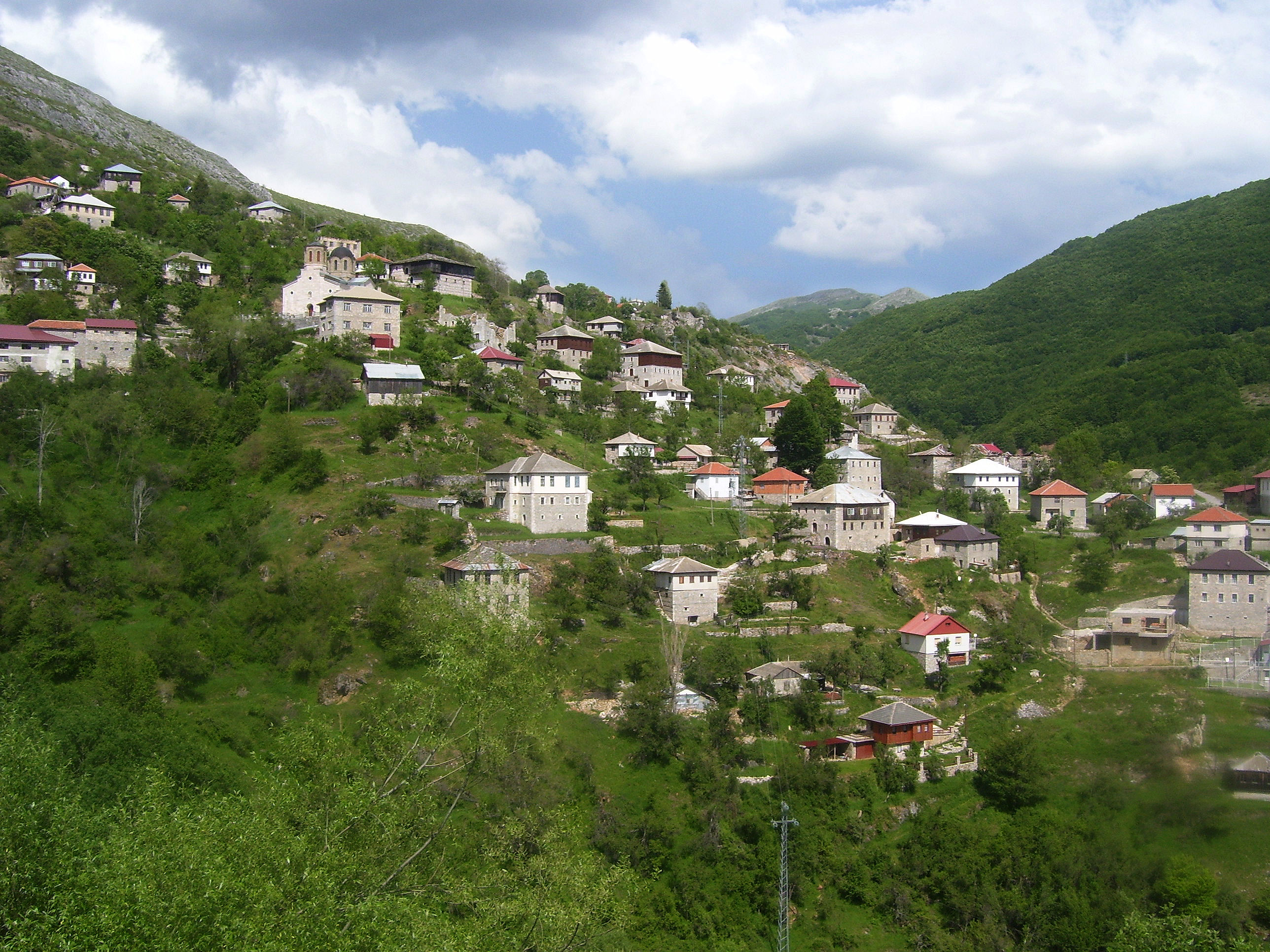

- Location within North Macedonia
- Coordinates: 41°35′39″N 20°39′11″E
- Country: North Macedonia
- Region: Polog
- Municipality: Mavrovo and Rostuša
- Highest elevation: 1,500 m (4,900 ft)

Population (2021)
  - Total: 48
- Time zone: UTC+1 (CET)
  - Summer (DST): UTC+2 (CEST)
- Car plates: GV

Galičnik (Macedonian: Галичник) is a mountain village in North Macedonia and along with Lazaropole is one of the two biggest and oldest Mijak villages in the region. Galičnik has well-preserved traditional architecture, including an amphitheater in the village square, and is famous for its surrounding countryside and nature reserve. The village is known for the Galička Svadba, a traditional wedding custom held annually in summer (in July), on the day of the village feast of the Patron Saint – Petrovden (St. Peter's day). During the wedding, local men will dance the "Teškoto" (the "hard" or "heavy").

== History ==
Galičnik has traditionally been identified as a Mijak village.

Galičnik (Galiçnik) is attested in the Ottoman defter of 1467 as a village in the ziamet of Reka which was under the authority of Karagöz Bey. The village appears as uninhabited.

At the end of the 19th century, Galičnik was a large Bulgarian palanka, with its inhabitants engaged in masonry and animal husbandry - mainly sheep breeding. According to Ethnographie des Vilayets D'Andrinople, de Monastir, et de Salonique, published in Constantinople in 1878, the village had a total of 500 houses, with 1482 Orthodox Bulgarians.

In statistics gathered by Vasil Kanchov in 1900, the village of Galičnik was inhabited by 3300 Orthodox Bulgarians.

At the beginning of the 20th century, the entire Christian population of the village was under the rule of the Bulgarian Exarchate. According to the Secretary of the Exarchate Dimitar Mishev ("La Macédoine et sa Population Chrétienne”) in 1905 there were 4840 Bulgarian Exarchists in Galičnik and a Bulgarian school operated in the village.

According to statistics from the newspaper " Debarski Glas " in 1911, there were 560 Bulgarian exarchate and 20 patriarchal houses in Galičnik (since 1892). A Serbian school operates in the village with 1 male and 1 female teacher and 22 students.

On his 1929 ethnic map of Northwestern Macedonia, Afanasy Selishchev marked Galičnik as a Bulgarian village.

== Architecture ==
The village is built based on traditional housing standards used for centuries in the region. Stone wall construction, supported by wooden beams, compact earth insulation and using stone slate roofing.

There are many houses owned by prominent families in Galičnik that are protected by the Macedonian Cultural Heritage Protection Office. A selected few are as follows:

- House of Jovan Muratovski
- House of Pejčin Tomovski
- House of Miloš and Dingo Melovski
- House of Pavle Cincarovski
- Residence of Gjorgji Čalčevski
- House of Doksim and Efto Čadlovski

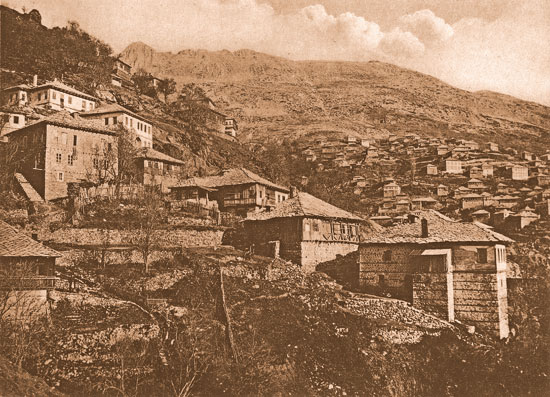

== Notable people from Galičnik ==
- Slavko Brezoski (1921-2017)
- Lazar Ličenoski (1901-1964)
- Doksim Mihailović (1883–1912)
- Risto Ognjanovikj-Lonoski (1870-1941)
- Georgi Pulevski (1817–1895)
- Aleksandar Sarievski (1922–2002)
- Partenij Zografski (died 1876)
