= Said Najdeni =

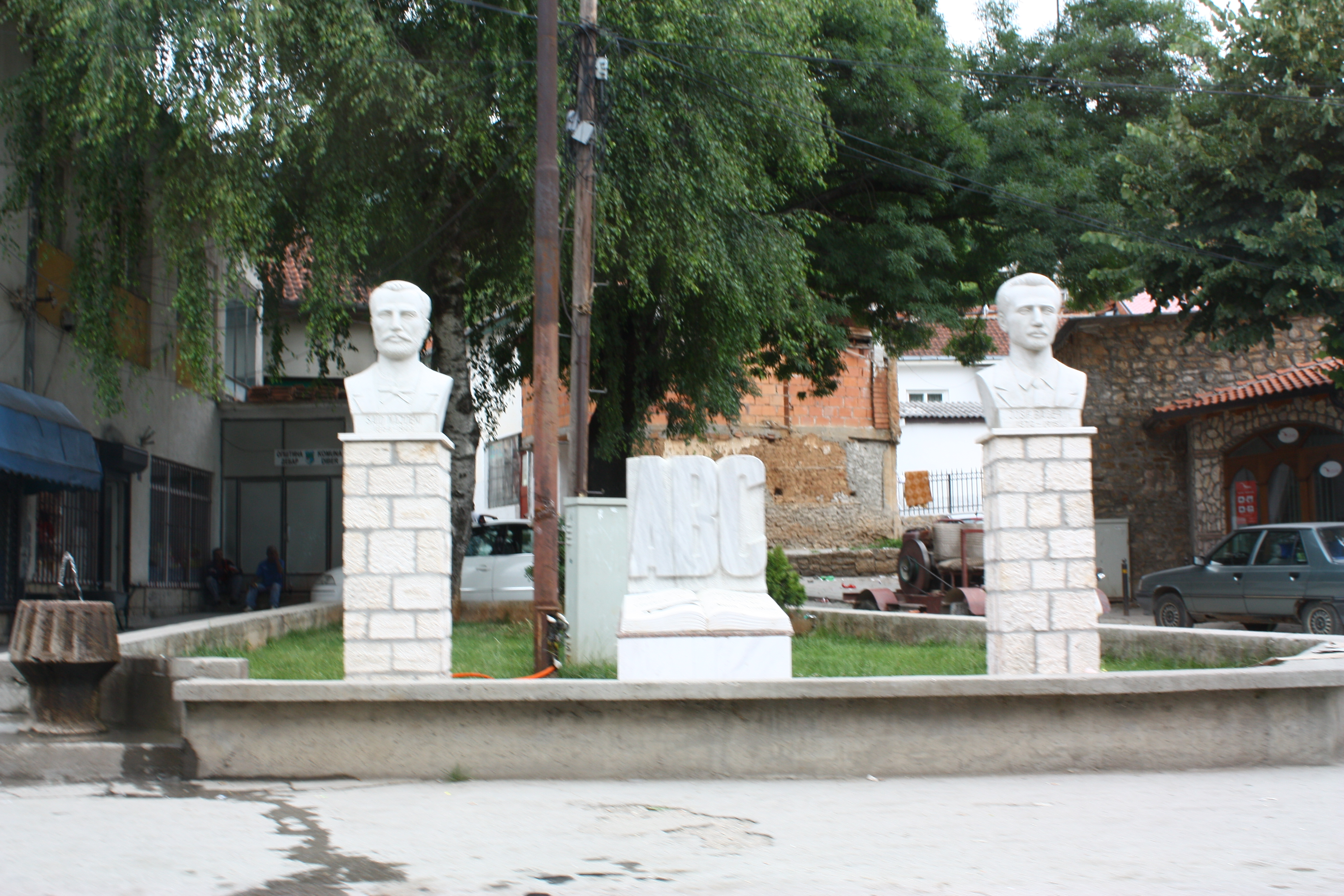
Busts of Najdeni and Josif Bageri in Debar

Said Najdeni ( Debar, 1864 – November 21, 1903), also known as Hoxha Voka, was an Albanian Islamic scholar and activist in the Albanian National Awakening.

== Biography ==
Najdeni was born in Shehër near Debar as the son of Islam and Esma Najdeni. Islam was a craftsman, and Said was the first in the family to complete his formal schooling in 1882. He went on to enroll in theology studies at Hajdar Pasha Madrasa in Istanbul.

In Istanbul, he met other supporters of the Albanian National Awakening, including Ismail Kemal, Naim Frashëri and Sami Frashëri. Aware of conditions at home, he returned after his 1888 graduation with primers on the Albanian language from the Istanbul-based Society for the Publication of Albanian Letters, beginning to teach from them in Debar that same year. He also taught elsewhere in Dibër County, such as the villages of Gollobordë, Grykë të Vogël, Bllacë (near Bulqizë), Maqellarë, Brezhdan, and Dohoshisht. Assisting him in his promotion of the language were apprentice boys at the Debar bazaar.

In 1895, Najdeni was arrested for activities the Ottoman authorities deemed subversive and jailed in Edirne. Upon his return in 1896, Najdeni joined students (including Shaqir Daci, Shyqyri Qoku, Kadri Fishta, Hamdi Ohri, Nazif Sharofi, and Hajdar Varvarica) in founding a secret course for reading and writing Albanian in the house of Abdullah Manjani, the first such class taught in the region. Detained again and released in 1897, Najdani promoted the cause of Albanian-language education in Ohrid, Struga, and Elbasan. He corresponded with émigré organizations such as the Dituria Society in Bucharest and the Deshira Society in Sofia as well as with publishers in Kosovo and Central Albania from which he sourced books and National Awakening texts for use in Debar. Sami Frashëri’s primer was particularly popular, as attested by the Austro-Hungarian Consul in Bitola, August Ritter von Kral:

Hundreds of people in Debar learned to write in Albanian. By 1899, more than 300 residents of Debar had learned to read and write in Albanian.

As was a common tactic of bribery to mollify independence activists, Najdeni was offered Ottoman administrative posts and a lecturer’s post at the Sultan Ahmet Madrasa in Istanbul. Considering Tosk Albanian difficult for the people of Debar, Hoxha Voka published Abetare e gjuhës shqipe ndë të folë gegënisht (“Primer in the Albanian Language for Speakers of Gheg Albanian in Sofia and the religious tract Ferrëfenja myslimane (“Muslim Brotherhood”) in 1900 with Kristo Luarasi’s publishing house Mbrothësia.

Along with the League of Peja under Haxhi Zeka, Najdeni’s work influenced assemblies held in Debar under the leadership of his friends and students, Selim Rusi and Ohri.

In 1903, he met in Tripoli with Kemal, Refik Toptani, and Rexhep Pasha Mati. He had contracted turberculosis by then, and his friends referred him to a doctor in Rome, but the doctor’s prognosis was poor, and so Najdeni returned to his hometown, where he died.
