= Debar =

Debar Дебaр (Macedonian) Dibër/Dibra (Albanian)
- Town
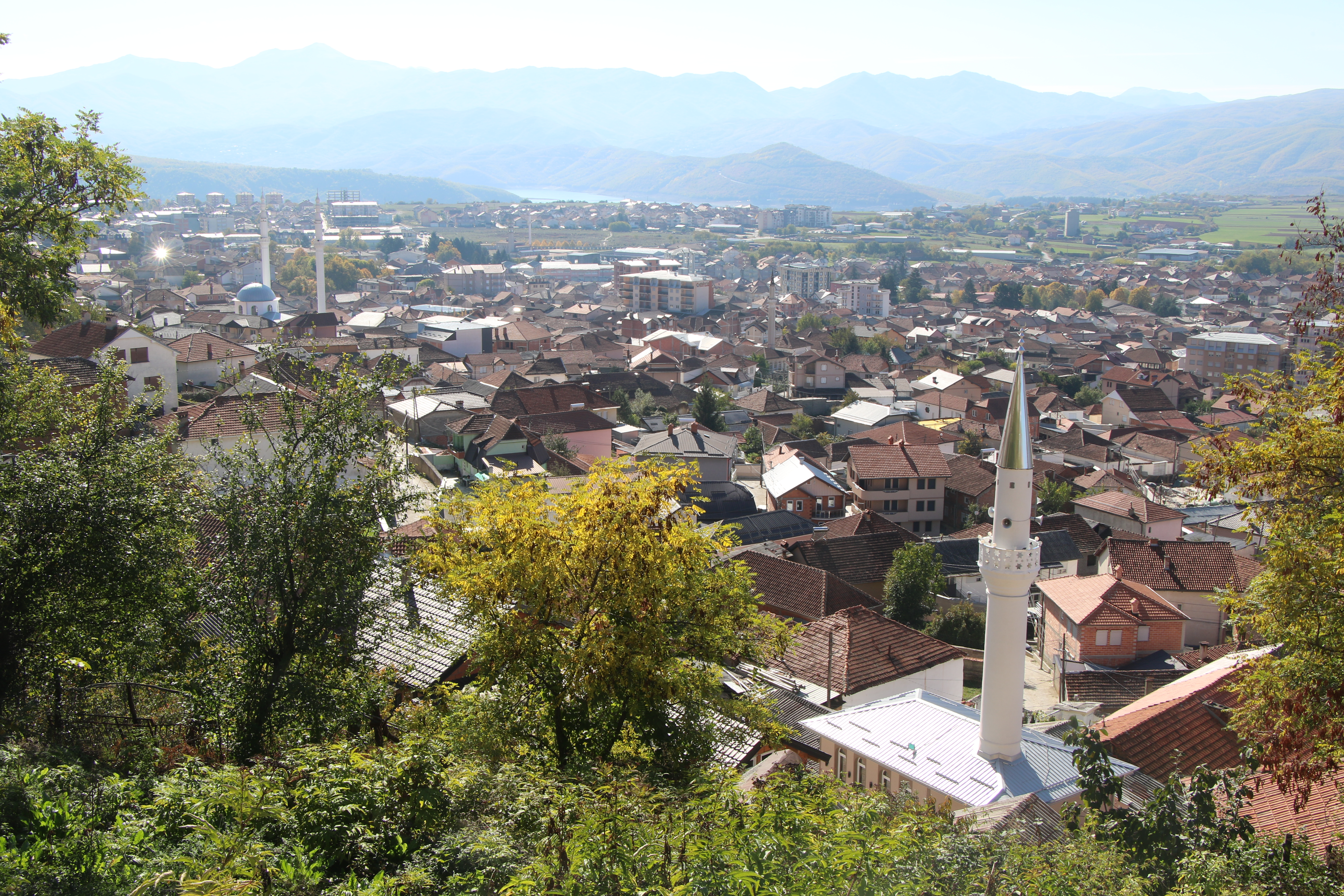
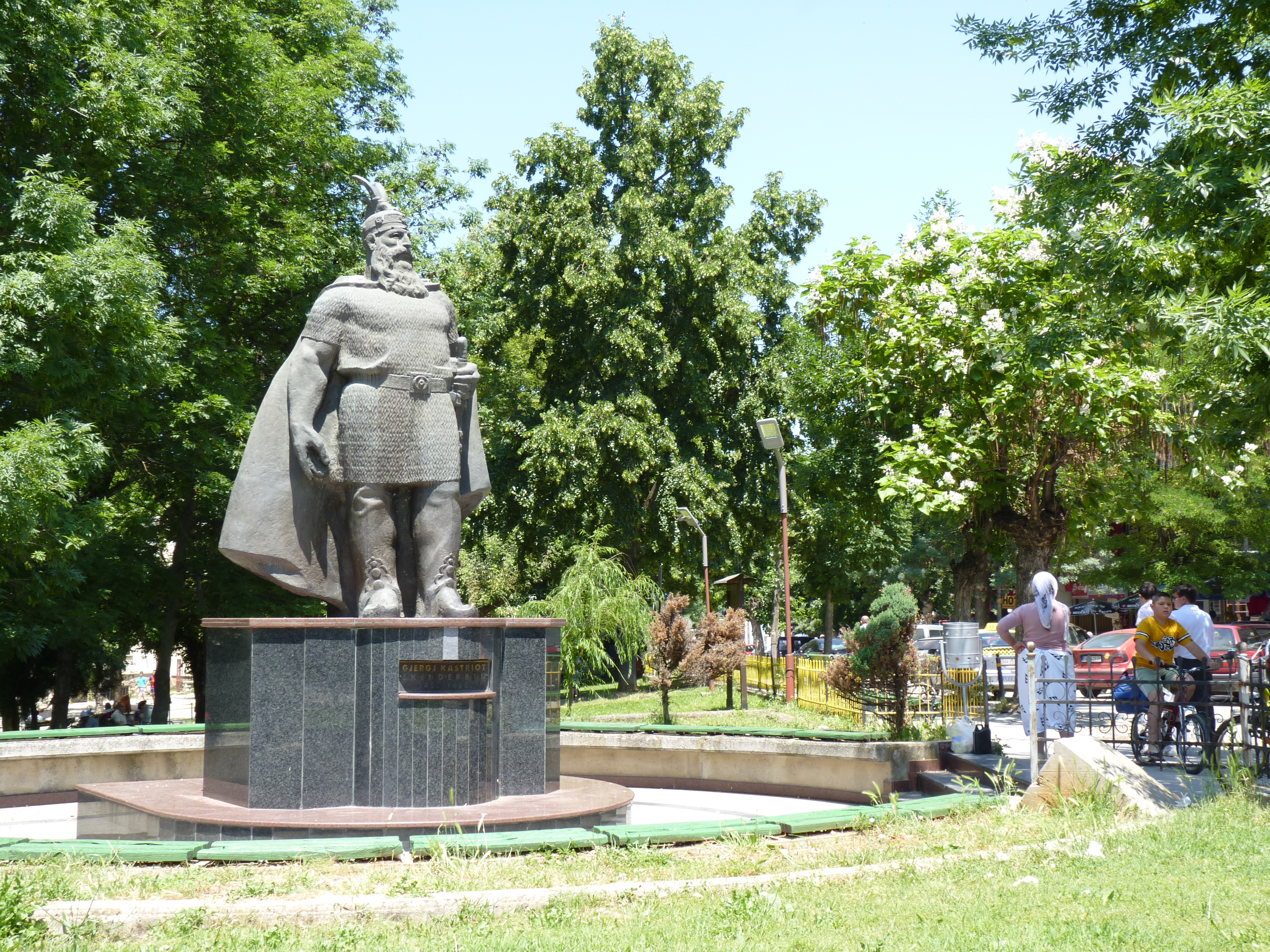
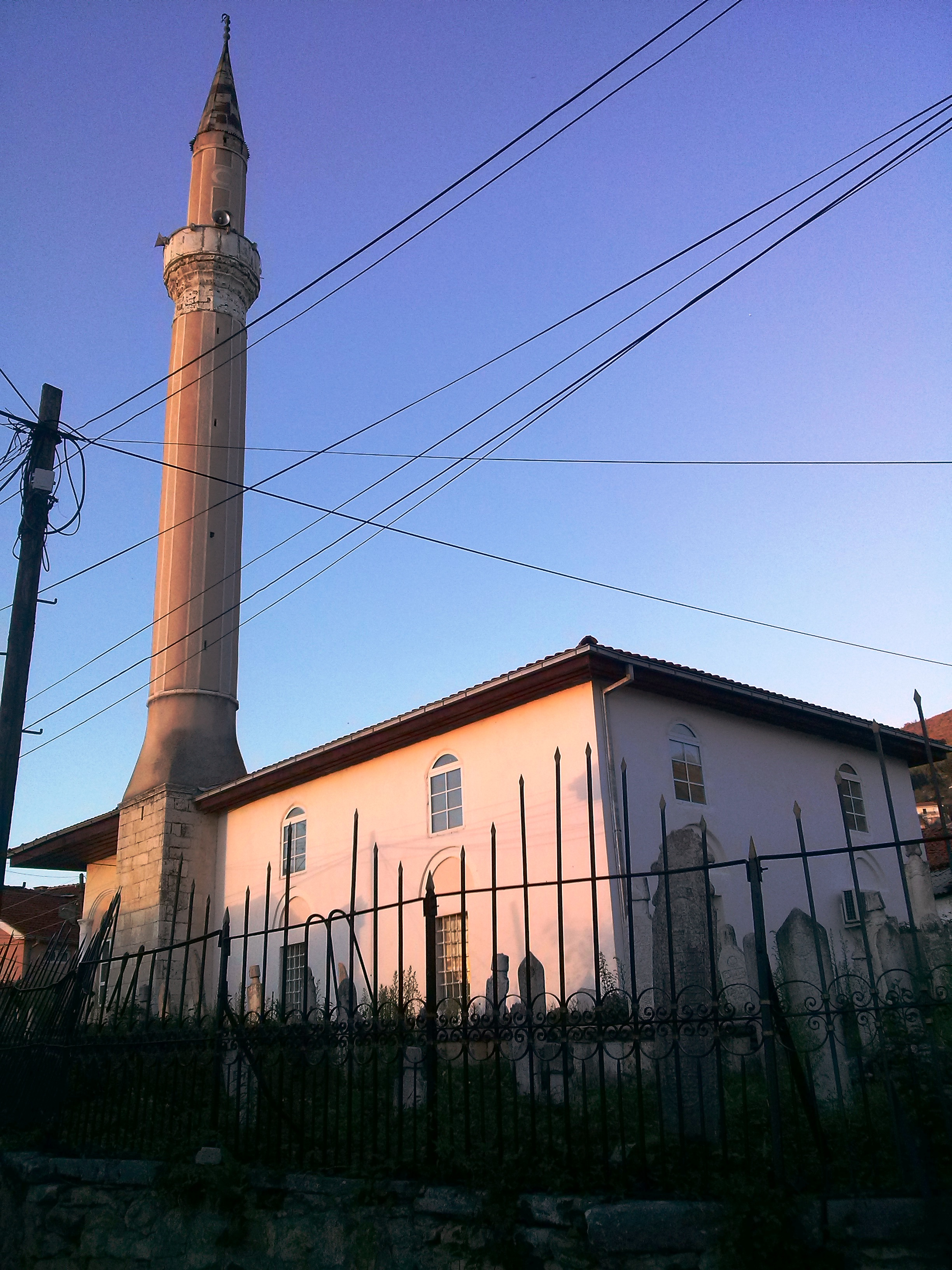
- View over Debar Skanderbeg Monument Inkjar Mosque View of Debar

- Flag Seal

- Location within North Macedonia
- Coordinates: 41°31′N 20°32′E
- Country: North Macedonia
- Region: Southwestern
- Municipality: Debar

Government
  - Mayor: Fisnik Mela (VLEN)

Population (2021)
  - Total: 11,735
- Demonym(s): Albanian: Dibran (m), Dibrane (f)
- Time zone: UTC+1 (CET)
  - Summer (DST): UTC+2 (CEST)
- Postal code: 1250
- Vehicle registration: DB
- Climate: Cfb
- Website: www.dibra.gov.mk

Debar (Macedonian: Дебaр [ˈdɛbar]; Albanian: Dibër, Albanian definite form: Dibra or Dibra e Madhe) is a city in the western part of North Macedonia, near the border with Albania, off the road from Struga to Gostivar. It is the seat of Debar Municipality. Debar has an ethnic Albanian majority and is North Macedonia's only city where ethnic Macedonians do not rank first or second demographically. The official languages are Macedonian and Albanian.

== Name ==
The name of the city in Macedonian is Debar (Дебар). In Albanian; Dibër/Dibra or Dibra e Madhe (meaning "Great Dibra", in contrast to the other Dibër in Albania). In Serbian Debar (Дебар), in Bulgarian Debǎr (Дебър), in Turkish Debre or Debre-i Bala, in Greek, Dívrē (Δίβρη) or Dívra (Δίβρα), in Ancient Greek Dēvoros, Δήβορος and in Roman times as Deborus.

== Geography ==
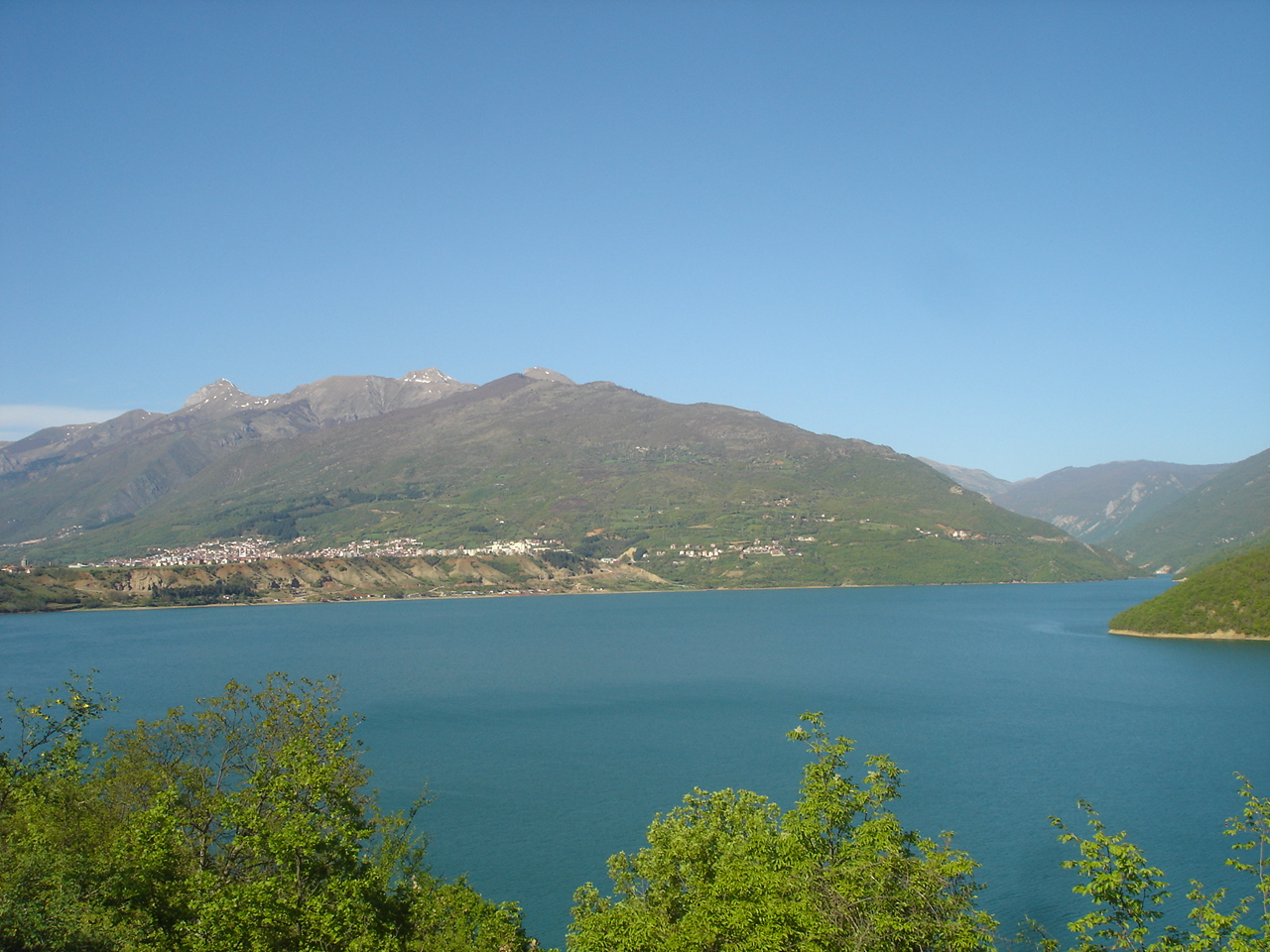
Lake Debar

Debar is surrounded by the Dešat, Stogovo, Jablanica and Bistra mountains.

It is located 625 meters above sea level, next to Lake Debar, the Black Drin River and its smaller break-off river, Radika.

== History ==
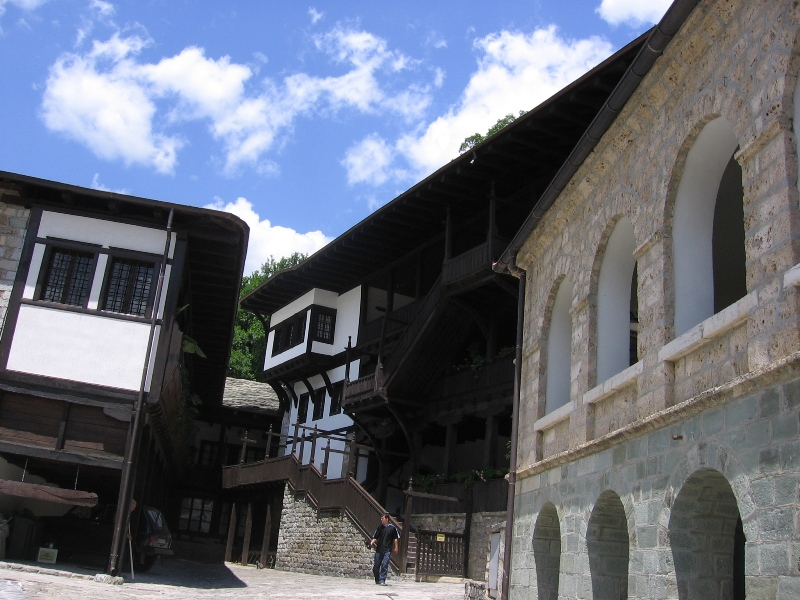
Saint Jovan Bigorski Monastery near Debar.

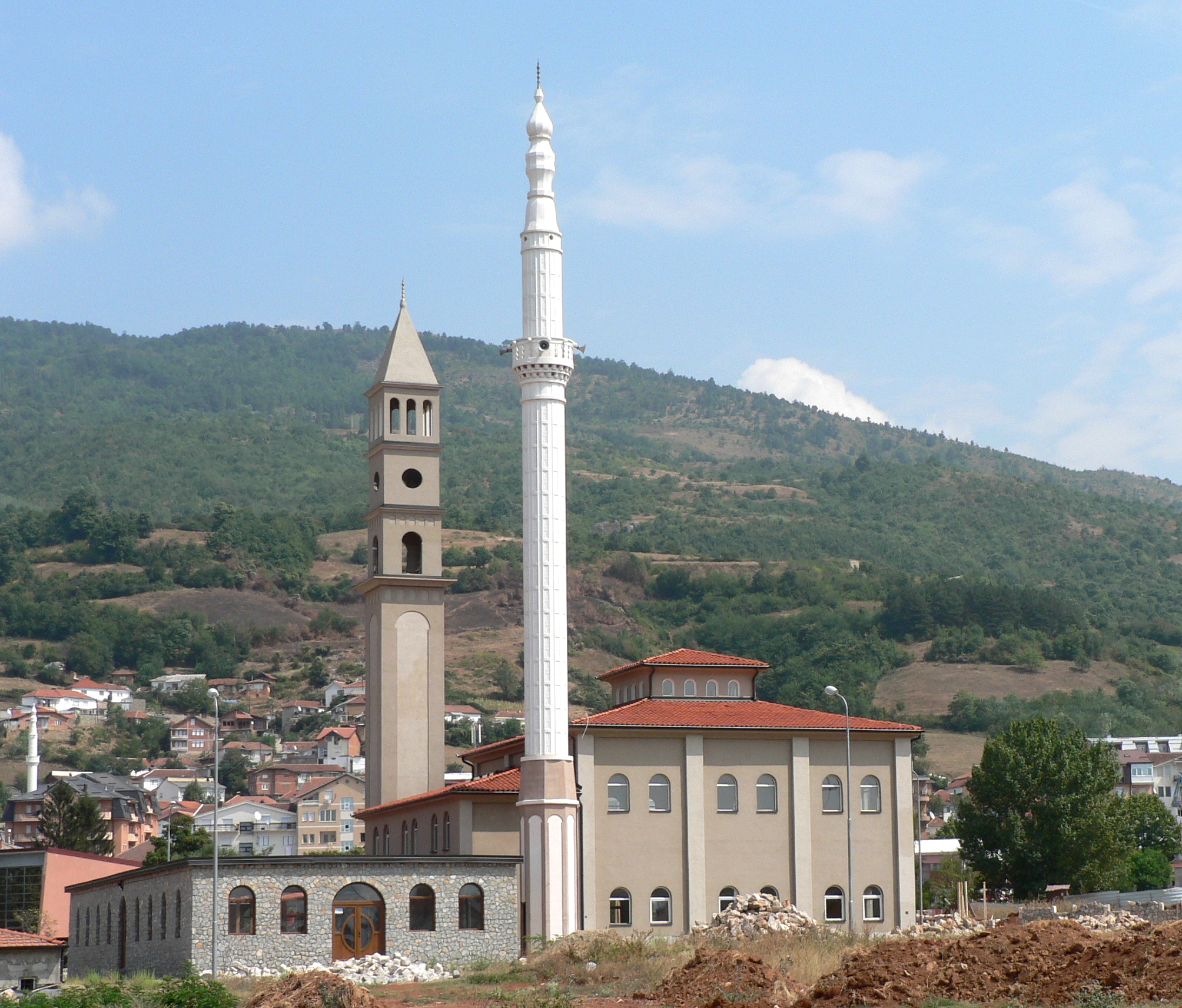
The mosque of Debar.

The Byzantine emperor Basil II knew of its existence, historian Anna Komnena recorded the name as Devré in the Alexiad, and Feliks Petančić referred to it as Dibri in 1502.

During the period from the 12th, to early 14th century, Debar was ruled by the Albanian noble Gropa family. In the latter half of the 14th century until the first half of the 15th century it was ruled by the Principality of Kastrioti, an Albanian medieval principality ruled by the Kastrioti noble family and later from 1443 by the Albanian state, League of Lezhë. Debar fell under the rule of the Ottoman Empire when local ruler Gjon Kastrioti died shortly after his four children were taken hostage.

It was conquered by the Ottomans in 1395 and subsequently became the seat of the Sanjak of Dibra.

In 1440 Skanderbeg was appointed as its sanjakbey. Later the city would be governed by Moisi Golemi. Debar was liberated in 1443 by Skanderbeg and 300 Albanian soldiers who had defected from the Ottoman army at the Battle of Niš. The local population rallied towards Skanderbeg and blocked the roads leading to the town.

Later during Skanderbeg's rebellion, the Dibër region was the borderline between the Ottomans and the League of Lezhë led by Skanderbeg and became an area of continuous conflict. There were two major battles near Debar, on 29 June 1444 The Battle of Torvioll and on 27 September 1446 The Battle of Otonetë both ending with the defeat of the Ottoman armies and Albanian victories.

An Ottoman army division was also stationed within the town.

It was first a sanjak centre in Scutari Vilayet before 1877, and afterwards in Manastir Vilayet between 1877 and 1912 as Debre or Debre-i Bala ("Upper Debre" in Ottoman Turkish, as contrasted with Debre-i Zir, which was Peshkopi's Turkish name).

Debar was significantly involved in the national Albanian movement and on 1 November 1878 the Albanian leaders of the city participated in founding the League of Prizren.

In 1907 the Congress of Dibra was held in the town, which made Albanian an official language within the Ottoman Empire. The congress allowed that Albanian be taught in schools legally for the first time within the Empire.

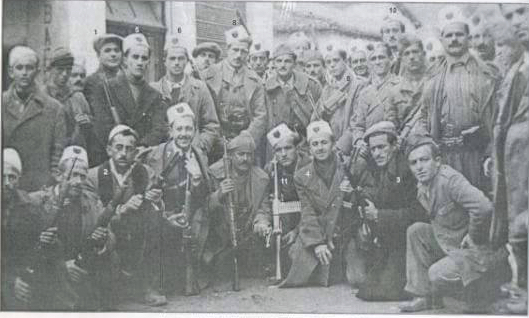
Balli Kombëtar forces in Debar

Following the capture of the town of Debar by Serbia, many of its Albanian inhabitants fled to Turkey, the rest went to Tirana. Of those that ended up in Istanbul, some of their number migrated to Albania, mainly to Tirana where the Dibran community formed an important segment of the capital city's population from 1920 onward and for some years thereafter.

Between 1912 and 1921, Albanians led 5 victorius uprisings against the Serbian Kingdom and Yugoslavia

During the Great Retreat of the Serbian forces into Albania from Debar Ali Pustina, an Albanian revolutionary from the city who was fighting against the Serbs was killed in 1915 by the retreating Serbian forces.

It was occupied by Kingdom of Bulgaria between 1915 and 1918.

From 1929 to 1941, Debar was part of the Vardar Banovina of the Kingdom of Yugoslavia.

Debar was annexed, along with most of Western North Macedonia, into the Italian-controlled Kingdom of Albania on 17 April 1941, following the Axis invasion of Yugoslavia during the Second World War. Albania was officially a protectorate of Italy and therefore public administration duties were passed to Albanian authorities. Albanian language schools, radio stations and newspapers were established in Debar. When Italy capitulated in September 1943, Debar passed into German hands. In 1944, after a two-month struggle for the city between the communist Albanian National Liberation Front and German forces holding the city, including the SS Skanderbeg division, the communists led by Haxhi Lleshi finally secured Debar on 30 August 1944.

After the cessation of hostilities with the end of WW2 and the establishment of communism in both Albania and Yugoslavia, Debar passed back into Yugoslav hands.

== Population ==
In the late Ottoman period, Debre (Debar) was a town with 20,000 inhabitants, 420 shops, 9 mosques, 10 madrasas, 5 tekkes, 11 government run primary schools, 1 secondary school, 3 Christian primary schools and 1 church. In the early 19th century, when Debar rebelled against the Turkish Sultan, the French traveller, publicist, and scientist Ami Boue observed that Debar had 64 shops and 4,200 residents.

According to the statistics of the Bulgarian ethnographer Vasil Kanchov in 1900 the population of Debar was 15,500 consisting of 10,500 Albanians, 4,500 Bulgarians, and 500 Romani.

According to the last census data from 2021, the city of Debar has a population of 11,735, made up of

- 8,194 (69.8%) Albanians,
- 1,140 (9.7%) Roma,
- 911 (7.8%) Turks,
- 419 (3.6%) Macedonians, and
- 146 (1.2%) others.

City of Debar population according to ethnic group 1948-2021
Ethnic group	census 1948		census 1953		census 1961		census 1971		census 1981		census 1994		census 2002		census 2021	
Ethnic group	Number	%	Number	%	Number	%	Number	%	Number	%	Number	%	Number	%	Number	%
Albanians	..	..	4,122	74.7	4,507	71.3	6,681	75.7	8,625	70.7	9,400	70.5	10,768	74.0	8,194	69.8
Turks	..	..	53	1.0	195	3.1	367	4.2	573	4.7	1,175	8.8	1,415	9.7	911	7.8
Roma	..	..	83	1.5	0	0.0	0	0.0	1,030	8.5	1,103	8.3	1,079	7.4	1,140	9.7
Macedonians	..	..	1,110	20.1	1,009	16.0	1,276	14.5	1,106	9.1	1,431	10.7	1,054	7.3	419	3.6
Vlachs	..	..	2	0.0	0	0.0	0	0.0	0	0.0	1	0.0	2	0.0	2	0.0
Serbs	..	..	87	1.6	57	0.9	105	1.2	37	0.3	34	0.3	22	0.2	4	0.0
Bosniaks	..	..	0	0.0	0	0.0	0	0.0	0	0.0	0	0.0	2	0.0	5	0.0
Others	..	..	63	1.2	555	8.8	394	4.5	830	6.8	196	1.5	219	1.5	146	1.2
Persons for whom data are taken from administrative sources															914	7.8
Total	4,698		5,520		6,323		8,823		12,201		13,340		14,561		11,735	

== Culture ==
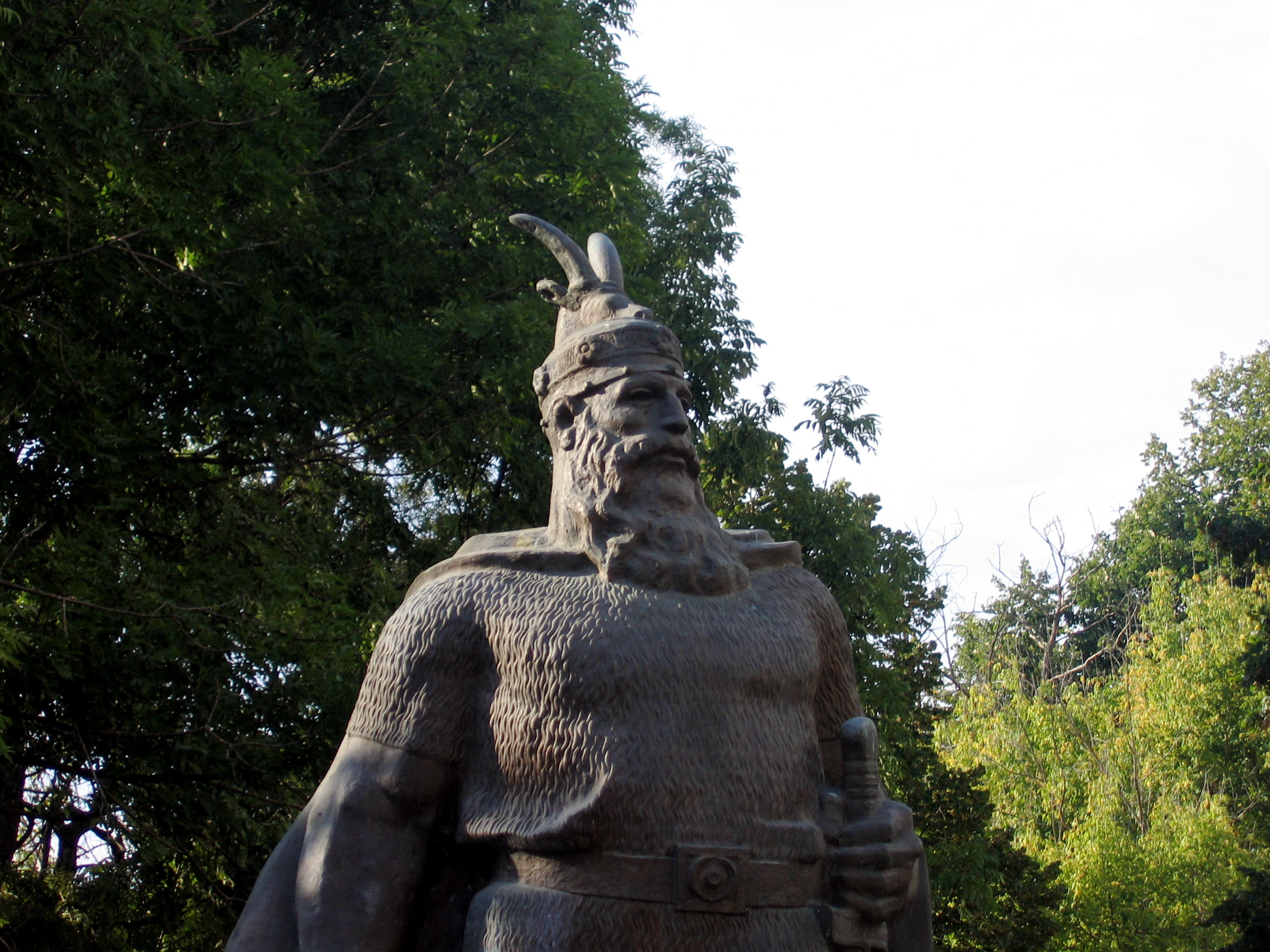
Statue of Skanderbeg in Debar

Some of the best craftsman, woodcarving masters and builders came from the Debar region and were recognized for their skills in creating detailed and impressive woodcarvings, painting beautiful icons and building unique architecture. In fact, Debar was one of the then famous three woodcarving schools in the region, the other two being Samokov and Bansko. Their work can be seen in many churches and cultural buildings throughout the Balkan Peninsula. The Mijak School of woodcarving became noted for its artistic excellence, and an example that can be seen today by tourists is the iconostasis in the nearby Monastery of Saint Jovan Bigorski, near the town of Debar. The monastery was rebuilt in the 19th century and is situated on the slopes of Mount Bistra, above the banks of the River Radika. The monastery was built on the remains of an older church dating from 1021.

Another important religious monument is the monastery of Saint Gjorgi in the village of Rajcica in the immediate vicinity of Debar. The monastery was recently built.

Grigor Parlichev was given the title Second Homer in 1860 in Athens for his poem The Serdar. Based on a folk poem, it deals with the exploits and heroic death of Kuzman Kapidan, a famous hero and protector of Christian people in the Debar region in their struggle with bandits.

Some of the oldest and richest Albanian epics still exist in the Debar regions and are part of the Albanian mythological heritage.

Debar is also known for its pizza consumption. As of 2018, Debar had one pizzeria for every 3,000 residents, and emigrants from the town had opened approximately 50 pizza restaurants in the United States.

== Sports ==
Local football club Korabi plays in the Macedonian Second League (West Division).

== International relations ==
=== Partner towns ===
Partner towns of Debar:

- Vidin, Bulgaria
- Ifs, France. Since 1992

== Notable people ==
- Gjon Kastrioti – Father of Skanderbeg
- Said Najdeni – Albanian activist, scholar
- Nexhat Agolli – Albanian politician and deputy president of ASNOM
- Qemal Agolli — Communist activist and a delegate to the First Session of ASNOM
- Eqrem Basha – Albanian writer
- Gëzim Ostreni – Former NLA commander
- Jusuf Vojnika (1938–2002) – surgeon, primarius, founder and first head of the Surgical Department in Debar, and long-time director of the Debar Medical Center.
- Abdurraman Dibra – Albanian politician, minister in Ahmet Zogu's rule
- Fuat Dibra – Albanian politician, minister and senior official of Balli Kombëtar
- Iljaz Pasha Dibra – Albanian politician, and Ottoman pasha
- Fiqri Dine – Albanian politician, former prime minister of Albania
- Akif Erdemgil – Turkish military officer in the Ottoman and Turkish armies
- Moisi Golemi – General in Skenderbeg's army
- John of Debar – Bulgarian Orthodox clergyman, first head of the Ohrid Archbishopric and founder of the Saint Jovan Bigorski Monastery
- Georgi Gramatik – Medieval priest, grammarian and an author of the Bitola triodion
- Milan Pančevski – Former Macedonian and Yugoslav high-ranking communist official, last president of the League of Communists of Yugoslavia
- Janko Obočki – Former Macedonian surgeon, neurosurgeon, primarius and Minister of Health of Yugoslavia and SR Macedonia
- Kiril Žernovski – Macedonian civil engineer and professor in UKIM at the Faculty of Civil Engineering in Skopje, delegate to the Second Session of ASNOM
- Abdul Vojnika (1928-1980) – former president of the Municipal Assembly of Debar and industrial executive. He was also a member of the Council for Spatial Planning of the Socialist Republic of Macedonia and was involved in the civic and urban development of Debar
- Goce Ljubinovski – Macedonian activist and president of the non-governmental organization "Center for Sustainable Community Development – Debar"
- Ivan Agovski – Bulgarian communist
- Spase Kunovski — Macedonian painter, the most significant representative of surrealism and metaphysical painting in Macedonia
- Vasil Kunoski – Macedonian poet
- Ruža Panoska – Macedonian linguist, methodologist, professor at the Department of Macedonian Language and South Slavic Languages at the Faculty of Philology "Blaže Koneski" in Skopje
- Ivan Ivanovski – Macedonian poet, children's writer, theater critic
- Masar Kodra — Albanian historian, research associate, university professor.
- Lutvi Rusi — Albanian journalist, writer and translator from and into Albanian
- Ivan Božinov – Bulgarian writer, poet and Mayor of Debar during Bulgarian occupation of Serbia (World War I)
- Šterjo Mihajlov – Bulgarian revolutionary, participant in the Razlovci uprising and voivode in the Kresna uprising
- Isaija Mažovski – Mijak painter and activist
- Sefedin Pustina – Albanian revolutionary, one of the leaders of the Ohrid–Debar Uprising
- Ali Pustina – Albanian revolutionary, one of the leaders of the Ohrid–Debar Uprising
- Živko Ošavkov – Bulgarian sociologist and philosopher, one of the founders of sociology there
- Nexhmi Mehmeti – Albanian writer and journalist, one of the doyens of journalism in the Albanian language
- Vera Todorovska – journalist and correspondent for the Media Information Agency (MIA), known for her reporting from Debar and Albania.
- Jordan Danilovski – Macedonian poet, critic, essayist, novelist
- Duško Kostovski – Macedonian theater, film and television actor
- Kosta Krpač – Former Macedonian film worker, poet, editor and propagandist
- Sherif Lengu – Albanian Islamic cleric and chairman of the Muslim community of Albania
- Haki Stërmilli – Albanian writer and journalist
- Myfti Vehbi Dibra Agolli – Albanian Islamic cleric, politician and first Grand Mufti of Albania
- Selim Rusi – Albanian nationalist
- Hafëz Ismet Dibra – Albanian religious leader and writer
- Liman Kaba – Yugoslav and Albanian partisan
- Vasil Todorovski – Macedonian partisan
- Aleksandar Marinov – Macedonian revolutionary and partisan
- Blagoja Despotovski – Macedonian partisan, one of the first partisans killed during the war
- Ibe Palikuqi – Yugoslav and Albanian partisan, one of the few female partisans in Macedonia
- Faik Kurti – Albanian artist and dancer of the Albanian National Song and Dance Ensemble

== See also ==
- Debar dialect
