= Sherif Langu =

Albanian Muslim cleric (1877-1956)

Hafiz Sherif Langu
- Title: Grand Mufti

Personal life
- Born: 1877 Dibër, Ottoman Albania
- Died: 9 March 1956 (aged 78–79) Tirana, Albania
- Education: Istanbul University
- Relatives: Selim Rusi (grandfather)

Religious life
- Religion: Islam
- Denomination: Sunni
- Jurisprudence: Hanafi
- Creed: Maturidi

Muslim leader
- Post: Head of the Muslim Community of Albania
- Period in office: 1942–1945
- Predecessor: Behxhet Shapati
- Successor: Musa H. Aliu

Sherif Langu (also known as Sherif Lëngu, 1877, Debar – 9 March 1956) was an Albanian Muslim cleric who served as chairman of the Muslim Community of Albania from 1942 until 1945.

== Biography ==
Born in Debar, present-day North Macedonia (then Ottoman Empire) to an ethnic Albanian family. He and his family were Muslims and spoke Albanian in the Gheg dialect. He received his religious schooling from the local town madrasa and was later appointed imam. Langu took part in the great Assembly of Dibra on February 27, 1899. After graduating from the madrasa, he continued his high school education in Bitola and in 1904 went to study theology in Istanbul. In December 1908, he formed the "Bashkimi" club of Debar. As leader of the club's administrative council, along with other activists such as Kadri Fishta, Riza Rusi, Eqerem Cami, Ibrahim Xhidri, Abdullah Tërshana and Ibrahim Jegeni, he carried out vigorous activities for the benefit of the national cause.

His grandfather Selim Rusi, supported him in continuing his studies in Bitola and later in Istanbul, where he met other figures of the Albanian National Awakening, including Ibrahim Temo and Dervish Hima. He moved from Bitola to Debar in 1907, and formed a chapter of the Society for the Unity of the Albanian Language there in December 1908. The chapter also included Fishta, Riza Rusi, Eqerem Cami, Ibrahim Xhidri, Ramadan Camin, Abdullah Tërshana, and Ibrahim Jegeni. Langu also helped organize the Congress of Dibra on July 23, 1909. At the end of June 1910, Shevket Turgut Pasha, who derided Langu as a “Latin priest,” crushed the rebellion, but it continued underground.

Langu continued to lobby for Albanian-language schooling in the area, and the people of Debar elected him unanimously as their first official teacher of same. Carefully watching the fall of the Ottoman Empire, he joined Cami, Ismail Strazimiri, Tajar Tetova, Ramadan Cami, and Sulejman Shehu from Zerqan in taking up arms to liberate Debar. By now the leading local independence ideologue, he was elected along with Vehbi Dibra to the Assembly of Vlorë. He left Vlorë to organize resistance to the Serbian occupation of the Debar and Elbasan regions. He was arrested but freed by public agitation.

He was ushered into Elbasan by his longtime friend Aqif Pasha Elbasani and helped connect the tribes near Debar with the Provisional Government of Albania out of Vlorë. A commission consisting of Langu, Elbasani, Tetova, Ismail Haki Peqini, and Ahmet Dakli, set out to professionalize local government in Debar. They were helped by Ramadan Cami, Hoxhë Muglica, Hoxhë Kurt Ballë, and others in this effort. From 1913 to 1917, Langu acted as qadi (sharia judge) in the parts of the Dibër valley under Albanian rule. He then resettled in Debar, serving as an imam and occasional qadi there from 1920 to 1938. Reconnecting with local associates, he was surveilled by the Yugoslav government. From April 1938 to 1941, he served as chairman of the Skopje Council of Ulema, but seeing growing danger, he left for Tirana to serve as leader of the Muslim Community of Albania, promoting interreligious tolerance as the key to national unity.

In 1947, at the age of 70, he was sentenced to ten years in prison for agitation and propaganda. He was released in 1950 and died in 1956.
