= Podvis School =

Building in Podvis, North Macedonia

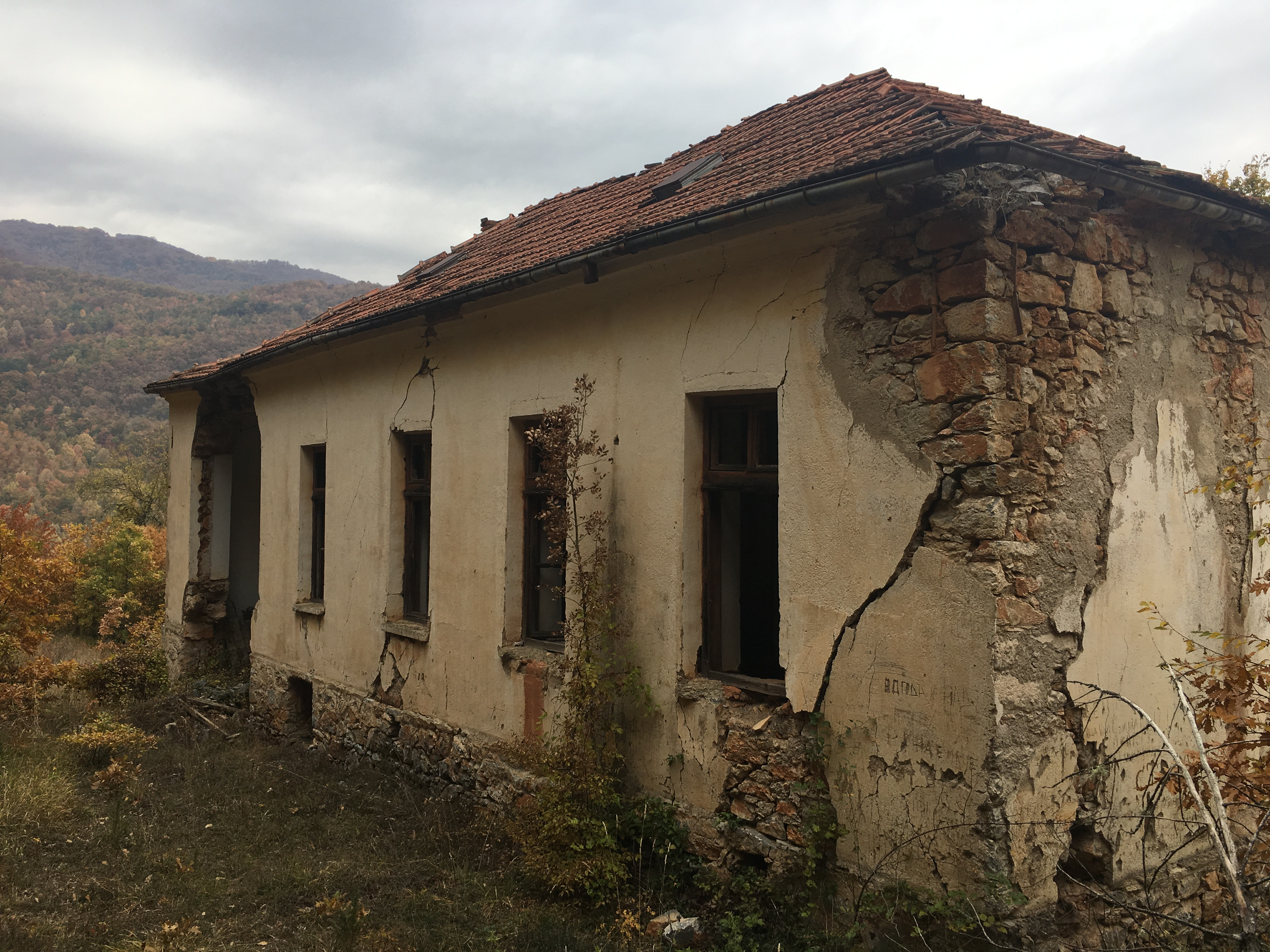
- View of the ruins of the school
- Interactive map of the Podvis School area

General information
- Type: school
- Location: Podvis, North Macedonia
- Coordinates: 41°28′08.27″N 20°53′26.06″E

Technical details
- Material: stone
- Lifts/elevators: 1

Design and construction
- Designations: Monument of Culture since December 15, 1978
- Known for: The first contemporary Macedonian language school

The Podvis School (Macedonian: Подвишко училиште, Podviško učilište), also known as Old School Building (Macedonian: Стара училишна зграда, Stara učilišna zgrada), is a building of the first primary school that held classes in contemporary Macedonian language, in the village of Podvis, North Macedonia. The building is declared as a Monument of Culture.

The old building is located in the village of Podvis, high above the last remaining houses in the village.

== Location ==
The old school in village of Podvis, where in 1943 the classes were taught in unstandardized Macedonian language, is located high above the last remaining houses in the village and the main village St. Athanasius Church. The only path to the village is a dirt road, and to the building itself there is only a hiking track and there is no clear sign showing where the school is located.

== History ==
Prior to the April War in 1941, in the school was taught in Serbian language, according to the Royal Yugoslav educational system and the forced Serbianisation. Afterwards, the village fell in the Italian occupation zone of Albania. During 1941–1944, the opening of Albanian schools was encouraged within the new borders of the then Albanian state.

Teaching in the Macedonian language, began on September 23, 1943, soon after the capitulation of Italy. Then, the Communist resistance captured temporary the village and the surrounding area. The first class was held by the teacher Vasilko Risteski Lazaroski. Afterwards, the area came under German control and the education in Macedonian ceased till 1945.

In the late 50s/early 60s, a new school building was constructed in the lower and newer parts of the village located near the Treska river and this older building lost its function as a school.

On December 15, 1978 the building was listed as Cultural heritage site.

== Current state ==
Today, the school building is in bad shape, the floor has collapsed, the wall has collapsed, there is no door, and the ceiling is crumbling. The site is overgrown with thorns and bushes, and the only way to get there is with an off-road vehicle.

The commemorative plaque, that was placed inside the building, was removed by the locals and moved to the newer part of village of Podvis, in the lowland area.

Even though the Ministry of Culture made announcements for renovating the building during 2014, that never happened.

== Gallery ==
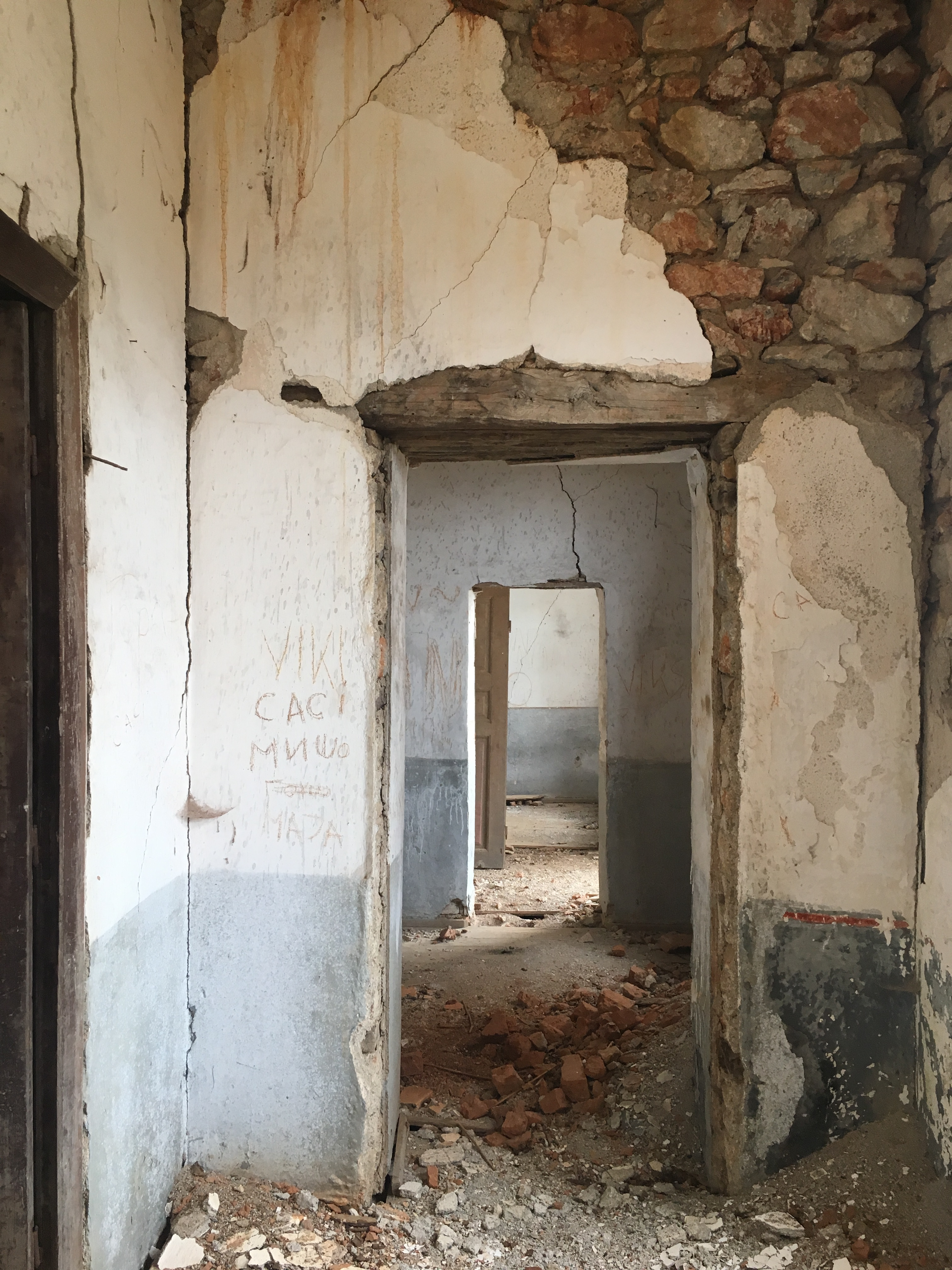
The inside of the building

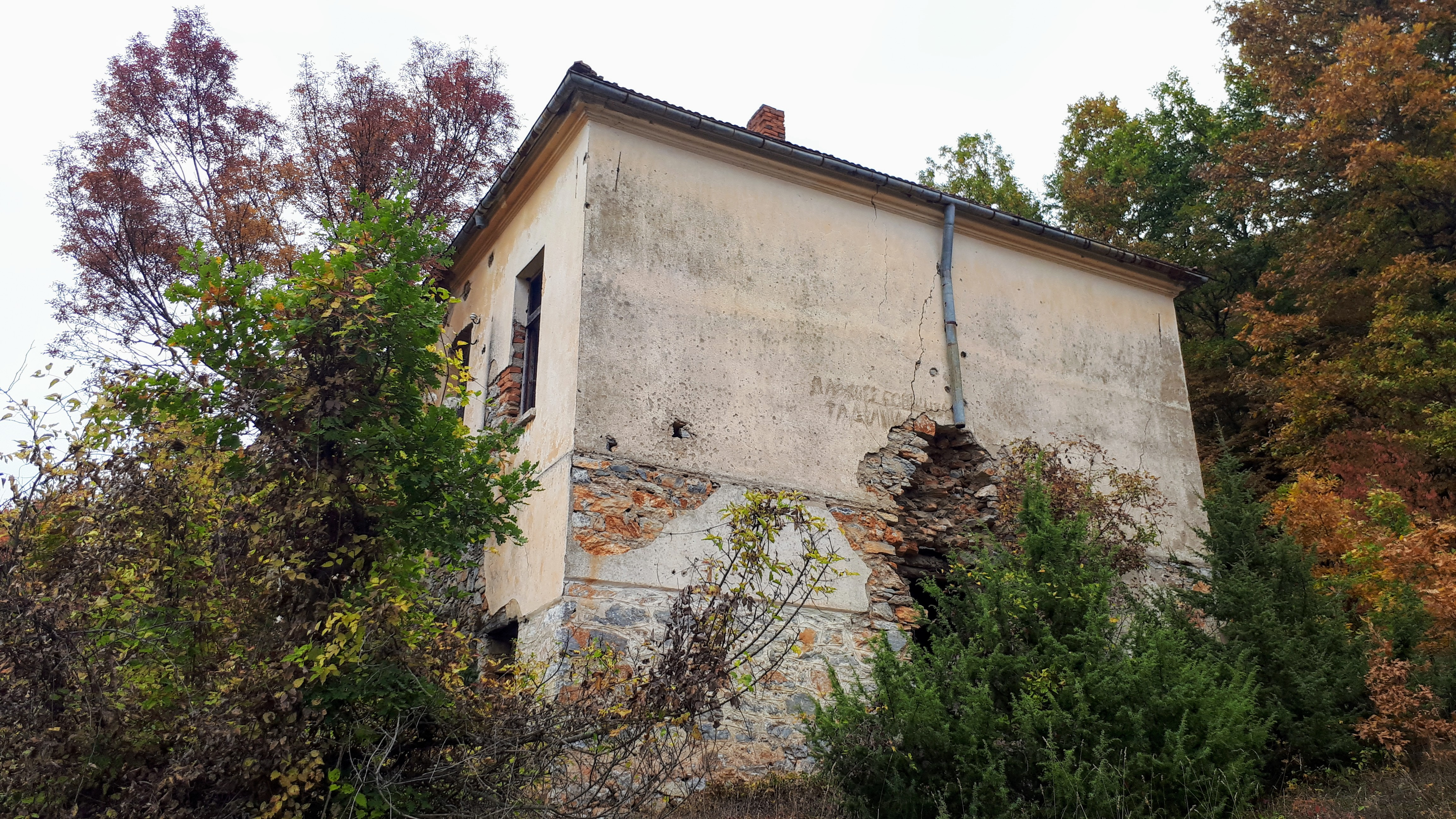
Side view of the school

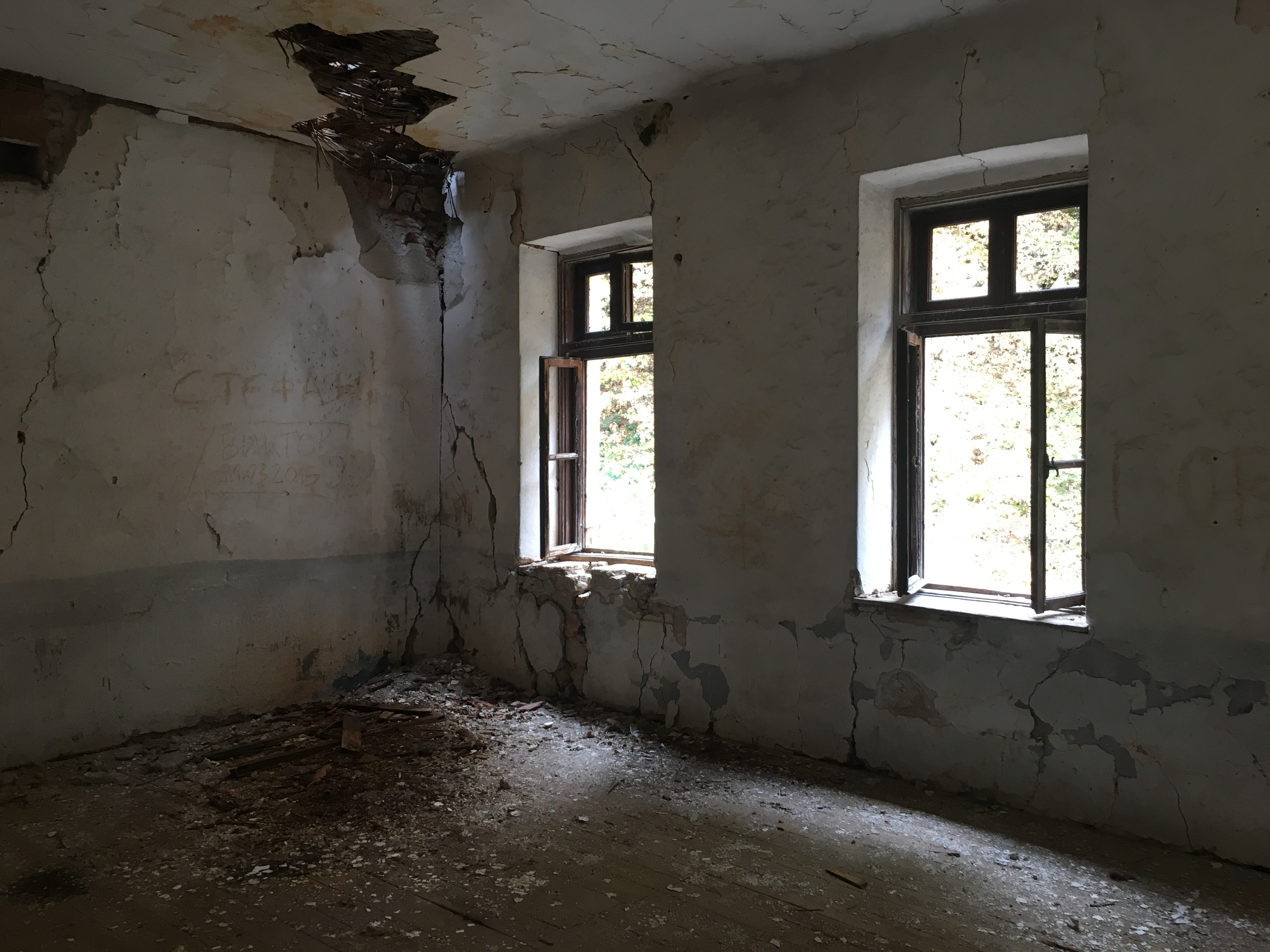
The inside of the building

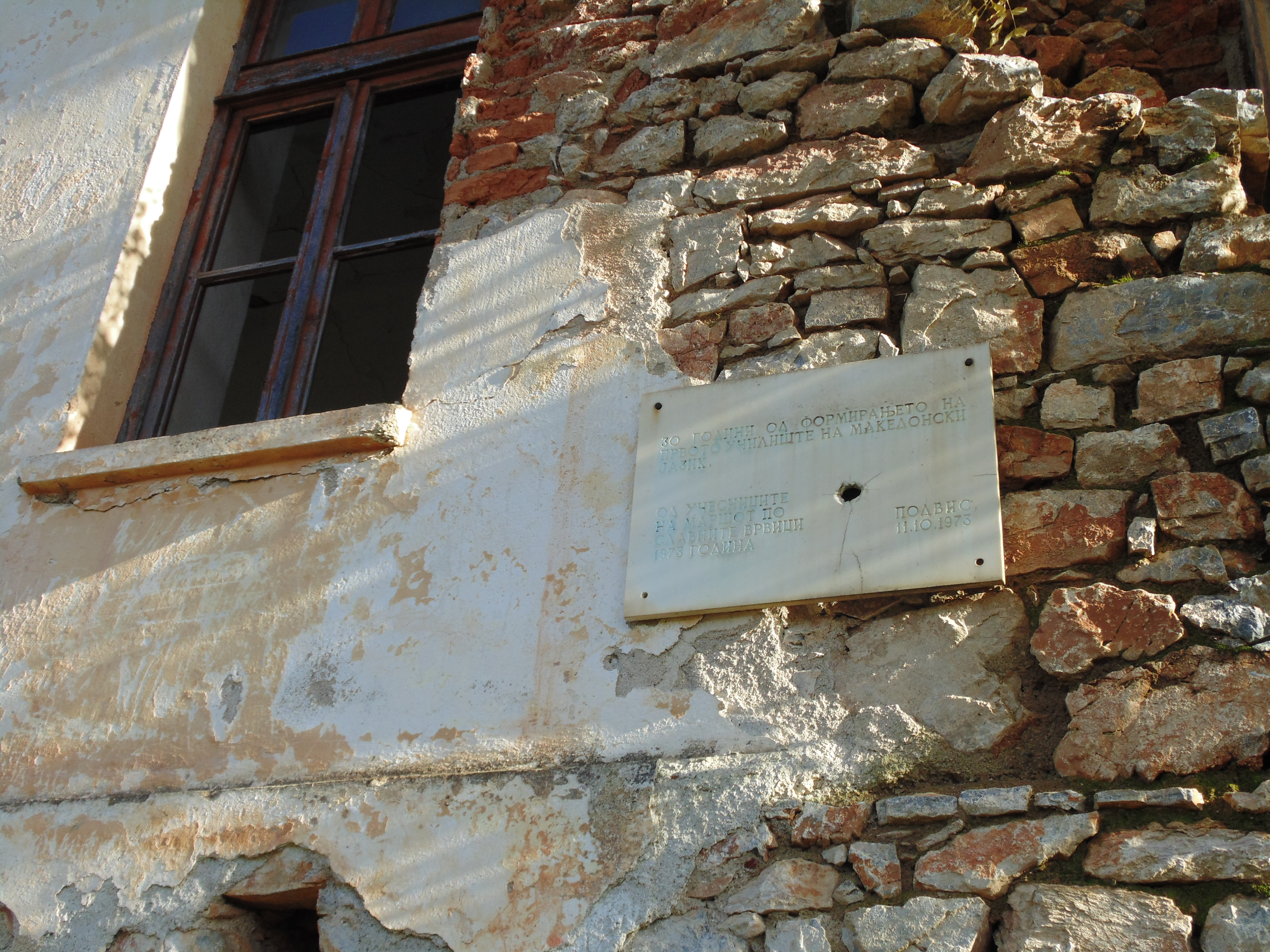
The plaque that was placed in the school
