= Stogovo =

Coordinates: 41.4833°N 20.65°E

Stogovo (Macedonian: Стогово; Albanian: Stogovë) is a mountain in the western part of North Macedonia. It has impressive peaks: Golem Rid (2278 m), Babin Srt (2242 m), Kanesh and many more higher than 2000 meters above the sea level.

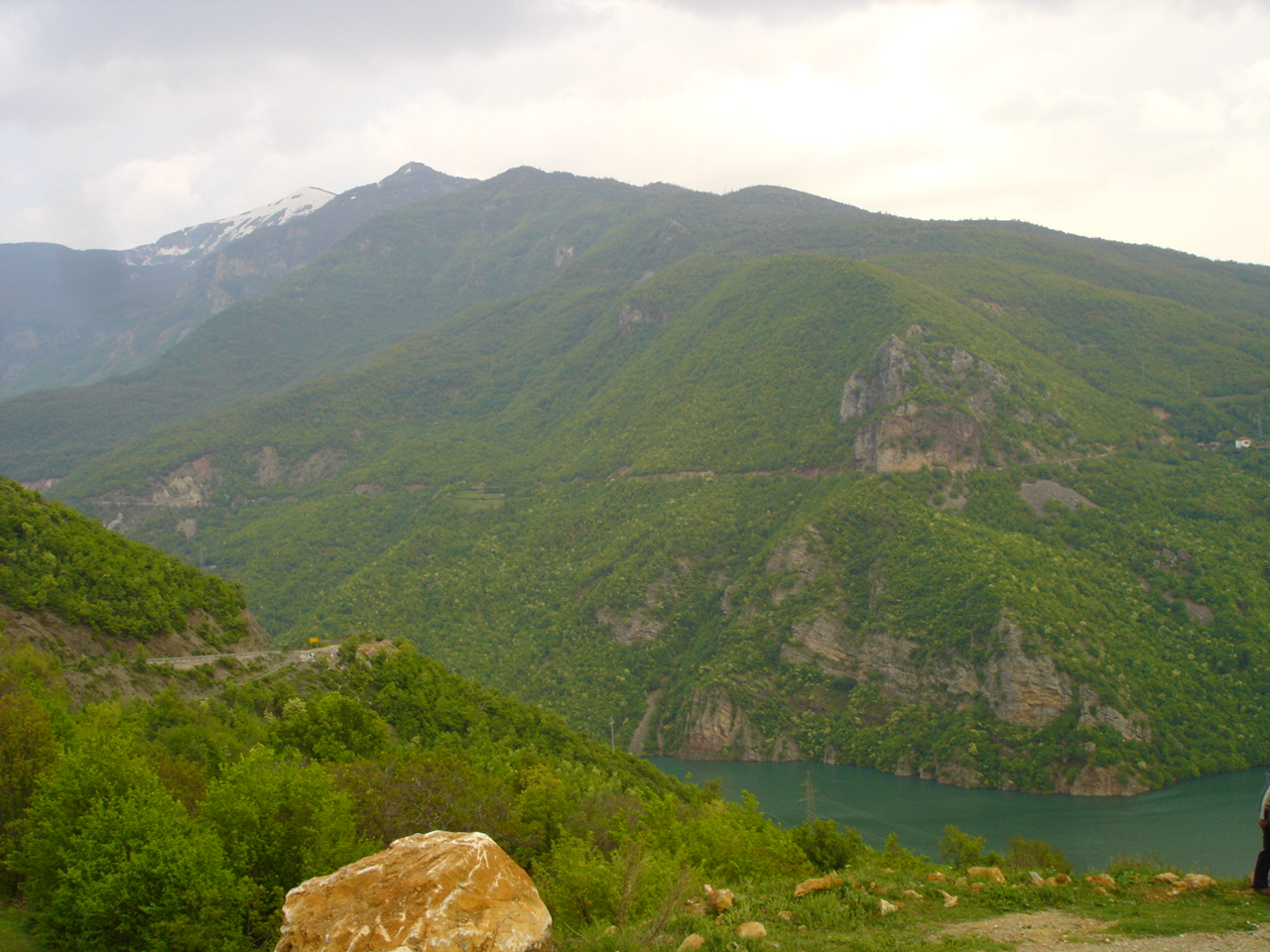
Mountain Stogovo by the Debar Lake

Mountain Stogovo can be easily reached by bus that goes from the capital of North Macedonia – Skopje to the town of Debar, at the place called "Boshkov most" (bridge). The nature is almost totally preserved on the range, because this mountain is far away from the large populated areas in the country and it is not frequently visited by mountain climbers.

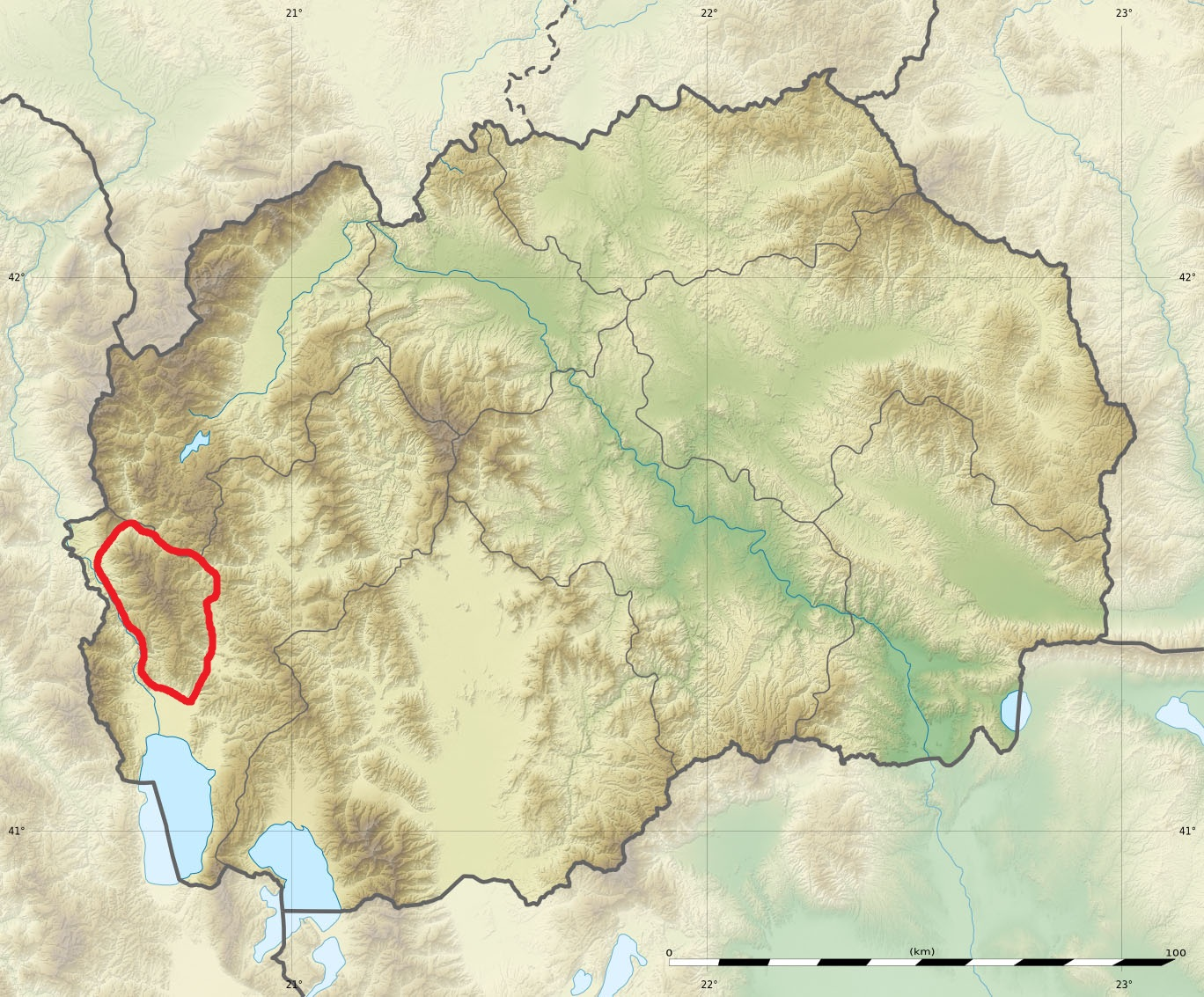
Macedonia relief Stogovo location map
