= Liman Kaba =

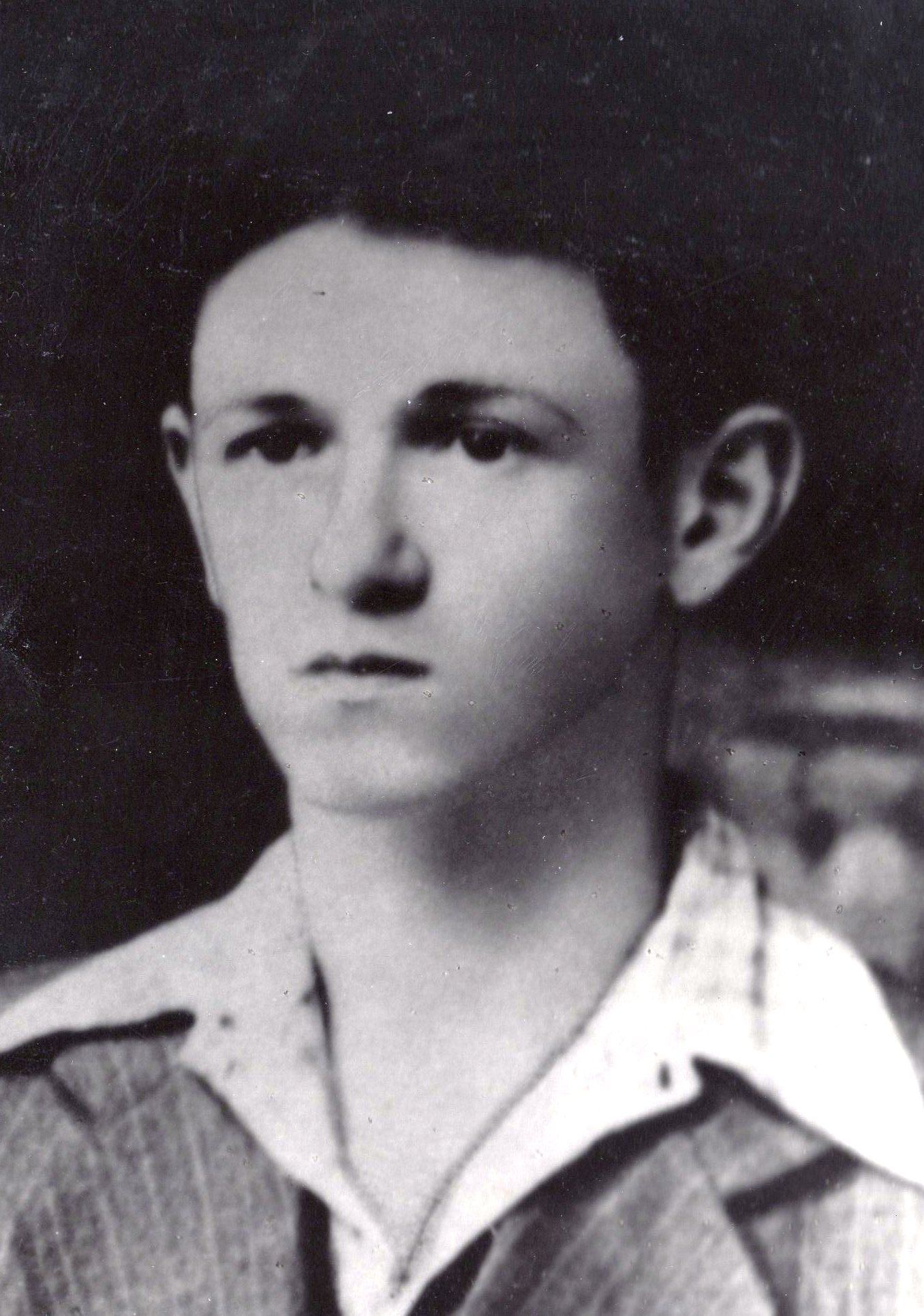
- Born: 1924; Debar, Kingdom of Serbs, Croats, and Slovenes
- Died: 1945; Banova Jaruga, Yugoslavia
- Allegiance: Yugoslav Partisans, Albanian Partisans
- Battles / wars: Second Balkan War: Syrmian Front

Liman Kaba (Albanian: Liman Kaba, Serbian: Лиман Каба) was a Yugoslav partisan and a member of the communist resistance in Vardar Macedonia.

== Biography ==
An Albanian, Kaba was born in 1924 in the town of Debar. During his studies at a gymnasium in Pristina, he was caught in Aufmarsch 25. There, he began organizing communist resistance, which led to his arrest twice in the following year of 1942. He managed to escape from prison and returned to his hometown. Members of the Communist Party of Yugoslavia (CPY) gathered at his house for a meeting and Kuzman Josifovski founded the Local Committee of the CPY for Debar there. In February 1943, he moved to Tirana and became a partisan in the Albanian National Liberation Partisan Detachment Dajti. With the detachment, he traveled the area of Debar and Peshkopia. After Italy's capitulation on November 8, 1943, he became the deputy political commissar of a platoon under the command of the city. On August 26, 1944, he joined the newly formed Fourth Macedonian Albanian Brigade. In 1944, he became a member of the CPY. He died in 1945 on the Srem Front as a deputy political commissar of a battalion within the Fifteenth Corps of the People's Liberation Army of Yugoslavia. He was declared a national hero of Yugoslavia on October 8, 1953.
