= Debar Lake =

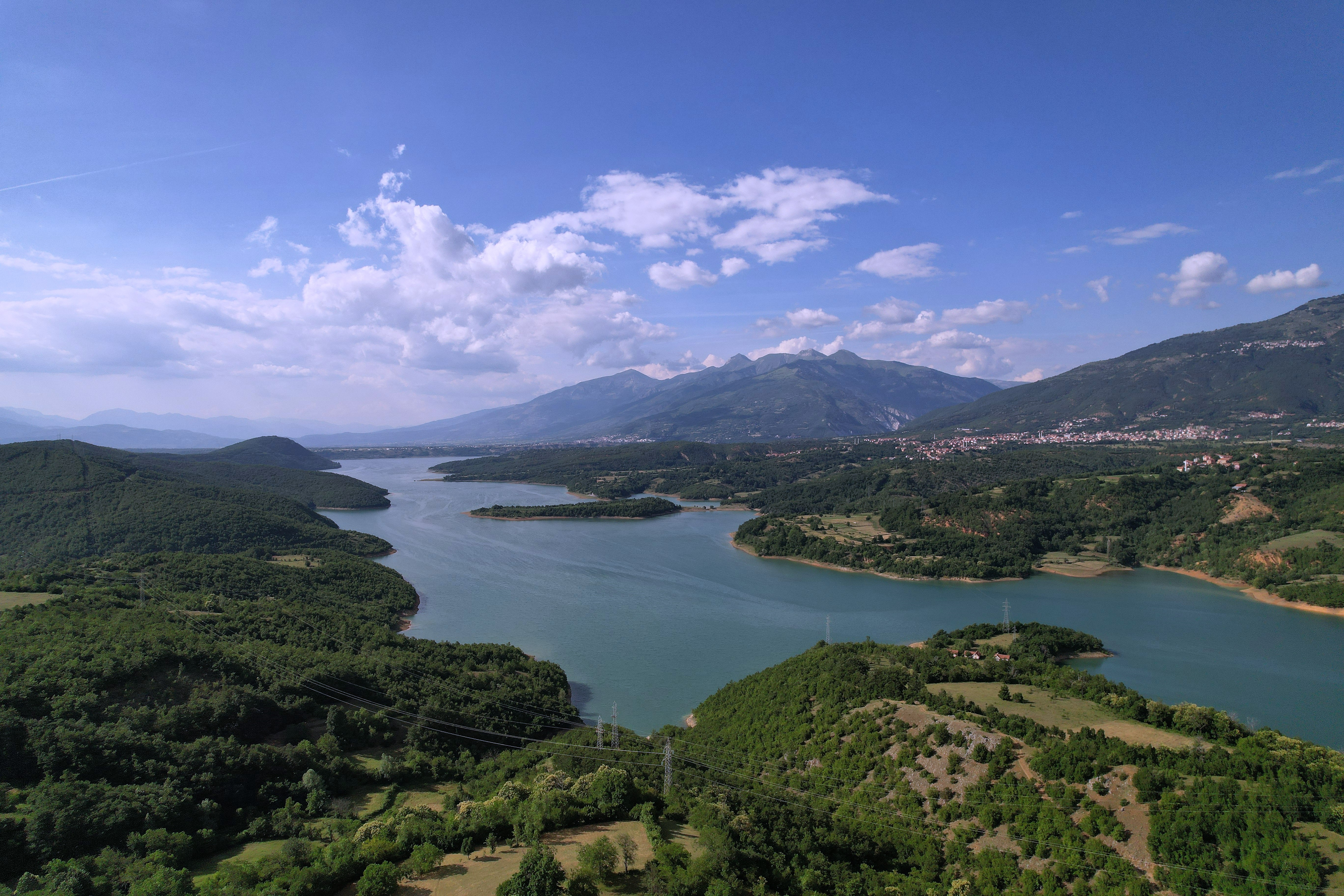
- Airview of the lake

- Location within North Macedonia
- Interactive map of Debar Lake
- Location: North Macedonia
- Coordinates: 41°29′N 20°31′E
- Type: artificial lake
- Surface area: 13.2 km^{2} (1,320 ha)
- Max. depth: 92 m (302 ft)
- Surface elevation: 580 m (1,900 ft)

Debar Lake (Macedonian: Дебарско Езеро, romanized: Debarsko Ezero; Albanian: Liqeni i Dibrës) is an artificial lake in the western portion of North Macedonia near the town of Debar after which it is named. A dam at Špilje blocks the Black Drin, the second longest river in the country.

Lake Debar has a surface area of 13.2 square kilometres (1,320 ha) and is among the largest lakes in North Macedonia. It is 92 metres (302 ft) deep and sits at an altitude of 580 metres above the Adriatic. It was created between 1966 and 1968, after the existing dam at Špilje was raised to 102 metres (335 ft).

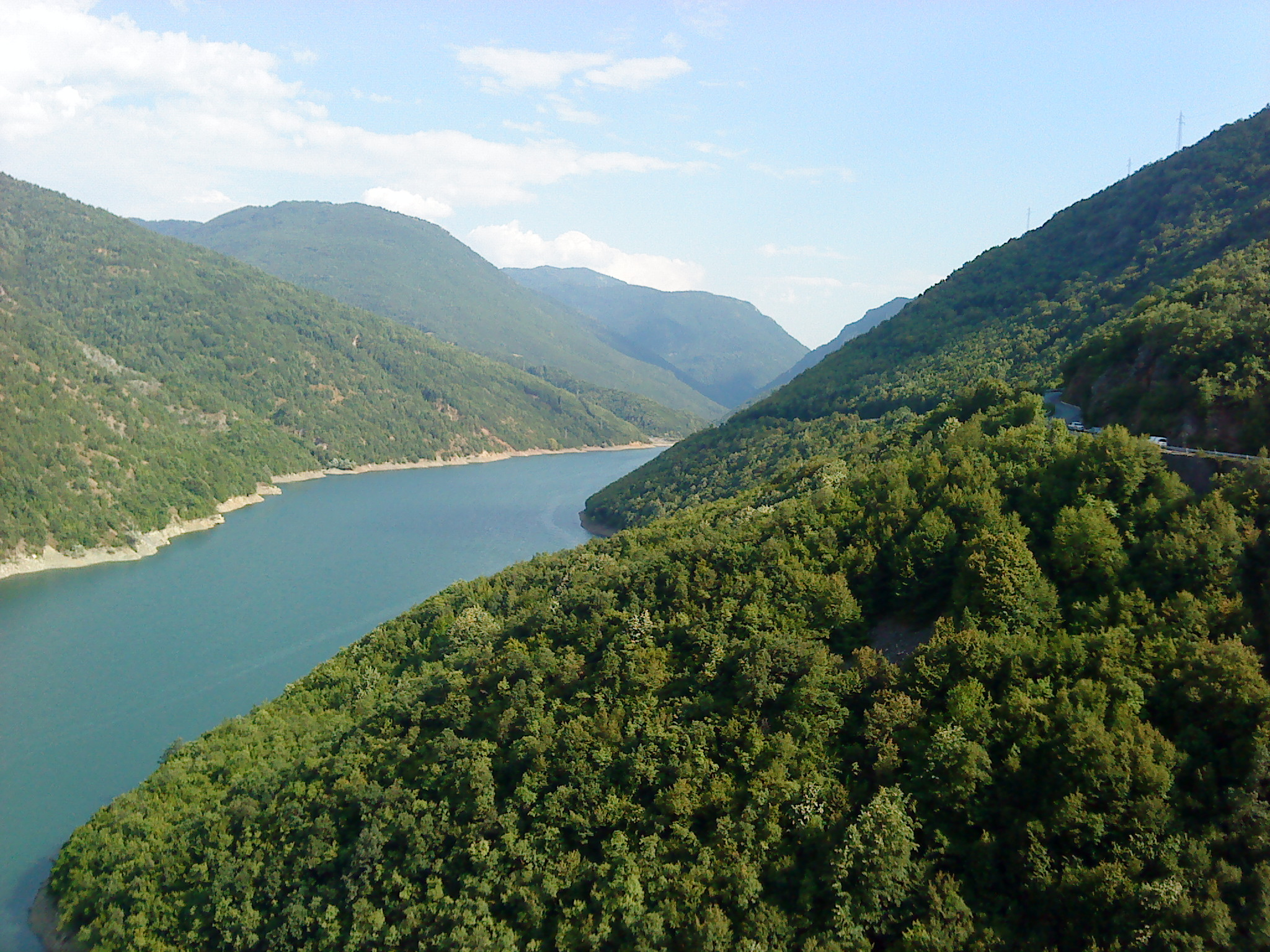
Southern outlet of the lake

== Gallery ==
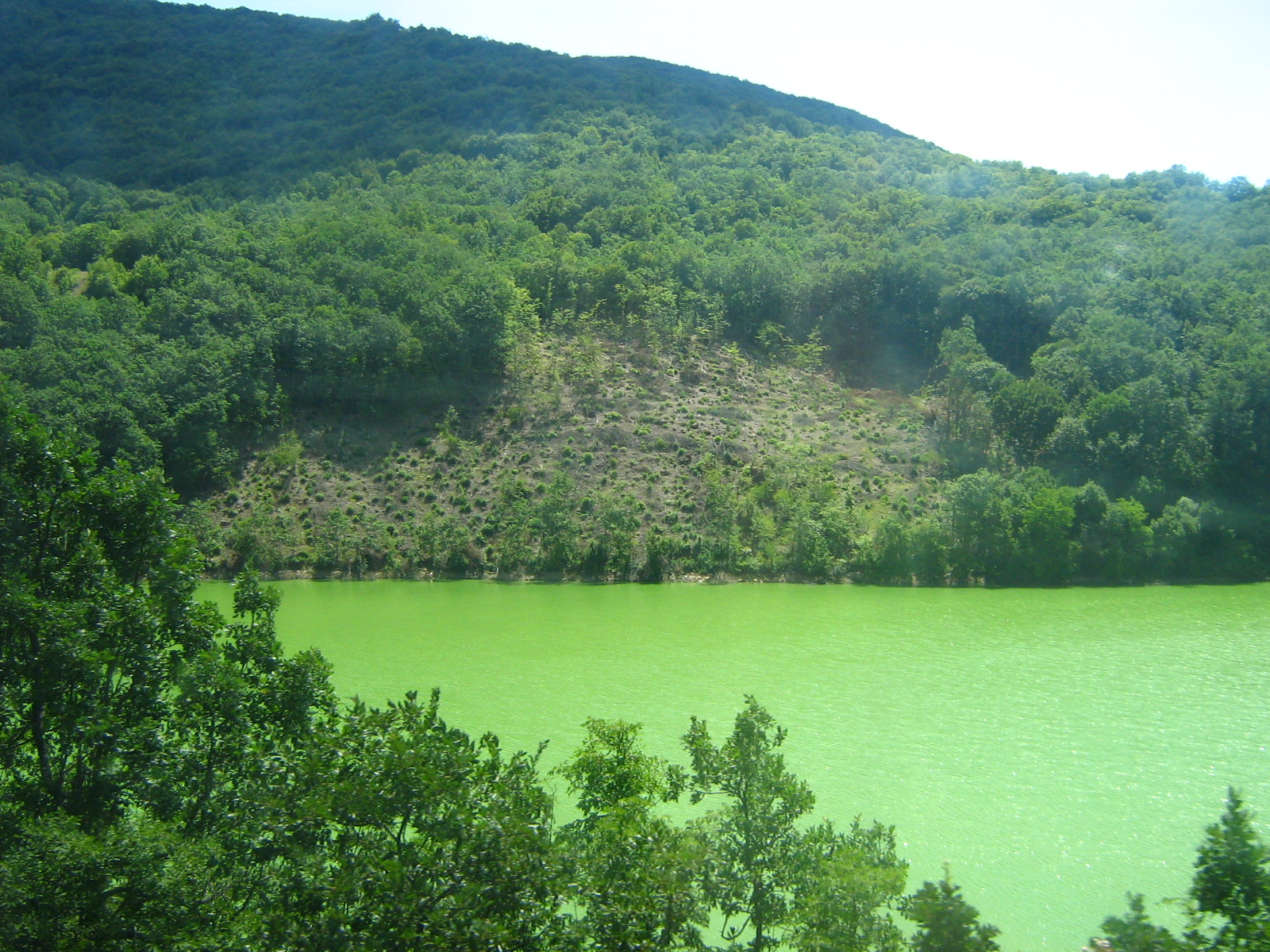
View of the lake from near the dam, during the algal bloom (2008)

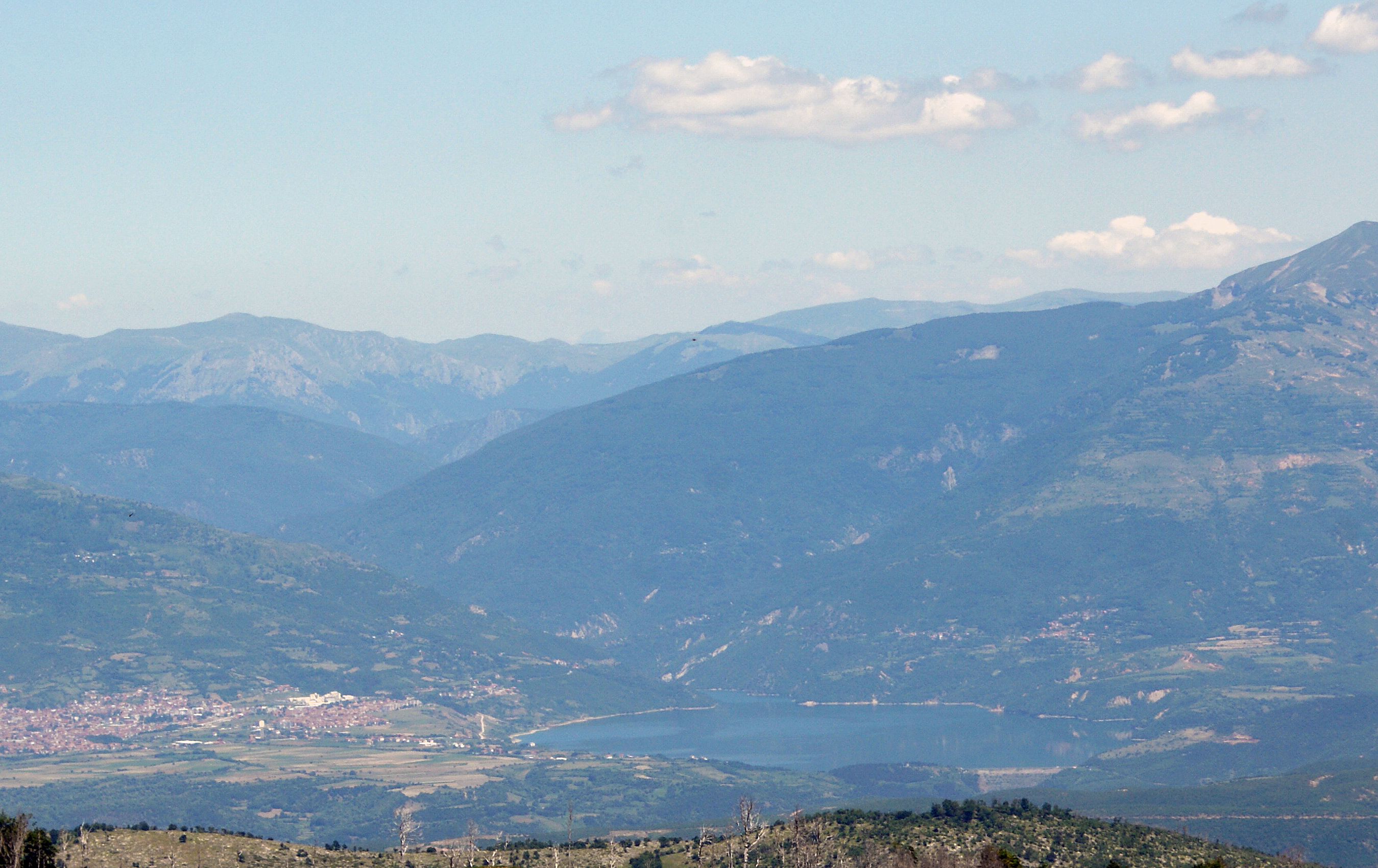
Debar and the lake (with dam at lower right), seen from the west.

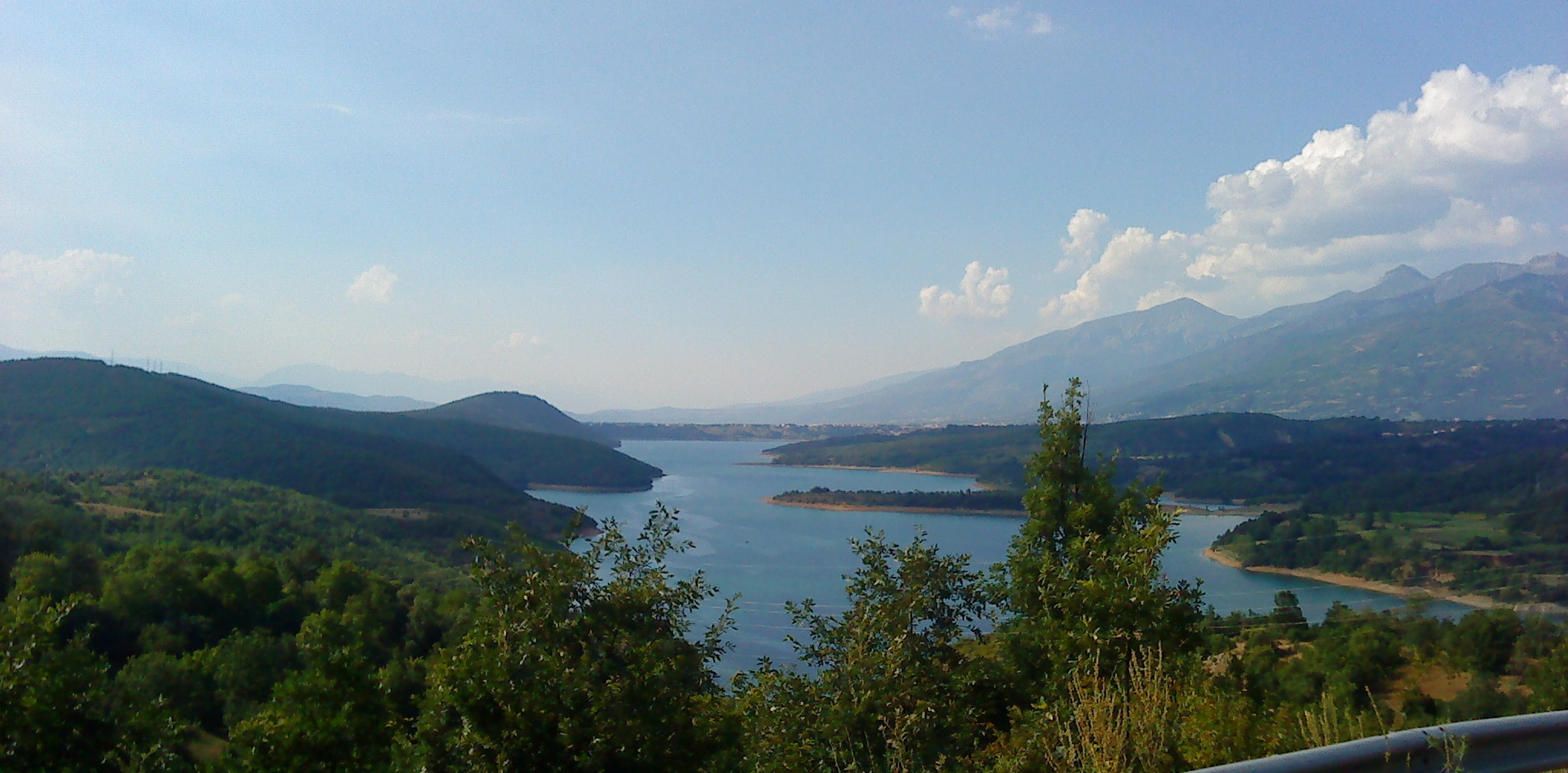
View towards Debar

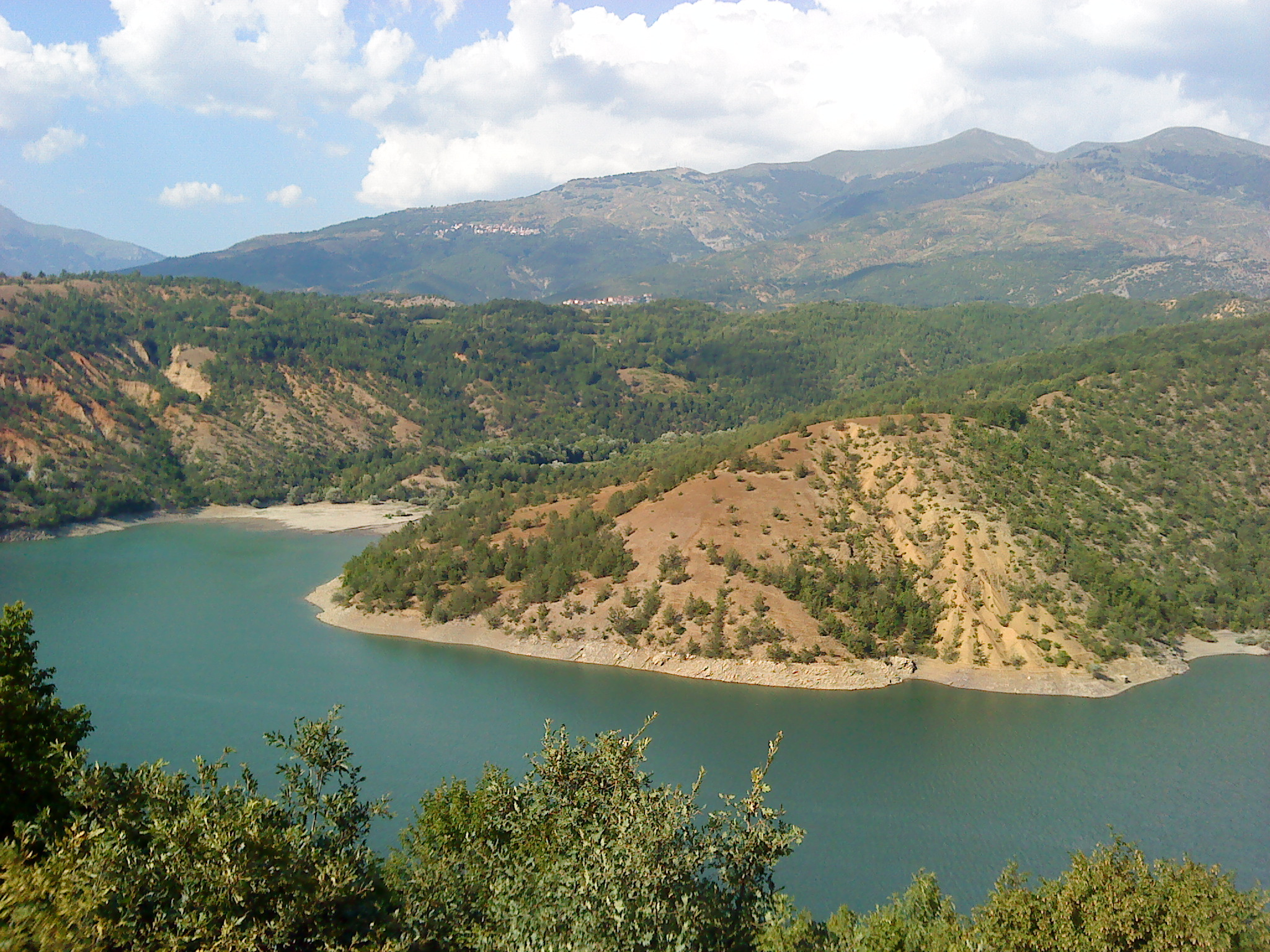
Sparse growth on the shore of the lake

== Bibliography ==
- Boris Nikodinovski (2000). Osnovi na voena geografija na Republika Makedonija. Edicija učebnici. Skopje: Niko Kompjuteri.
