= Rajčica =

Rajčica Рајчица Rajçicë
- Village
- Location within North Macedonia
- Coordinates: 41°31′N 20°33′E
- Country: North Macedonia
- Region: Southwestern
- Municipality: Debar

Population (2021)
  - Total: 162
- Time zone: UTC+1 (CET)
  - Summer (DST): UTC+2 (CEST)
- Car plates: DB
- Website: .

Rajčica (Macedonian: Рајчица, Albanian: Rajçicë) is a village in the municipality of Debar, North Macedonia.

== Demographics ==
As of the 2021 census, Rajčica had 162 residents with the following ethnic composition:

- Albanians 70
- Macedonians 56
- Turks 16
- Others (including Torbeš) 12
- Persons for whom data are taken from administrative sources 8

According to the 2002 census, the village had a total of 131 inhabitants. Ethnic groups in the village include:

- Albanians 72
- Macedonians 42
- Turks 1
- Others 16
