= League of Peja =

Albanian political organization

- Lidhja e Pejës
- Founder: Haxhi Zekaj
- Dissolved: May 1900
- Legal status: disestablished
- Purpose: Defence of Albania and anti-westernization of the Ottoman Empire
- Location: Peja, Ottoman Empire
- Leader: Haxhi Zeka

The League of Peja (Albanian: Lidhja e Pejës), also known as League of İpek or Besa-Besë (Pledge for a Pledge) between Albanians, was an Albanian political organization established in 1899 in the city of İpek (now Peja), Kosovo Vilayet, Ottoman Empire. It was led by Haxhi Zeka, a former member of the League of Prizren, and shared the same aim of achieving an autonomous Albanian vilayet within the Ottoman Empire. This organization was encouraged and supported by Austria-Hungary and directed against Ottoman reforms and against Serbs from Kosovo Vilayet.

Albanian patriotic circles had been seeing a need of creating a new organisation, similar to the first League of Prizren, and to include all the Albanian lands and place it in front of a national movement.

== Background and formation ==
Albanian leaders organised a meeting in Yakova (now Gjakova) in March–April 1897 as a first step for the creation of the league. There were two groups of members. The first group of conservative and more moderate members wanted five vilayets (with Salonika vilayet included) to be united into the Albanian vilayet, and the second group of the more radical members wanted full administrative autonomy for the four vilayets united in the Albanian vilayet.

The League was founded in late January 1899, led by Haxhi Zeka, a Muslim cleric, and its goals reflected a strongly Islamic and traditionalist (anti-Westernization) vision. There were still slight disagreements among the leaders in terms of the details of this vision, Haxhi Zeka, for instance, wanted more autonomy from Istanbul to insulate Albanians from the Western reforms spreading from Istanbul, while Riza Bey Kryeziu, wanted the attention to be directed against Sultan Abdul Hamid's rivals and did not see autonomy as a necessity.

Nevertheless, the final agreement consisted of twelve points focused on territorial defence and loyalty to the Sultan, with the besë sworn on the Qur'an. Local Muslim committees were to be established to guard public order and govern according to both the Sharia and the Kanun. Autonomy was not explicitly mentioned in the agreement, and the only notably progressive element was support for Albanian-language education.

== Dissolution ==
The League ended its activity in 1900, after an armed conflict with the Ottoman forces. Zeka was assassinated by Serbian agent Adem Zajmi in 1902.

== See also ==
- Selim Rusi
