= Selim Rusi =

Early 20th century Albanian patriot

Selim Rusi (c. 1821–1905) was an Albanian patriot who was one of the most prominent activists of the Albanian National Awakening in the late 19th century and early 20th century. He was born in Debar, then part of the Ottoman Empire (modern North Macedonia) to an Albanian family known for patriotism. In 1899 he represented the Sanjak of Debar at the meeting that established the League of Peja, an organisation that aimed at advancing the rights of the Albanians in the Ottoman Empire. Later that year he was one of the leaders of a revolt in the Sanjak of Debar as planned by the League of Peja. Although he failed to organise a meeting of local patriots at Debar, the revolt in which he was involved was a turning point in the struggle of the Albanians for independence. His grandson is Sherif Langu, he and his family spoke Albanian in the Gheg dialect.
