= Šutovo, Kičevo =

Šutovo Шутово Shutovë
- Village
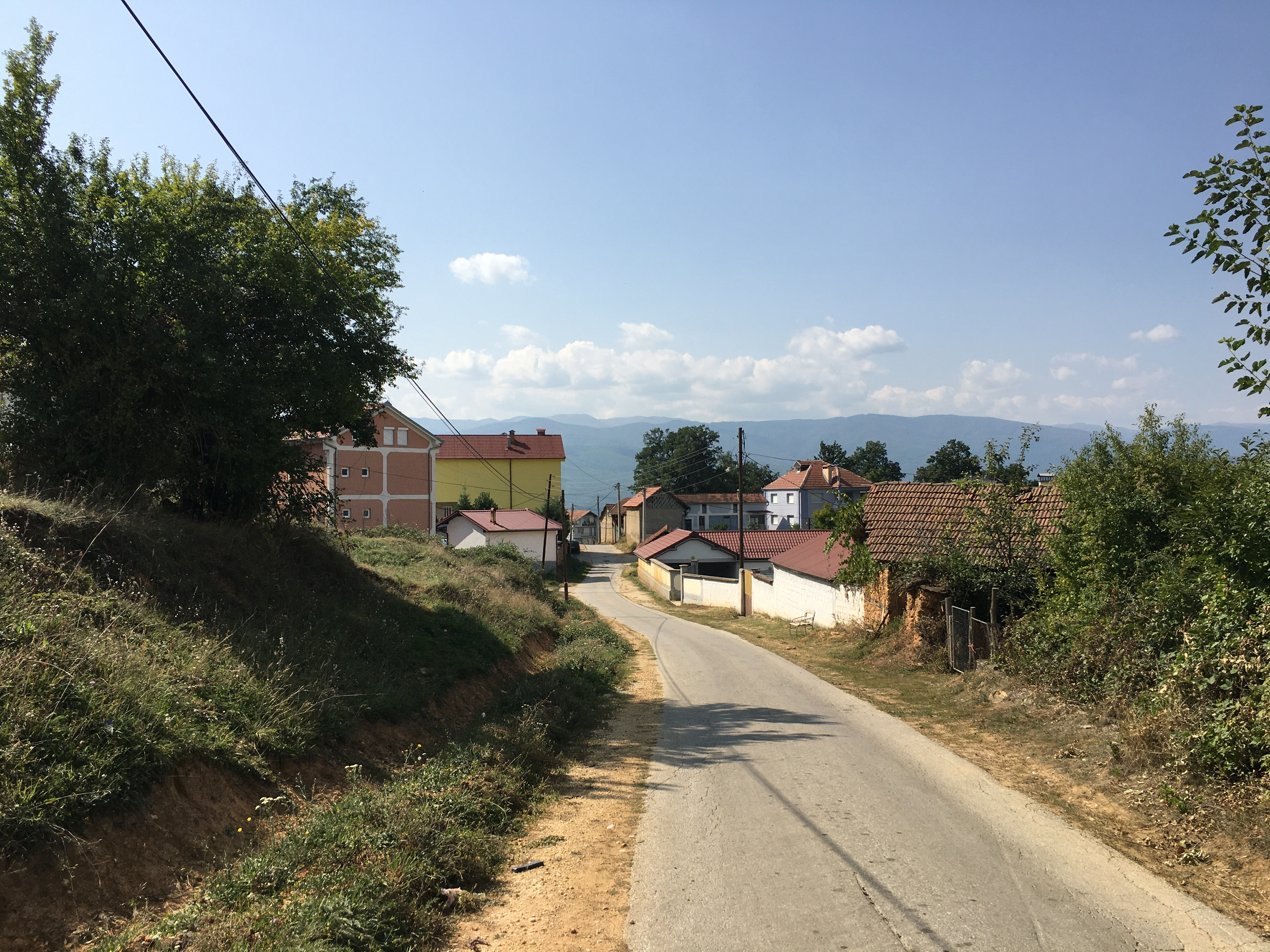
- Street in the village

- Location within North Macedonia
- Coordinates: 41°32′49″N 21°01′19″E
- Country: North Macedonia
- Region: Southwestern
- Municipality: Kičevo

Population (2021)
  - Total: 397
- Time zone: UTC+1 (CET)
  - Summer (DST): UTC+2 (CEST)
- Car plates: KI
- Website: .

Šutovo (Macedonian: Шутово, Albanian: Shutovë) is a village in the municipality of Kičevo, North Macedonia. It used to be part of the former municipality of Oslomej.

== History ==
During the period of 1912–1913, members of the Serbian army led by chetnik Mikajle Brodski massacred a total of 23 Albanians from the village. After the capture of the village by Partisan forces in the autumn of 1944, a further 16 Albanian men were massacred by the communist forces.

== Demographics ==
As of the 2021 census, Šutovo had 397 residents with the following ethnic composition:

- Albanians – 376
- Persons for whom data are taken from administrative sources – 21

According to the 2002 census, the village had a total of 760 inhabitants. Ethnic groups in the village include:

- Albanians 737
- Macedonians 12
- Others 11

According to the 1942 Albanian census, Šutovo was inhabited by a total of 668 Muslim Albanians.

The village is attested in the 1467/68 Ottoman tax registry (defter) for the Nahiyah of Kırçova. The village had a total of 55 houses, excluding bachelors (mucerred).
