= Trapčin Dol =

Trapčin Dol Трапчин Дол Trapçidoll
- Village
- Location within North Macedonia
- Coordinates: 41°33′N 20°58′E
- Country: North Macedonia
- Region: Southwestern
- Municipality: Kičevo

Population (2021)
  - Total: 357
- Time zone: UTC+1 (CET)
  - Summer (DST): UTC+2 (CEST)
- Car plates: KI

Trapčin Dol (Macedonian: Трапчин Дол, Albanian: Trapçidoll) is a village in the municipality of Kičevo, North Macedonia.

== History ==
During the period of 1912-1913, chetnik forces led by Mikajle Brodski along with locals from Raštani, massacred a total of 9 Albanians from the village. The village avoided larger attacks from Chetnik forces through the actions of the krypeplak (village elder) Shukri Asani, who gathered the riches of the villagers and paid a tribute to voivode Mikajle. After the capture of the village by Partisan forces in 1944, 12 Albanian men were executed by the incoming communist forces.

== Demographics ==
The village is attested in the 1467/68 Ottoman tax registry (defter) for the Nahiyah of Kırçova. The village had a total of 66 houses, excluding bachelors (mucerred).

As of the 2021 census, Trapčin Dol had 357 residents with the following ethnic composition:

- Albanians 339
- Persons for whom data are taken from administrative sources 17
- Macedonians 1

According to the 2002 census, the village had a total of 914 inhabitants. Ethnic groups in the village include:

- Albanians 896
- Macedonians 2
- Others 16
