= Popovjani =

Popovjani Поповјани Popojan
- Village
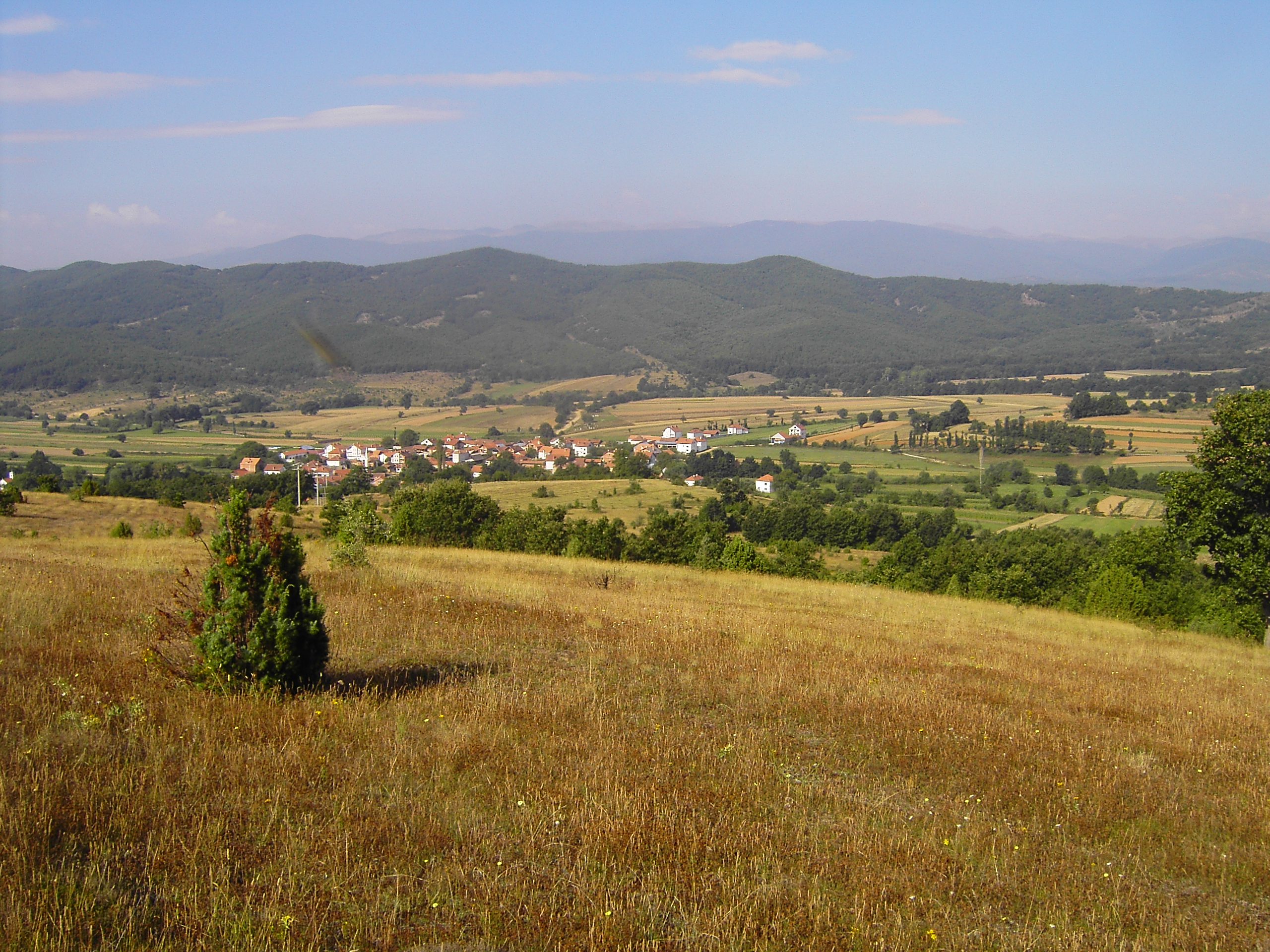
- Popovjani

- Location within North Macedonia
- Coordinates: 41°37′N 21°00′E
- Country: North Macedonia
- Region: Southwestern
- Municipality: Kičevo

Population (2021)
  - Total: 142
- Time zone: UTC+1 (CET)
  - Summer (DST): UTC+2 (CEST)
- Car plates: KI
- Website: .

Popovjani (Macedonian: Поповјани, Albanian: Popojan) is a village in the municipality of Kičevo, North Macedonia. It was previously in Oslomej Municipality until that municipality was merged into Kičevo Municipality.

== History ==
During the period of 1912–1913, members the Serbian army led by chetnik Mikajle Brodski massacred a total of 46 Albanians in the village. The bodies were buried in mass graves.

== Demographics ==
The village is attested in the 1467/68 Ottoman tax registry (defter) for the Nahiyah of Kırçova. The village had a total of 20 houses, excluding bachelors (mucerred).

According to the 1942 Albanian census, Popovjani was inhabited by a total of 193 Muslim Albanians and 120 Serbs.

As of the 2021 census, Popovjani had 142 residents with the following ethnic composition:

- Albanians 135
- Persons for whom data are taken from administrative sources 6
- Macedonians 1

According to the 2002 census, the village had a total of 399 inhabitants. Ethnic groups in the village include:

- Albanians 397
- Macedonians 2
