= Berikovo =

Berikovo Бериково Berikovë
- Village
- Location within North Macedonia
- Coordinates: 41°38′N 21°00′E
- Country: North Macedonia
- Region: Southwestern
- Municipality: Kičevo

Population (2021)
  - Total: 34
- Time zone: UTC+1 (CET)
  - Summer (DST): UTC+2 (CEST)
- Car plates: KI
- Website: .

Berikovo (Macedonian: Бериково, Albanian: Berikovë) is a village in the municipality of Kičevo, North Macedonia. It used to be part of the former municipality of Oslomej.

== History ==
During the period of 1912-1913, members the Serbian army massacred 6 Albanian elders from the village, with local inhabitants claiming a larger figure. After the capture of the village by Partisan forces in the autumn of 1944, a further 11 Albanian men were massacred.

== Demographics ==
The village is attested in the 1467/68 Ottoman tax registry (defter) for the Nahiyah of Kırçova. The village had a total of 7 houses, excluding bachelors (mucerred).

According to the 1942 Albanian census, Berikovo was inhabited by a total of 235 Muslim Albanians.

As of the 2021 census, Berikovo had 34 residents with the following ethnic composition:

- Albanians (30)
- Persons for whom data are taken from administrative sources (4)

According to the 2002 census, the village had a total of 168 inhabitants. Ethnic groups in the village include:

- Albanians (168)
