= Dlapkin Dol =

Dlapkin Dol Длапкин Дол Llapkidoll
- Village
- Location within North Macedonia
- Coordinates: 41°34′N 20°56′E
- Country: North Macedonia
- Region: Southwestern
- Municipality: Kičevo

Population (2021)
  - Total: 388
- Time zone: UTC+1 (CET)
  - Summer (DST): UTC+2 (CEST)
- Car plates: KI
- Website: .

Dlapkin Dol (Macedonian: Длапкин Дол, Albanian: Llapkidoll) is a village in the municipality of Kičevo, North Macedonia. It used to be part of the former Zajas Municipality.

== History ==
During the period of 1912-1913, members the Serbian army massacred committed a massacre in the village. The Hajro, Meti, Qerimi families were eradicated, as well as 18 other inhabitants of the village. After the capture of the village by Partisan forces, 11 Albanian men were executed by the incoming communist forces.

== Demographics ==
The village is attested in the 1467/68 Ottoman tax registry (defter) for the Nahiyah of Kırçova. The village had a total of 7 houses, excluding bachelors (mucerred).

According to the 1942 Albanian census, Dlapkin Dol was inhabited by a total of 345 Muslim Albanians.

As of the 2021 census, Dlapkin Dol had 388 residents with the following ethnic composition:

- Albanians 368
- Persons for whom data are taken from administrative sources 20

According to the 2002 census, the village had a total of 636 inhabitants. Ethnic groups in the village include:

- Albanians – 633
- Macedonians – 1
- Others – 2
