= Kolibari =

Village in Kičevo Municipality, North Macedonia

Kolibari Колибари Kolibarë
- Village
- Location within North Macedonia
- Coordinates: 41°34′N 20°58′E
- Country: North Macedonia
- Region: Southwestern
- Municipality: Kičevo

Population (2021)
  - Total: 355
- Time zone: UTC+1 (CET)
  - Summer (DST): UTC+2 (CEST)
- Car plates: KI
- Website: .

Kolibari (Macedonian: Колибари, Albanian: Kolibarë) is a village in the municipality of Kičevo, North Macedonia. It used to be part of the former Zajas Municipality.

== History ==
Kolibari contains two archaeological sites: Roman-era graves and a necropolis from the Middle Ages.

During the period of 1912–1913, members of the Serbian army massacred a total of 6 Albanian men from the village. Communist Partisan forces later killed 5 more Albanians in 1944 and burned the village, leading to an outbreak of typhus that resulted in the deaths of 37 inhabitants.

== Demographics ==
As of the 2021 census, Kolibari had 355 residents with the following ethnic composition:

- Albanians 338
- Persons for whom data are taken from administrative sources 17

According to the 2002 census, the village had a total of 742 inhabitants. Ethnic groups in the village include:

- Albanians 742
