= Bukojčani =

Bukojčani Букојчани Bukojçan
- Village
- Location within North Macedonia
- Coordinates: 41°38′N 20°58′E
- Country: North Macedonia
- Region: Southwestern
- Municipality: Kičevo

Population (2021)
  - Total: 25
- Time zone: UTC+1 (CET)
  - Summer (DST): UTC+2 (CEST)
- Car plates: KI
- Website: .

Bukojčani (Macedonian: Букојчани, Albanian: Bukojçan) is a village in the municipality of Kičevo, North Macedonia. It used to be part of the former Zajas Municipality.

== Demographics ==
The village is attested in the 1467/68 Ottoman tax registry (defter) for the Nahiyah of Kırçova. The village was divided in two with one part having 30 and the other 43 houses excluding bachelors (mucerred). One part was held by one timariot and the other by two.

As of the 2021 census, Bukojčani had 25 residents with the following ethnic composition:

- Albanians 14
- Macedonians 8
- Persons for whom data are taken from administrative sources 3

According to the 2002 census, the village had a total of 97 inhabitants. Ethnic groups in the village include:

- Albanians: 74
- Macedonians: 23

== Notable people ==
- Voislav "Vojo" Stojanovski, Yugoslav and later Macedonian folk singer
