= Lešnica, Kičevo =

Lešnica Лешница Leshnicë
- Village
- Location within North Macedonia
- Coordinates: 41°34′17″N 20°54′33″E
- Country: North Macedonia
- Region: Southwestern
- Municipality: Kičevo

Population (2021)
  - Total: 95
- Time zone: UTC+1 (CET)
  - Summer (DST): UTC+2 (CEST)
- Car plates: KI
- Website: .

Lešnica (Macedonian: Лешница, Albanian: Leshnicë) is a village in the municipality of Kičevo, North Macedonia. It used to be part of the former Zajas Municipality.

== Demographics ==
The village is attested in the 1467/68 Ottoman tax registry (defter) for the Nahiyah of Kırçova. The village had a total of 15 houses, excluding bachelors (mucerred).

According to the 1942 Albanian census, Lešnica was inhabited by a 128 Muslim Albanians and 103 Serbian-speaking Orthodox Albanians.

As of the 2021 census, Lešnica had 95 residents with the following ethnic composition:

- Albanians 70
- Macedonians 20
- Persons for whom data are taken from administrative sources 5

According to the 2002 census, the village had a total of 219 inhabitants. Ethnic groups in the village include:

- Albanians 182
- Macedonians 37
