= Lazarovci =

Lazarovci Лазаровци Llazrovcë
- Village
- Location within North Macedonia
- Coordinates: 41°32′4″N 20°59′44″E
- Country: North Macedonia
- Region: Southwestern
- Municipality: Kičevo

Population (2021)
  - Total: 60
- Time zone: UTC+1 (CET)
  - Summer (DST): UTC+2 (CEST)
- Car plates: KI
- Website: .

Lazarovci (Macedonian: Лазаровци, Albanian: Llazrovcë) is a village in the municipality of Kičevo, North Macedonia. It used to be part of the former Oslomej Municipality.

== Demographics ==
The village is attested in the 1467/68 Ottoman tax registry (defter) for the Nahiyah of Kırçova. The village was partly owned by the beylerbey and the timariot, having a total of 10 and 19 houses, excluding bachelors (mucerred).

According to the 1942 Albanian census, Lazarovci was inhabited by a total of 170 Bulgarians.

As of the 2021 census, Lazarovci had ninety (90) residents with the following ethnic composition:

- Macedonians: 50
- Albanians: 35
- Serbs: 1
- Persons for whom data are taken from administrative sources 4
