= Gorno Strogomište =

Gorno Strogomište Горно Строгомиште Drogomisht i Madh
- Village
- Location within North Macedonia
- Coordinates: 41°36′N 20°58′E
- Country: North Macedonia
- Region: Southwestern
- Municipality: Kičevo

Population (2021)
  - Total: 699
- Time zone: UTC+1 (CET)
  - Summer (DST): UTC+2 (CEST)
- Car plates: KI
- Website: .

Gorno Strogomište (Macedonian: Горно Строгомиште, Albanian: Drogomisht i Madh) is a village in the municipality of Kičevo, North Macedonia. It used to be part of the former Zajas Municipality.

== Demographics ==
The village is attested in the 1467/68 Ottoman tax registry (defter) for the Nahiyah of Kırçova. The village had a total of 36 houses, excluding bachelors (mucerred).

As of the 2021 census, Gorno Strogomište had 699 residents with the following ethnic composition:

- Albanians 611
- Persons for whom data are taken from administrative sources 88

According to the 2002 census, the village had a total of 1,123 inhabitants. Ethnic groups in the village include:

- Albanians 1,093
- Macedonians 4
- Others 26
