= Jagol =

Jagol Јагол Jagoll
- Village
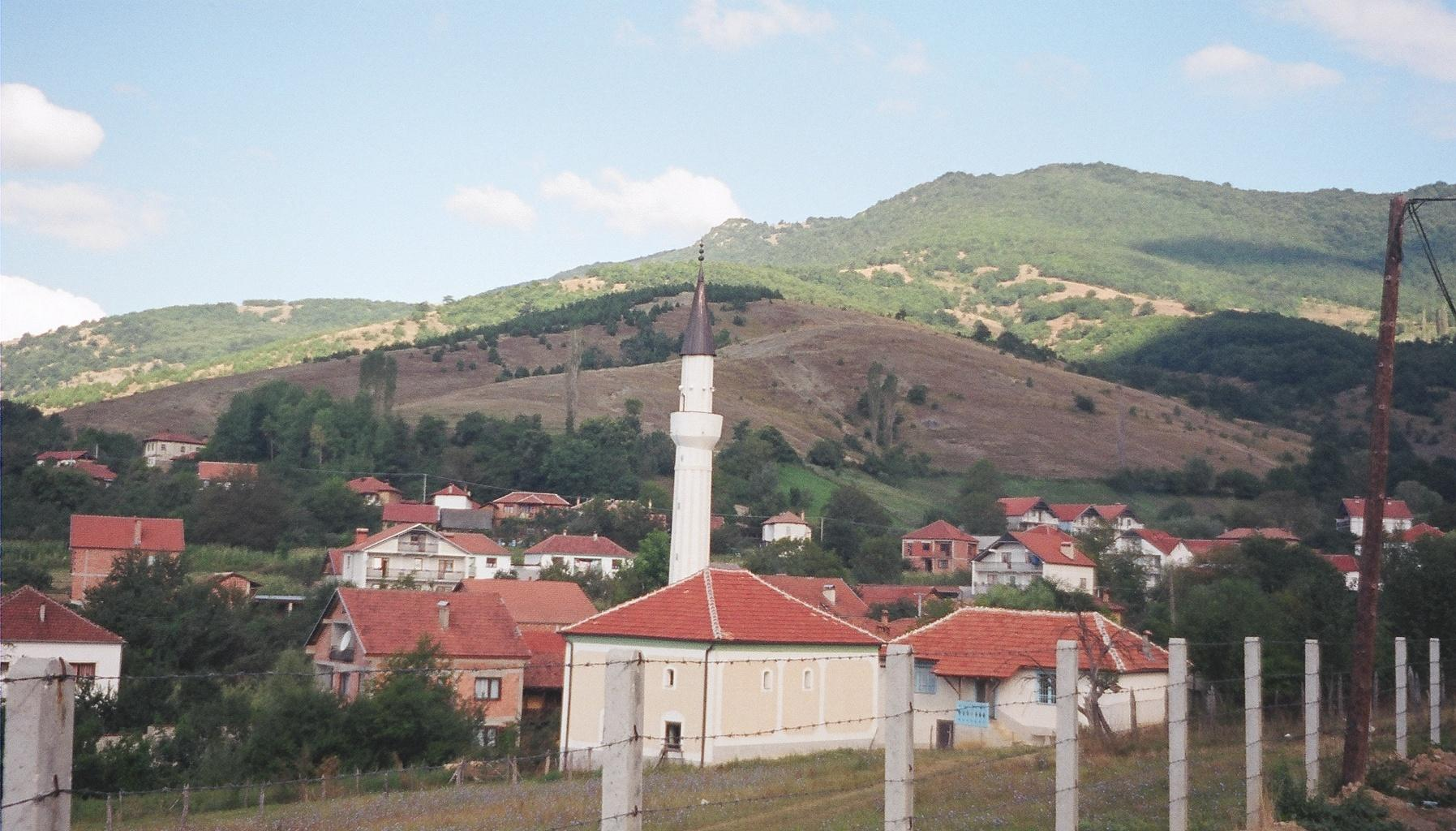

- Location within North Macedonia
- Coordinates: 41°38′N 21°00′E
- Country: North Macedonia
- Region: Southwestern
- Municipality: Kičevo

Population (2021)
  - Total: 215
- Time zone: UTC+1 (CET)
  - Summer (DST): UTC+2 (CEST)
- Car plates: KI
- Website: .

Jagol (Macedonian: Јагол, Albanian: Jagoll) is a village in the municipality of Kičevo, North Macedonia. It used to be part of the former municipality of Oslomej

== Demographics ==
According to the 1942 Albanian census, Jagol was inhabited by a total of 310 Muslim Albanians, 90 Bulgarians and 29 Serbs.

As of the 2021 census, Jagol had 215 residents with the following ethnic composition:

- Albanians 202
- Persons for whom data are taken from administrative sources 8
- Macedonians 5

According to the 2002 census, the village had a total of 406 inhabitants. Ethnic groups in the village include:

- Albanians 399
- Macedonians 4
- Others 3
