= Bačišta =

Bačišta Бачишта Baçisht
- Village
- Location within North Macedonia
- Coordinates: 41°36′N 20°54′E
- Country: North Macedonia
- Region: Southwestern
- Municipality: Kičevo

Population (2021)
  - Total: 470
- Time zone: UTC+1 (CET)
  - Summer (DST): UTC+2 (CEST)
- Car plates: KI
- Website: .

Bačišta (Macedonian: Бачишта, Albanian: Baçisht) is a village in the municipality of Kičevo, North Macedonia. It used to be part of the former Zajas Municipality. The village has an Albanian school and a mosque.

== History ==
The village is attested in the 1467/68 Ottoman tax registry (defter) for the Nahiyah of Kırçova. The village had a total of 34 houses, excluding bachelors (mucerred).

The villages Albanian muslim Population was introduced/ kickstarted by 2 Brothers of an Albanian family of Zajas, who came to an orthodox slavic speaking village.The names of the two brothers were Nezir and Ibraim

The village population consists of a traditionally Albanian Muslim speaking population that is surrounded by Muslim Albanian villages. The population consists of ethnic Albanians. In the 1990s parents from Bačišta refused to send their children to the local village Macedonian language school and the introduction of Albanian schooling was attempted. Inhabitants of Bačišta have claimed to be Macedonianized Albanians. In 1992 Albanian schooling until the 8th grade was introduced in Bačišta.

== Demographics ==
According to a statistic encompassed in an ethnographic work of ethnographer Toma Smiljanik, published through his book "Кичевија – Тома Смиљаниќ (1926)", the ethnic composition of the village in the year 1921, further also specifying the specific place of origin for each of the inhabitants families, was as follows:

• 87 Muslim Albanian Families (houses/"домова"), originally from : Zajas

• 0 Starinci (Slavs )

• 0 Cigani (Gypsies)

The total inhabitants numbered 404 People. In statistics gathered by Vasil Kanchov in 1900, the village of Bačišta was inhabited by 450 Muslim Bulgarians. The Yugoslav census of 1953 recorded 501 people of whom 407 were Albanians, 26 Macedonians, 1 Turks and 7 others. The 1961 Yugoslav census recorded 527 people of whom 514 were Albanians, 4 Turks, 2 Macedonians and 7 others. The 1971 census recorded 642 people of whom 612 were Albanians, 20 Turks, 2 Macedonian and 8 others. The 1981 Yugoslav census recorded 646 people of whom 581 were Albanians, 34 Macedonians, 3 Turks, 13 Bosniaks and 15 others. The Macedonian census of 1994 recorded 685 people of whom 684 were Albanians and 1 other.

As of the 2021 census, Bačišta had 470 residents with the following ethnic composition:

- Albanians 443
- Persons for whom data are taken from administrative sources 25
- Roma 2

According to the 2002 census, the village had a total of 772 inhabitants. Ethnic groups in the village include:

- Albanians 756
- Macedonians 1
- Others 15

Mother tongues in the language was as follows

- Albanian 755
- Macedonian 1
- Serbian 1
- Other 15
