= Garani, Kičevo =

Village in North Macedonia

Garani Гарани Garanë
- Village
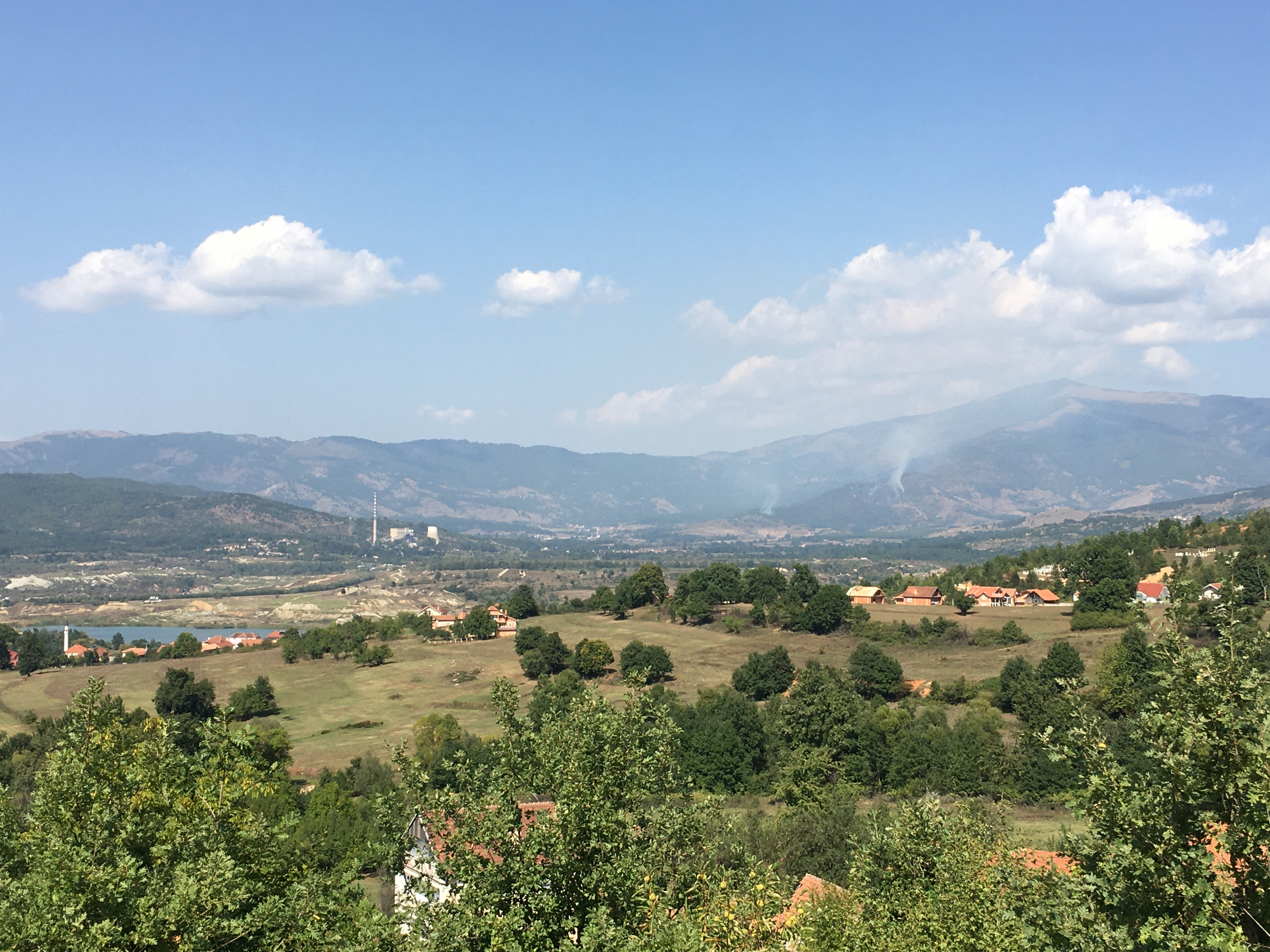

- Location within North Macedonia
- Coordinates: 41°32′N 21°01′E
- Country: North Macedonia
- Region: Southwestern
- Municipality: Kičevo

Population (2021)
  - Total: 27
- Time zone: UTC+1 (CET)
  - Summer (DST): UTC+2 (CEST)
- Car plates: KI
- Website: .

Garani (Macedonian: Гарани, Albanian: Garanë) is a village in the municipality of Kičevo, North Macedonia. It used to be part of the former municipality of Oslomej.

== History ==
After the capture of the village by Partisan forces in the autumn of 1944, 49 Albanian men were executed by the incoming communist forces.

== Demographics ==
According to the statistics of the Bulgarian ethnographer Vasil Kanchov from 1900, 400 inhabitants lived in Garani, all being Albanian Muslims.

According to the 1942 Albanian census, Garani was inhabited by a total of 323 Muslim Albanians.

According to the 2002 census, the village had a total of 542 inhabitants. Ethnic groups in the village include:

- Albanians 541
- Macedonians 1

As of the 2021 census, Garani had 27 residents with the following ethnic composition:

- Albanians 17
- Persons for whom data are taken from administrative sources 10
