= Rabetino =

- Village
- Рабетино
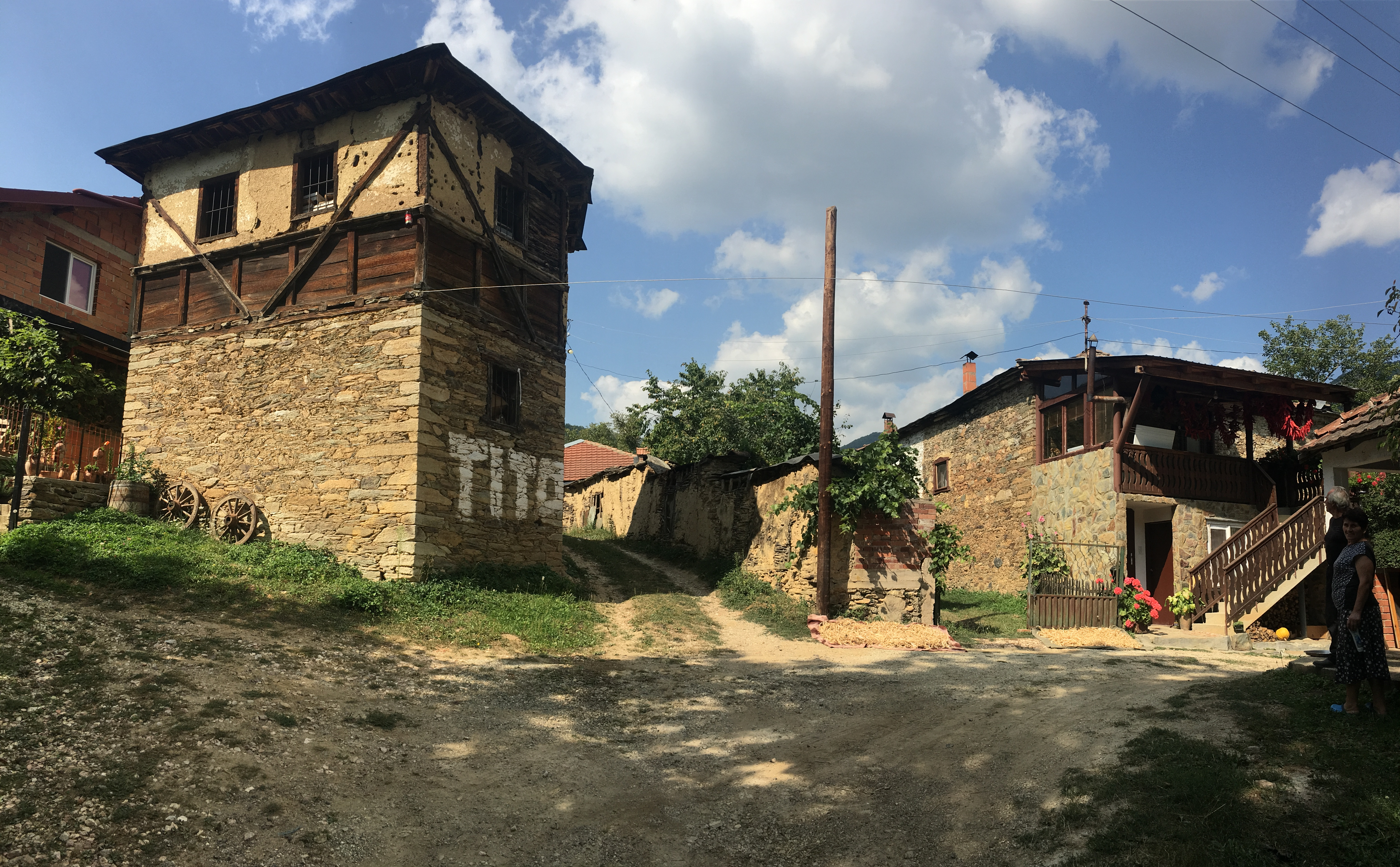

- Location within North Macedonia
- Coordinates: 41.5442°N 21.0664°E
- Country: North Macedonia
- Region: Southwestern
- Municipality: Kičevo

Population (2021)
  - Total: 5
- Time zone: UTC+1 (CET)
  - Summer (DST): UTC+2 (CEST)
- Car plates: KI
- Website: .

Rabetino (Macedonian: Рабетино) is a village in the municipality of Kičevo, North Macedonia. It used to be part of the former Vraneštica Municipality.

== Name ==
The name of the toponym derives via metathesis from Arb to Rab and with the suffix -ino, from a prefix Arbet-ino. Examples of this change, include Slavic Raban for the Arbani (Albanians) and for the Land of the Arbans (Albanians)- Rabania instead of the Albanian form Arbënia.

== Demographics ==
The village is attested in the 1467/68 Ottoman tax registry (defter) for the Nahiyah of Kırçova. The village had a total of 25 houses, excluding bachelors (mucerred).

As of the 2021 census, Rabetino had 5 residents with the following ethnic composition:

- Macedonians 4
- Persons for whom data are taken from administrative sources 1

According to the 2002 census, the village had a total of 195 inhabitants. Ethnic groups in the village include:

- Macedonians 3
