= Dolno Strogomište =

Dolno Strogomište Долно Строгомиште Drogomisht i Vogël
- Village
- Location within North Macedonia
- Coordinates: 41°36′N 20°58′E
- Country: North Macedonia
- Region: Southwestern
- Municipality: Kičevo

Population (2021)
  - Total: 355
- Time zone: UTC+1 (CET)
  - Summer (DST): UTC+2 (CEST)
- Car plates: KI
- Website: .

Dolno Strogomište (Macedonian: Долно Строгомиште, Albanian: Drogomisht i Vogël) is a village in the municipality of Kičevo, North Macedonia. It used to be part of the former Zajas Municipality.

== Demographics ==
The village is attested in the 1467/68 Ottoman tax registry (defter) for the Nahiyah of Kırçova. The village had a total of 18 houses, excluding bachelors (mucerred).

As of the 2021 census, Dolno Strogomište had 355 residents with the following ethnic composition:

- Albanians 337
- Persons for whom data are taken from administrative sources 18

According to the 2002 census, the village had a total of 698 inhabitants. Ethnic groups in the village include:

- Albanians 692
- Serbs 1
- Others 5
