= Novo Selo, Kičevo =

Novo Selo Ново Село Novosellë
- Village
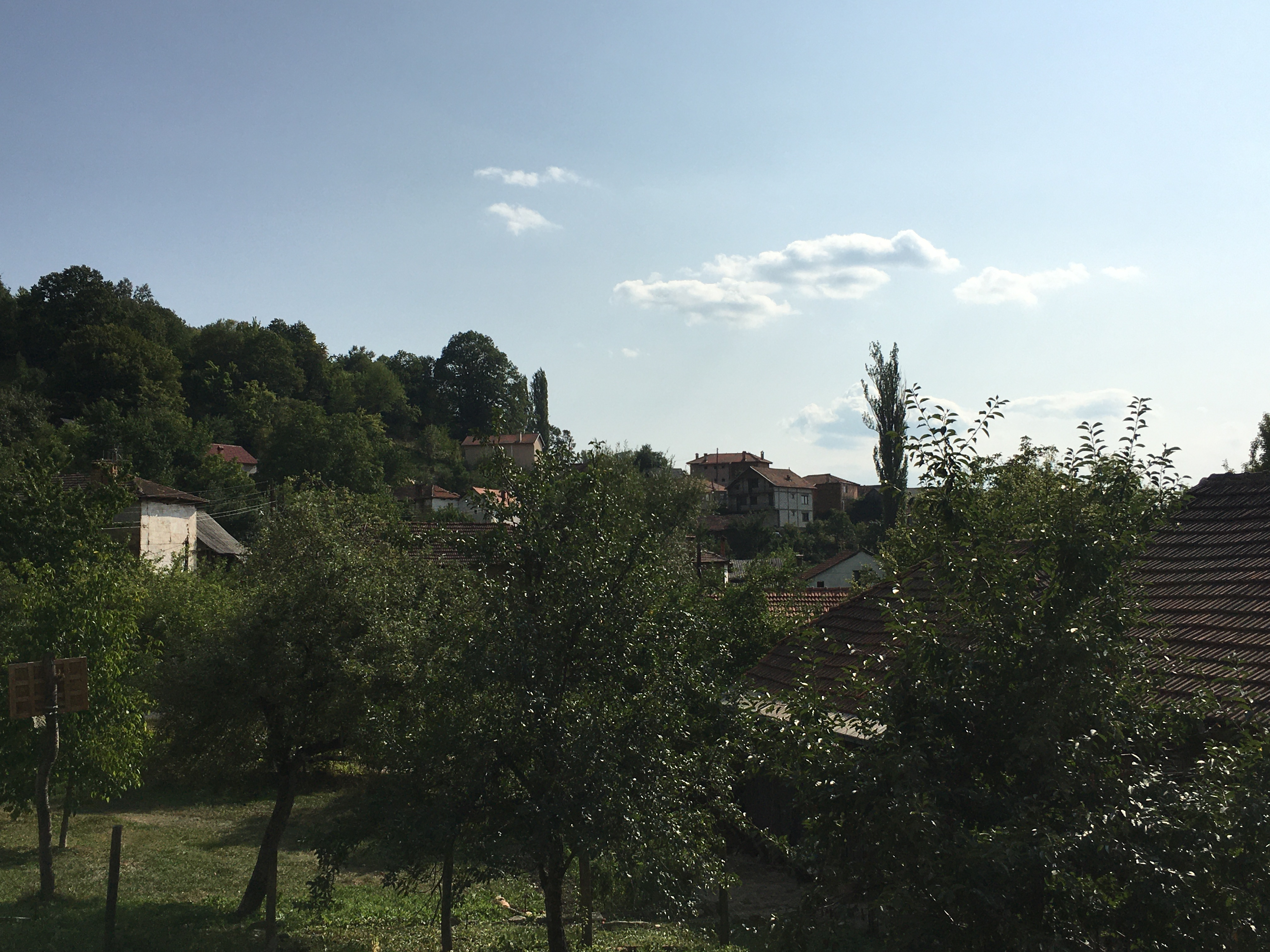
- View of the village

- Location within North Macedonia
- Coordinates: 41°35′12″N 21°03′10″E
- Country: North Macedonia
- Region: Southwestern
- Municipality: Kičevo

Population (2021)
  - Total: 38
- Time zone: UTC+1 (CET)
  - Summer (DST): UTC+2 (CEST)
- Car plates: KI
- Website: .

Novo Selo (Macedonian: Ново Село, Albanian: Novosellë) is a village in the municipality of Kičevo, North Macedonia. It used to be part of the former municipality of Oslomej. The etymology of the village comes from Slavic languages meaning new village, Novo Selo.

== History ==
After the capture of the village by Partisan forces in the autumn of 1944, 16 Albanian men, women and children were massacred by the incoming communist forces.

== Demographics ==
According to the 1942 Albanian census, Novo Selo was inhabited by a total of 260 Muslim Albanians, 58 Serbs, 26 Bulgarians.

As of the 2021 census, Novo Selo had 38 residents with the following ethnic composition:

- Albanians 36
- Macedonians 1
- Persons for whom data are taken from administrative sources 1

According to the 2002 census, the village had a total of 143 inhabitants. Ethnic groups in the village include:

- Albanians 141
- Macedonians 2
