= Premka =

Premka Премка Premkë
- Village
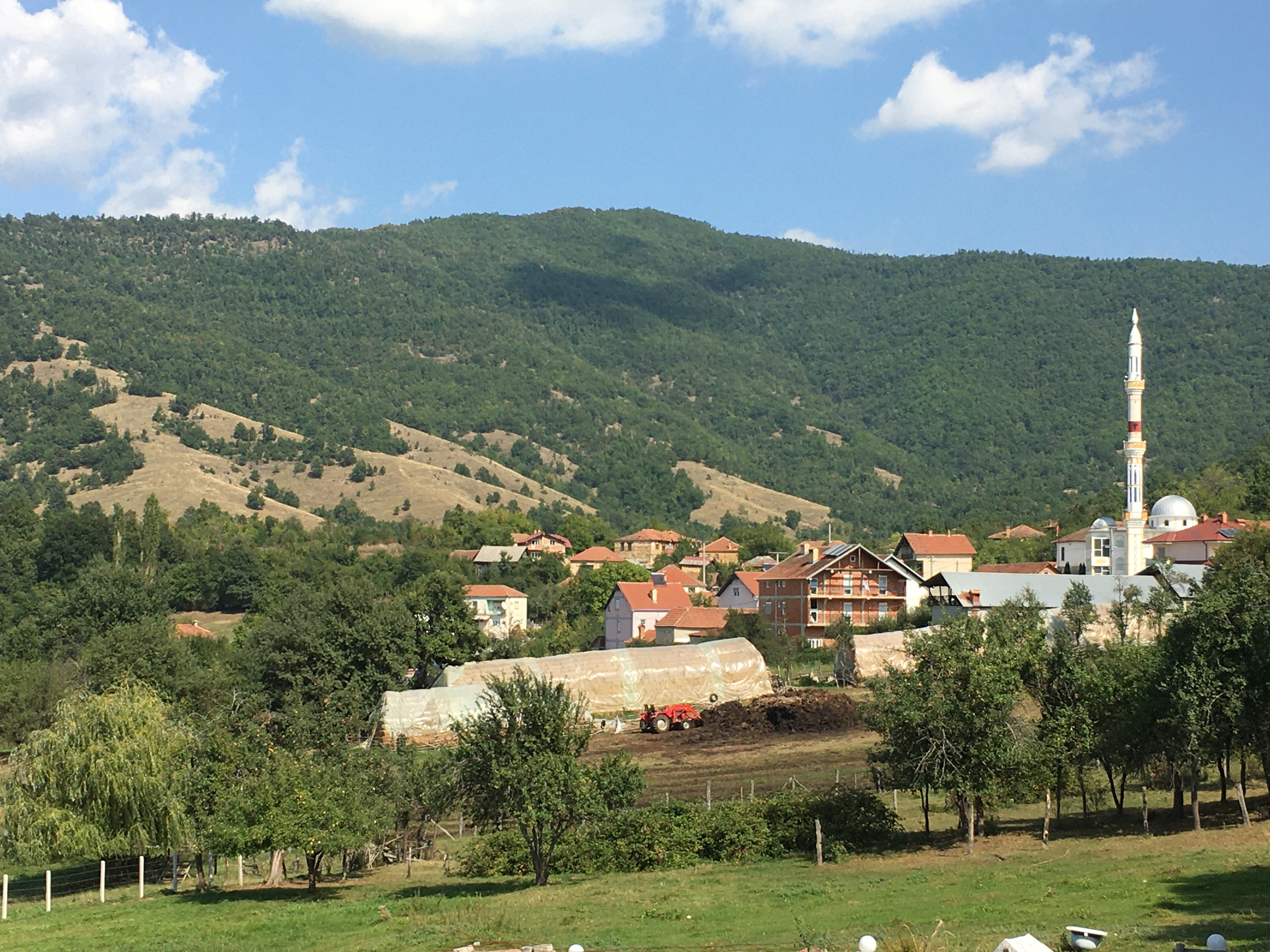
- View of the village

- Location within North Macedonia
- Coordinates: 41°33′N 21°02′E
- Country: North Macedonia
- Region: Southwestern
- Municipality: Kičevo

Population (2002)
  - Total: 134
- Time zone: UTC+1 (CET)
  - Summer (DST): UTC+2 (CEST)
- Car plates: KI
- Website: .

Premka (Macedonian: Премка, Albanian: Premkë) is a village in the municipality of Kičevo, North Macedonia. It used to be part of the former municipality of Oslomej.

== History ==
During the period of 1912-1913, locals along with Chetnik members immolated 2 Albanian men from the village. After the capture of the village by Partisan forces, 9 Albanian men were executed by the incoming communist forces.

== Demographics ==
The village is attested in the 1467/68 Ottoman tax registry (defter) for the Nahiyah of Kırçova. The village had a total of 77 houses, excluding bachelors (mucerred).

According to the 1942 Albanian census, Premka was inhabited by a total of 274 Serbs, 68 Muslim Albanians and 60 Bulgarians.

According to the 2002 census, the village had a total of 134 inhabitants. Ethnic groups in the village include:

- Albanians 108
- Macedonians 25
- Others 1

As of the 2021 census, Premka had 77 residents with the following ethnic composition:

- Albanians 71
- Macedonians 6
