= Arangel =

Arangel Арангел Haranjell
- Village
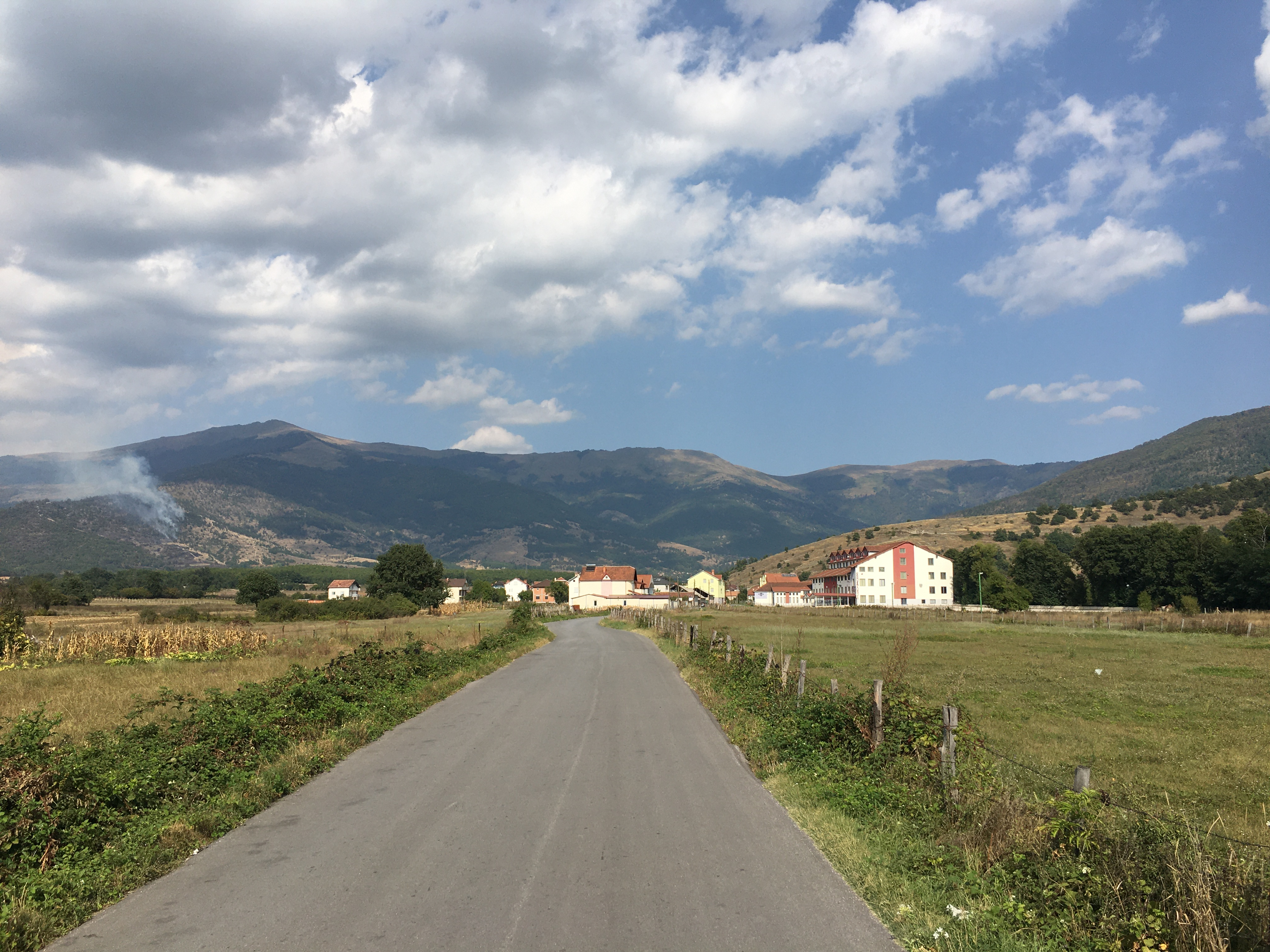

- Location within North Macedonia
- Coordinates: 41°36′N 21°01′E
- Country: North Macedonia
- Region: Southwestern
- Municipality: Kičevo

Population (2021)
  - Total: 292
- Time zone: UTC+1 (CET)
  - Summer (DST): UTC+2 (CEST)
- Car plates: KI
- Website: .

Arangel (Macedonian: Арангел, Albanian: Haranjell) is a village in the municipality of Kičevo, North Macedonia. It used to be part of the former municipality of Oslomej.

== History ==
After the capture of the village by Partisan forces, 7 Albanian men were executed by the incoming communist forces.

== Demographics ==
The village is attested in the 1467/68 Ottoman tax registry (defter) for the Nahiyah of Kırçova. The village was divided in two timars, one having 8 and the other 38 houses, excluding bachelors (mucerred).

According to the 1942 Albanian census, Arangel was inhabited by a total of 339 Muslim Albanians.

As of the 2021 census, Arangel had 292 residents with the following ethnic composition:

- Albanians 278
- Persons for whom data are taken from administrative sources 13
- Others 1

According to the 2002 census, the village had a total of 709 inhabitants. Ethnic groups in the village include:

- Albanians: 708
- Others: 1
