= Srbjani =

Srbjani Sërbjani
- Village
- Србјани
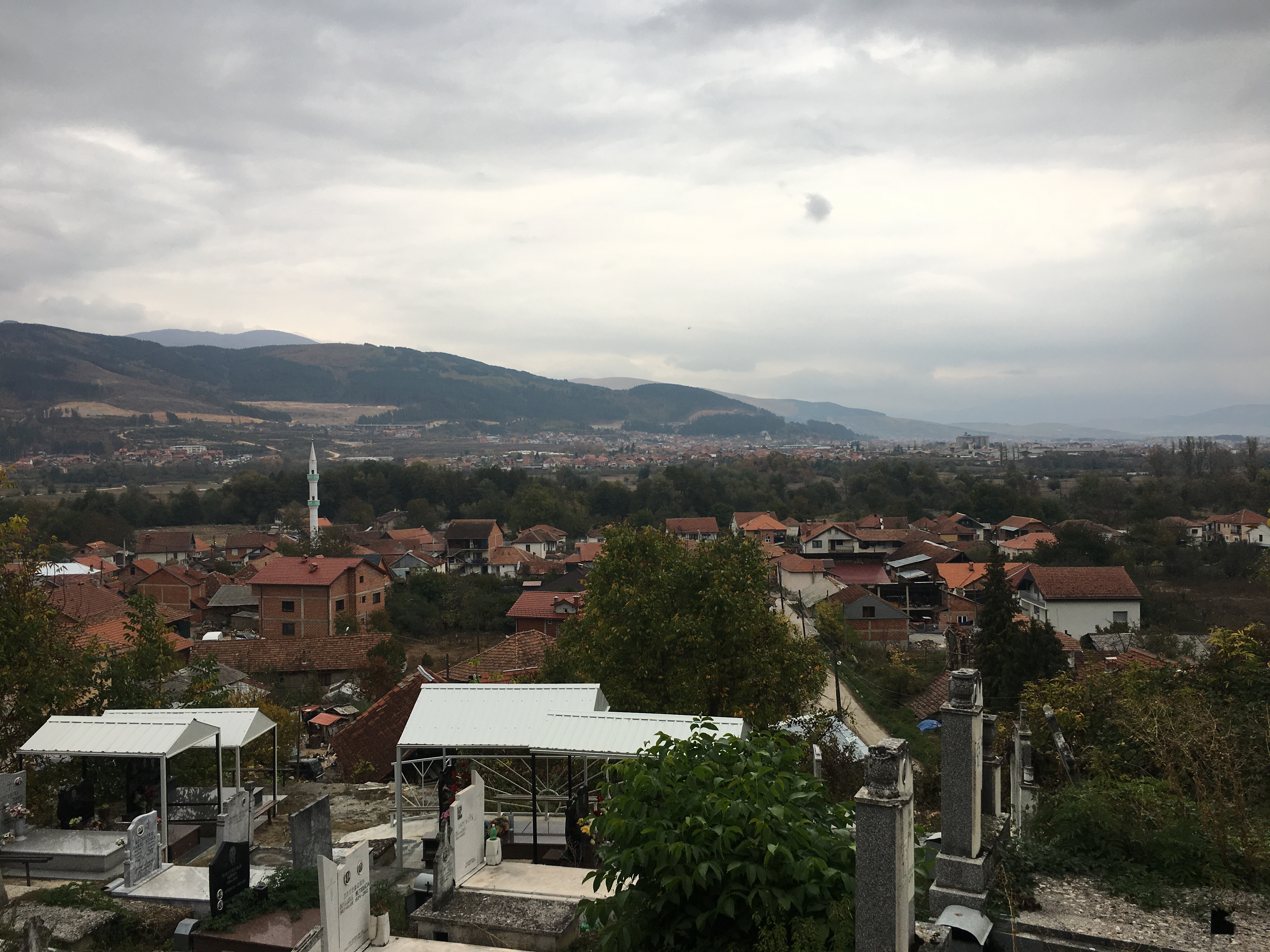
- Panoramic view of the village

- Location within North Macedonia
- Coordinates: 41°29′08″N 20°56′58″E
- Country: North Macedonia
- Region: Southwestern
- Municipality: Kičevo

Population (2021)
  - Total: 518
- Time zone: UTC+1 (CET)
  - Summer (DST): UTC+2 (CEST)
- Car plates: KI
- Website: .

Srbjani (Macedonian: Србјани,Albanian: Sërbjani) is a village in the municipality of Kičevo, North Macedonia. It used to be part of the former Drugovo Municipality.

== Demographics ==
The village is attested in the 1467/68 Ottoman tax registry (defter) for the Nahiyah of Kırçova. The village had a total of 3 households and 44 households which belonged to the zaim and the timariot.

As of the 2021 census, Srbjani had 518 residents with the following ethnic composition:

- Macedonians 288
- Turks 139
- Albanians 61
- Persons for whom data are taken from administrative sources 28
- Others 2

According to the 2002 census, the village had a total of 495 inhabitants. Ethnic groups in the village include:

- Macedonians 281
- Turks 164
- Albanians 47
- Others 3
