= Tuin, Kičevo =

Tuin Туин Tuhin
- Village
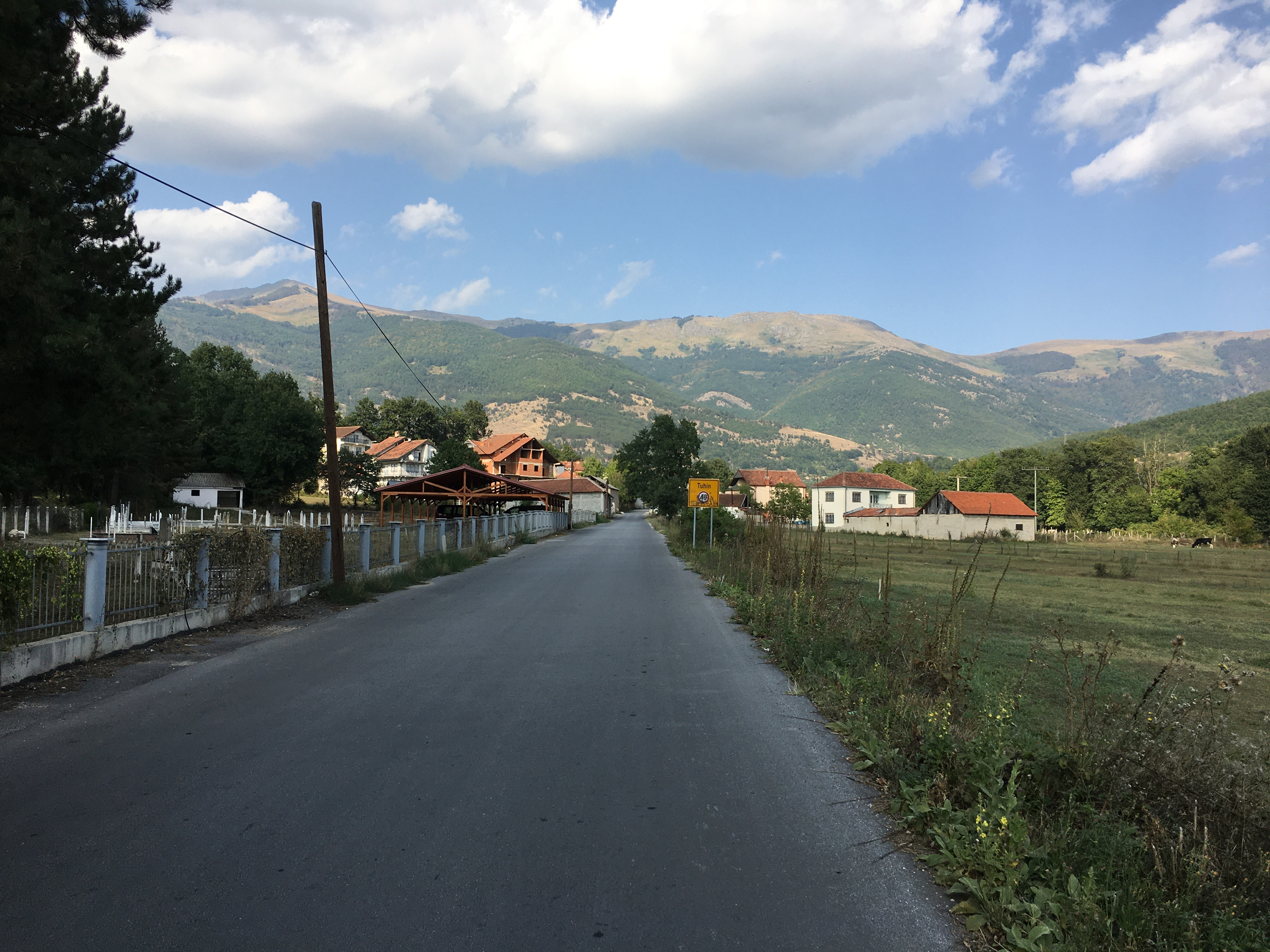
- Entrance of the village

- Location within North Macedonia
- Coordinates: 41°37′N 21°03′E
- Country: North Macedonia
- Region: Southwestern
- Municipality: Kičevo

Population (2021)
  - Total: 784
- Time zone: UTC+1 (CET)
  - Summer (DST): UTC+2 (CEST)
- Car plates: KI
- Website: .

Tuin (Macedonian: Туин, Albanian: Tuhin) is a village in the municipality of Kičevo, North Macedonia. It used to be part of the former municipality of Oslomej.

== History ==
After the capture of the village by Partisan forces in 1944, 49 Albanians were massacred by incoming communist forces and the OZNA.

== Demographics ==
The village is attested in the 1467/68 Ottoman tax registry (defter) for the Nahiyah of Kırçova. The village was divided in two timars, one having 40 and the other 42 houses, excluding bachelors (mucerred).

According to the 1942 Albanian census, Tuin was inhabited by a total of 1094 Muslim Albanians and 233 Bulgarians.

As of the 2021 census, Tuin had 784 residents with the following ethnic composition:

- Albanians 766

According to the 2002 census, the village had a total of 1,476 inhabitants. Ethnic groups in the village include:

- Albanians 1,465
