= Čelopeci, North Macedonia =

Čelopeci
- Village
- Челопеци
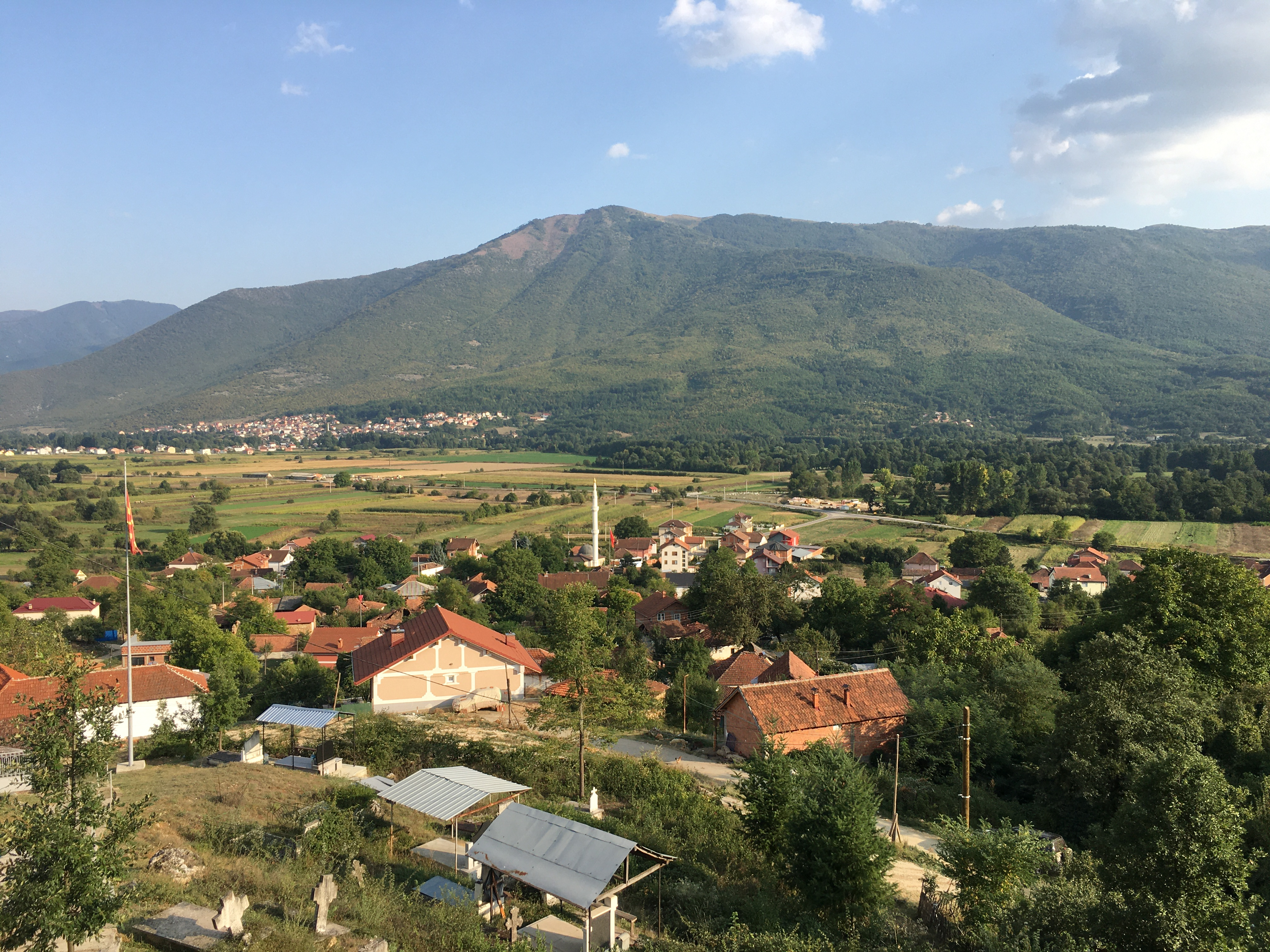
- Panoramic view of the village

- Location within North Macedonia
- Coordinates: 41°28′21″N 21°01′42″E
- Country: North Macedonia
- Region: Southwestern
- Municipality: Kičevo

Population (2002)
  - Total: 318
- Time zone: UTC+1 (CET)
  - Summer (DST): UTC+2 (CEST)
- Car plates: KI
- Website: .

Čelopeci (Macedonian: Челопеци) is a village in the municipality of Kičevo, North Macedonia. It used to be part of the former Vraneštica Municipality.

== Demographics ==
The village is attested in the 1467/68 Ottoman tax registry (defter) for the Nahiyah of Kırçova. The village had a total of 39 houses, excluding bachelors (mucerred).

Čelopeci has traditionally been inhabited by a Torbeš population.

According to the 2002 census, the village had a total of 318 inhabitants. Ethnic groups in the village include:

- Turks 276
- Macedonians 31
- Albanians 10
- Others 1
