= Kolari, Kičevo =

Kolari Колари Kollarё
- Village
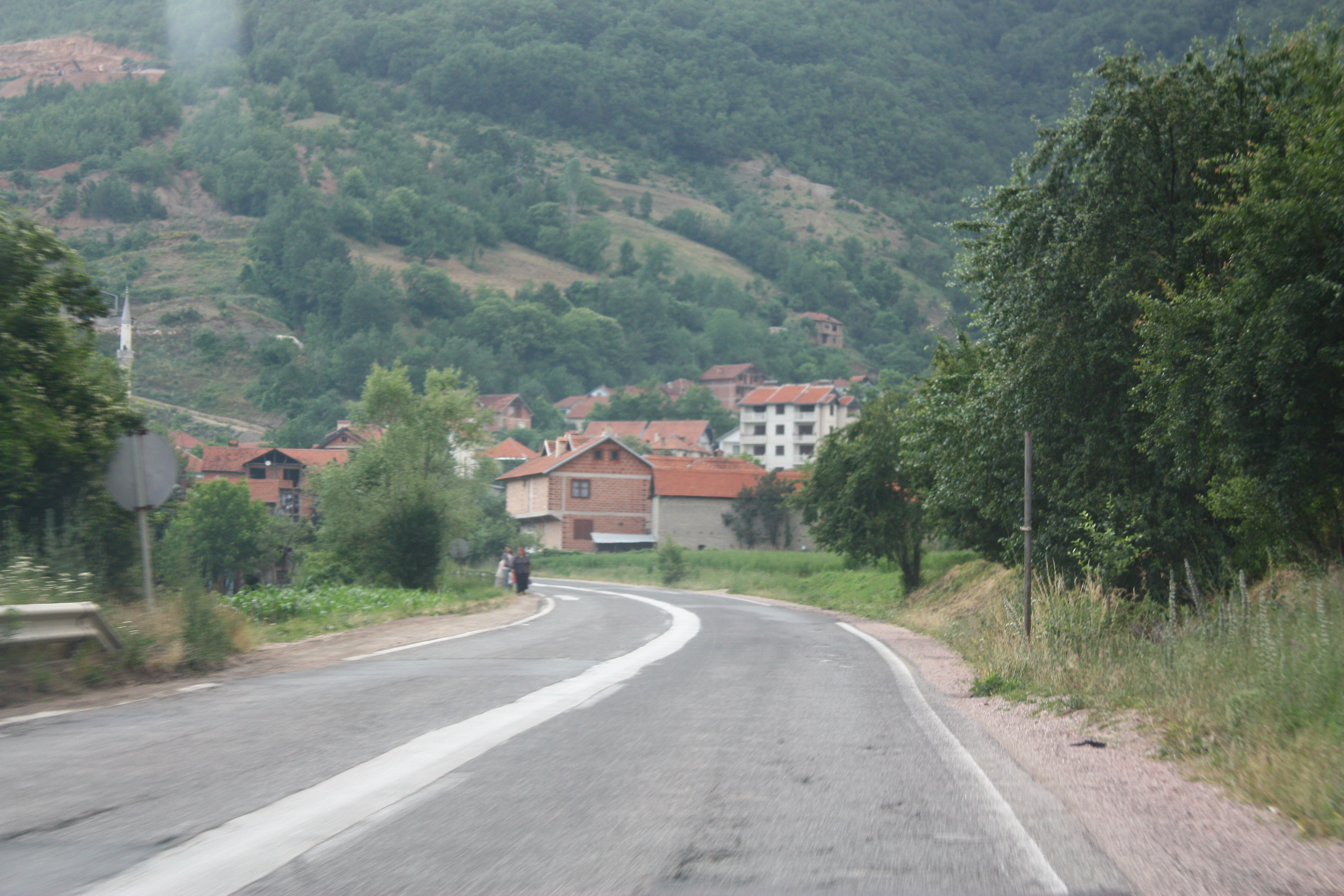
- Road towards Kolari

- Location within North Macedonia
- Coordinates: 41°38′N 20°55′E
- Country: North Macedonia
- Region: Southwestern
- Municipality: Kičevo

Population (2021)
  - Total: 421
- Time zone: UTC+1 (CET)
  - Summer (DST): UTC+2 (CEST)
- Car plates: KI
- Website: .

Kolari (Macedonian: Колари, Albanian: Kollarё) is a village in the municipality of Kičevo, North Macedonia. It used to be part of the former Zajas Municipality.

== History ==
During the period of 1912-1913, members of the Serbian army massacred a total of 7 Albanian men from the village.

== Demographics ==
The village is attested in the 1467/68 Ottoman tax registry (defter) for the Nahiyah of Kırçova. The village had a total of 41 houses, excluding bachelors (mucerred).

As of the 2021 census, Kolari had 421 residents with the following ethnic composition:

- Albanians 388
- Persons for whom data are taken from administrative sources 33

According to the 2002 census, the village had a total of 880 inhabitants. Ethnic groups in the village include:

- Albanians 879
- Macedonians 1
