= Atišta =

- Village
- Атишта
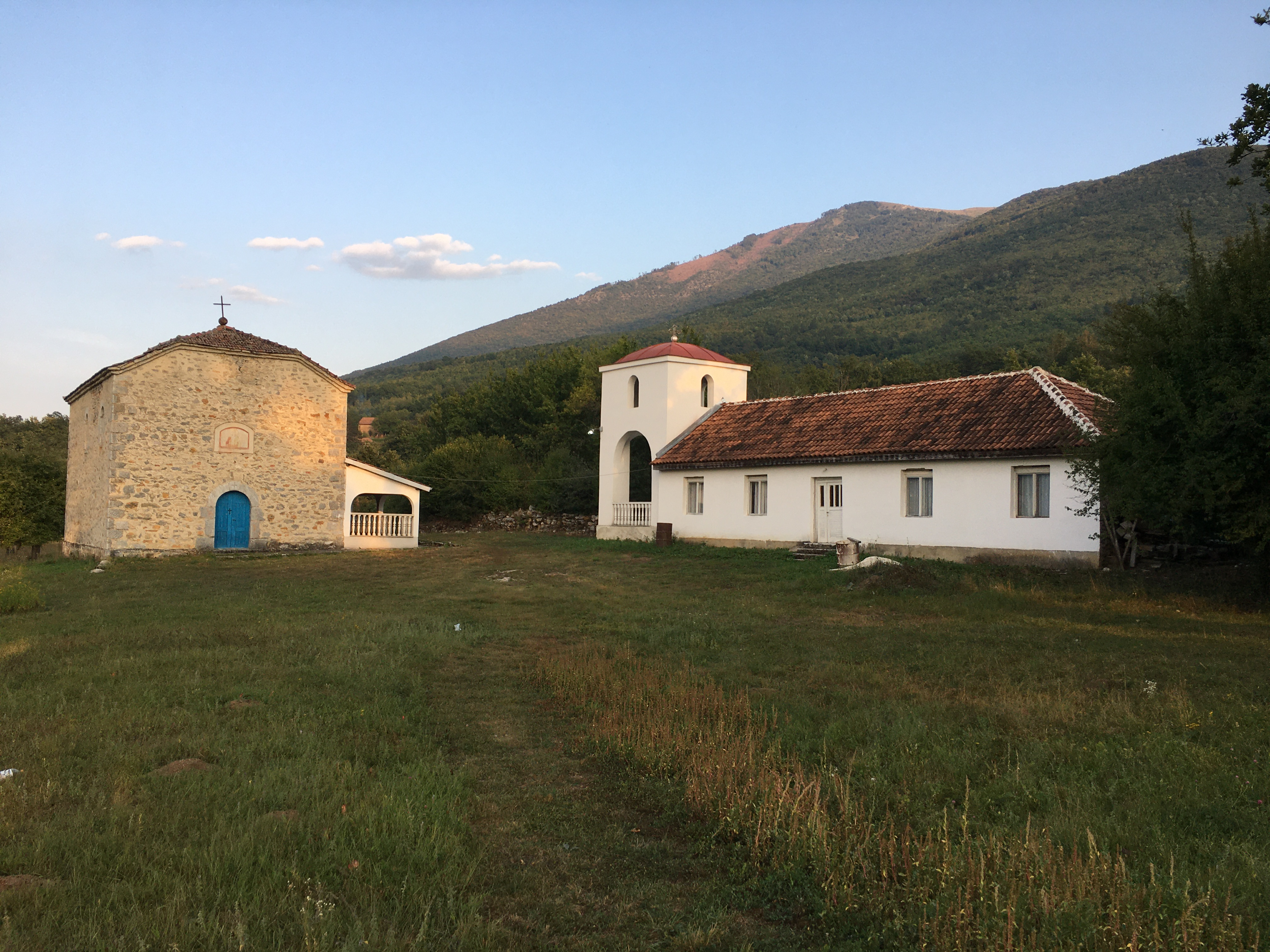
- Church of St. Dimitri, Atišta

- Location within North Macedonia
- Coordinates: 41.4216°N 21.0388°E
- Country: North Macedonia
- Region: Southwestern
- Municipality: Kičevo

Population (2002)
  - Total: 31
- Time zone: UTC+1 (CET)
  - Summer (DST): UTC+2 (CEST)
- Car plates: KI
- Website: .

Atišta (Macedonian: Атишта) is a village in the municipality of Kičevo, North Macedonia. It used to be part of the former Vraneštica Municipality.

== History ==
The village is attested in the 1467/68 Ottoman tax registry (defter) for the Nahiyah of Kırçova. The village had a total of 11 houses, excluding bachelors (mucerred).

The village contains the archaeological site Arbanasi, a village from Late Antiquity. The name is derived from the old South Slavic ethnonym Arbanas, literally meaning Albanian, which suggests either direct linguistic contact with Albanians or the former presence of an Albanian community.

== Demographics ==
According to the 2002 census, the village had a total of 31 inhabitants. Ethnic groups in the village include:

- Macedonians 31

== Culture ==
The main village church, built in 1936, is dedicated to Saint Demetrius.
