= Strelci, Kičevo =

Strelci Стрелци Strellcё
- Village
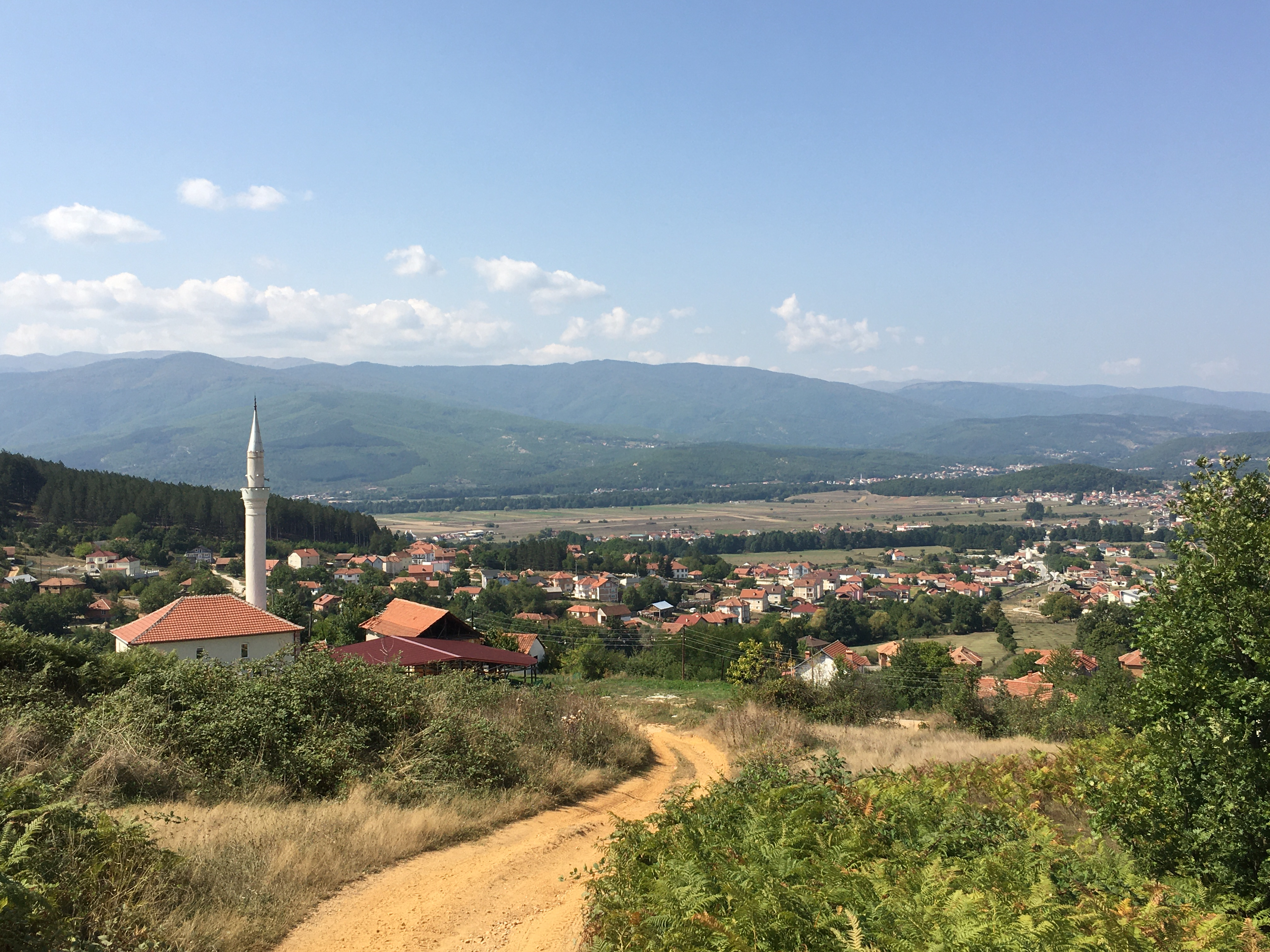
- View of the village

- Location within North Macedonia
- Coordinates: 41°32′N 21°00′E
- Country: North Macedonia
- Region: Southwestern
- Municipality: Kičevo

Population (2021)
  - Total: 1,078
- Time zone: UTC+1 (CET)
  - Summer (DST): UTC+2 (CEST)
- Car plates: KI
- Website: .

Strelci (Macedonian: Стрелци, Albanian: Strellcё) is a village in the municipality of Kičevo, North Macedonia. It used to be part of the former municipality of Oslomej.

== Demographics ==
The village is attested in the 1467/68 Ottoman tax registry (defter) for the Nahiyah of Kırçova. The village had a total of 29 houses, excluding bachelors (mucerred).

According to the 1942 Albanian census, Strelci was inhabited by a total of 599 Muslim Albanians.

As of the 2021 census, Strelci had 1,078 residents with the following ethnic composition:

- Albanians 1,009
- Persons for whom data are taken from administrative sources 67
- Others 2

According to the 2002 census, the village had a total of 1,421 inhabitants. Ethnic groups in the village include:

- Albanians 1,409
- Others 12
