= Rečani =

Rečani (Macedonian: Речани) may refer to:

- Rečani, Zajas, a village in Kičevo Municipality, North Macedonia

== See also ==
- Rečane (disambiguation)
