= Tajmište =

Tajmište Тајмиште
- Village
- Location within North Macedonia
- Coordinates: 41.640385°N 20.858831°E
- Country: North Macedonia
- Region: Southwestern
- Municipality: Kičevo

Population (2002)
  - Total: 107
- Time zone: UTC+1 (CET)
  - Summer (DST): UTC+2 (CEST)
- Car plates: KI
- Website: .

Tajmište (Macedonian: Тајмиште) is a village in the municipality of Kičevo, North Macedonia. It used to be part of the former Zajas Municipality.

== Demographics ==
The village is attested in the 1467/68 Ottoman tax registry (defter) for the Nahiyah of Kırçova. The village had a total of 62 houses, excluding bachelors (mucerred).

According to the 2002 census, the village had a total of 107 inhabitants. Ethnic groups in the village include:

- Macedonians 107
