= Belica, Kičevo =

Belica Белица
- Village
- Location within North Macedonia
- Coordinates: 41.401925°N 20.947570°E
- Country: North Macedonia
- Region: Southwestern
- Municipality: Kičevo

Population (2002)
  - Total: 103
- Time zone: UTC+1 (CET)
  - Summer (DST): UTC+2 (CEST)
- Website: .

Belica (Macedonian: Белица) is a village in the municipality of Kičevo, North Macedonia. It used to be part of the former Drugovo Municipality.

== Geography ==
The village is located in the area of Kopacka region, in the southern part of the territory of the Municipality of Kičevo, on the south side of the Kičevo Valley, whose area rises on the eastern slope of Ilinska Mountain and touches the area of the Municipality of Debarca. The village is hilly, at an altitude of 760 meters. It is 21 kilometers away from the city of Kičevo.

== Demographics ==
The village is attested in the 1467/68 Ottoman tax registry (defter) for the Nahiyah of Kırçova. The village had a total of 69 houses, excluding bachelors (mucerred).

According to the statistics of Vasil Kanchov from 1900, the village of Belica had 750 inhabitants, all Bulgarians. According to the Bulgarian Exarchate Secretary Dimitar Mišev, in 1905 Belica had 824 inhabitants who belonged to the Bulgarian Exarchate. According to the 1942 Albanian census, Belica was inhabited by a total of 913 Bulgarians.

Belica was affected by significant depopulation, as the population decreased from 702 inhabitants in 1961 to 115 inhabitants in 1994, Macedonian population.

According to the 2002 census, the village had a total of 103 inhabitants. Ethnic groups in the village include:

- Macedonians 102
- Others 1

== Culture ==
Every year during the summer, the "Belica's Meetings" are held, an artistic cultural manifestation where people unite through folk music.
