= Ehloec =

Ehlovec
- Location within North Macedonia
- Coordinates: 41°27′34″N 20°45′56″E
- Country: North Macedonia
- Region: Southwestern
- Municipality: Kičevo

Population (2002)
  - Total: 20
- Time zone: UTC+1 (CET)
  - Summer (DST): UTC+2 (CEST)
- Website: .

Ehloec is a village in the municipality of Kičevo, North Macedonia. It was previously part of the Drugovo Municipality. It historically has been identified as a Mijak village.

== Demographics ==
The village is attested in the 1467/68 Ottoman tax registry (defter) for the Nahiyah of Kırçova. The village had a total of 20 houses, excluding bachelors (mucerred). In the 1467/68 Ottoman defter, the village is recorded as having predominantly Albanian anthroponymy, sometimes in conjunction with Slavic ones: such as Vlash, son of Petko,Vlash son of Gjergji etc.

According to the 2002 census, the village had a total of 20 inhabitants. Ethnic groups in the village include:

- Macedonians : 20
