= Strelci =

Strelci may refer to:

- Strelci, Kičevo, North Macedonia
- Strelci, Markovci, Slovenia
