= Papradište =

Papradište may refer to:

- Papradište, Čaška, North Macedonia
- Papradište, Kičevo, North Macedonia
