= Kolari (disambiguation) =

Kolari is a town in Finland. Kolari may also refer to:

- Kolari, Pajala, a small village in Sweden, very near the Finnish Kolari
- Kolari (island), an island in Leningrad Oblast, Russia
- Kolari (Smederevo), a village in Serbia
- Kolari, Kičevo, a village in North Macedonia
- Kolari, Agra, a village in Uttar Pradesh, India
- Kolari, Kerala, a village in Kerala State, India
- Kolari (caste), an Indian caste
