= Mamudovci =

Mamudovci Мамудовци Mafmutaj
- Village
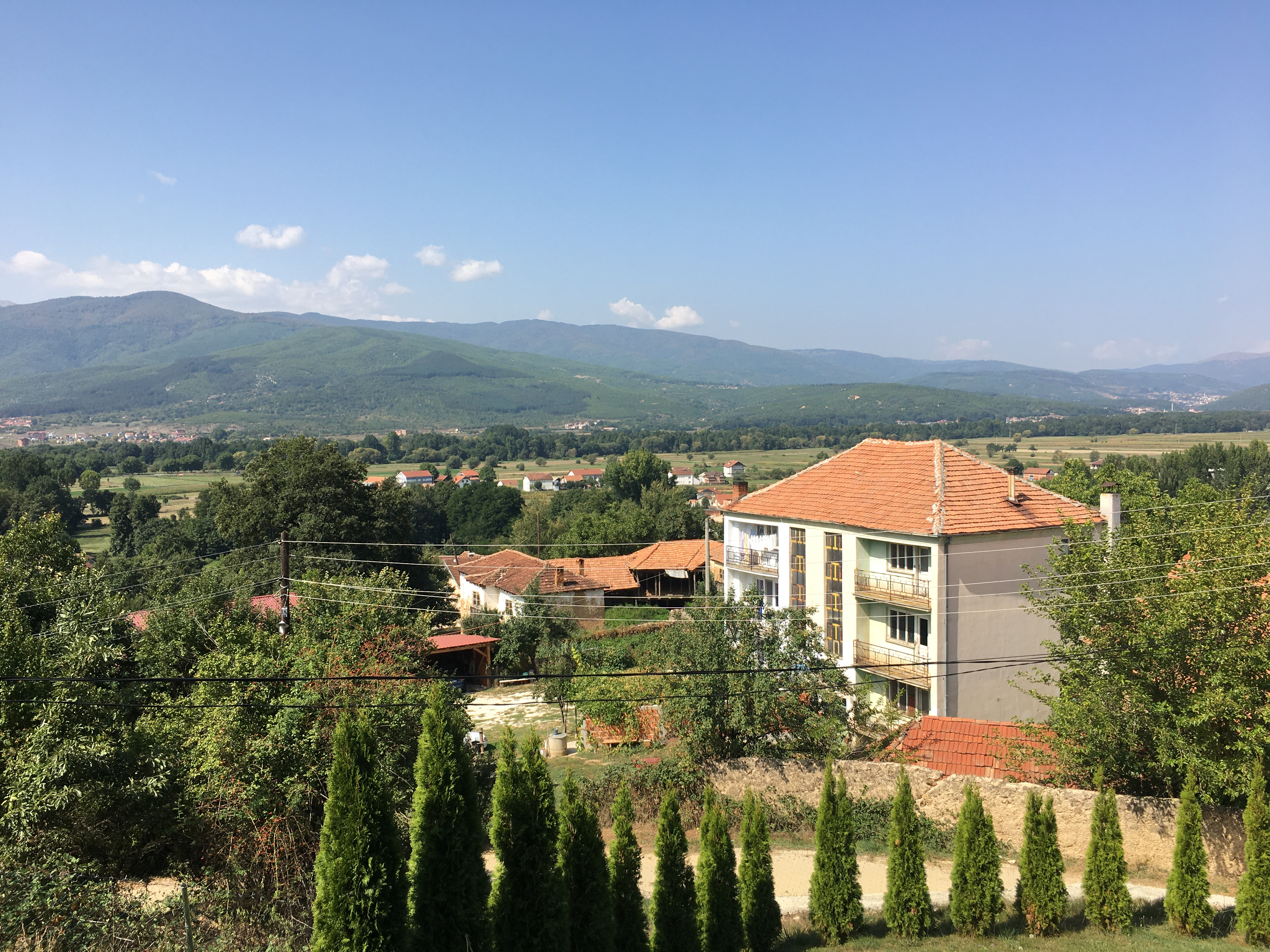
- Houses in the village

- Location within North Macedonia
- Coordinates: 41°32′N 20°59′E
- Country: North Macedonia
- Region: Southwestern
- Municipality: Kičevo

Population (2021)
  - Total: 232
- Time zone: UTC+1 (CET)
  - Summer (DST): UTC+2 (CEST)
- Car plates: KI
- Website: .

Mamudovci (Macedonian: Мамудовци, Albanian: Mafmutaj, Mahmutaj) is a village in the municipality of Kičevo, North Macedonia.

== History ==
During the period of 1912-1913, members the Serbian army massacred a total of 19 Albanian men from the village. The bodies were buried in mass graves.

== Demographics ==
As of the 2021 census, Mamudovci had 232 residents with the following ethnic composition:

- Albanians 228
- Persons for whom data are taken from administrative sources 4

According to the 2002 census, the village had a total of 401 inhabitants. Ethnic groups in the village include:

- Albanians 400
- Macedonians 1

The village is attested in the 1467/68 Ottoman tax registry (defter) for the Nahiyah of Kırçova. The village had a total of 21 houses, excluding bachelors (mucerred).
