= Papradište, Kičevo =

Papradište Папрадиште Prapadisht
- Village
- Location within North Macedonia
- Coordinates: 41°38′53″N 21°01′36″E
- Country: North Macedonia
- Region: Southwestern
- Municipality: Kičevo

Population (2021)
  - Total: 8
- Time zone: UTC+1 (CET)
  - Summer (DST): UTC+2 (CEST)
- Car plates: KI
- Website: .

Papradište (Macedonian: Папрадиште, Albanian: Prapadisht) is a village in the municipality of Kičevo, North Macedonia. It used to be part of the former municipality of Oslomej.

== History ==
During the period of 1912–1913, members the Serbian army massacred a total of 9 Albanian men from the village. The bodies were buried in mass graves. After the capture of the village by Partisan forces in 1944, 11 Albanians were executed by the incoming communist forces.

== Demographics ==
The village is attested in the 1467/68 Ottoman tax registry (defter) for the Nahiyah of Kırçova. The village had a total of 7 houses, excluding bachelors (mucerred).

According to the 1942 Albanian census, Papradište was inhabited by a total of 217 Muslim Albanians.

As of the 2021 census, Papradište had 8 residents with the following ethnic composition:

- Albanians 8

According to the 2002 census, the village had a total of 75 inhabitants. Ethnic groups in the village include:

- Albanians 74
- Others 1
