= Cer, Kičevo =

Cer Цер
- Village
- Location within North Macedonia
- Coordinates: 41°25′01.73″N 21°04′22.88″E
- Country: North Macedonia
- Region: Southwestern
- Municipality: Kičevo

Population (2002)
  - Total: 159
- Time zone: UTC+1 (CET)
  - Summer (DST): UTC+2 (CEST)
- Postal code: 6245
- Area code: 045
- Car plates: KI
- Website: .

Cer (Macedonian: Цер) is a village in the municipality of Kičevo, North Macedonia. It used to be part of the former Drugovo Municipality.

== Geography ==
The settlement of Cer is located in the western part of North Macedonia.The settlement is 36 km south of the nearest larger city, Kičevo.

Cer is one of the villages that border the upper part of Demir Hisar Municipality, along with sh:Malo Cersko and the larger sh:Golemo Cersko to its west, which is in the basin of the river Treska. The village is located on the southern slopes of the Baba Sach mountain, while the Bush mountain rises to the east. The village is in the basin of the small Belichka River, which flows into the Treska River in the north. The altitude of the settlement is approximately 1,020 meters.

The climate in the village is mountainous due to the significant altitude.

== Demographics ==
According to the 2002 census, the village had a total of 159 inhabitants. Ethnic groups in the village include:

- 158 Macedonians
- 1 Serb

The village is attested in the 1467/68 Ottoman tax registry (defter) for the Nahiyah of Kırçova. The village had a total of 5 houses, excluding bachelors (mucerred).
