= S'lp, Kičevo =

S'lp С’лп Sop
- Village
- Location within North Macedonia
- Coordinates: 41.4131600°N 21.0202100°E
- Country: North Macedonia
- Region: Southwestern
- Municipality: Kičevo
- Time zone: UTC+1 (CET)
  - Summer (DST): UTC+2 (CEST)
- Website: .

S'lp (Macedonian: С’лп, Albanian: Sop) is a historical village in the municipality of Kičevo, North Macedonia.

== History ==
The village is attested in the 1467/68 Ottoman tax registry (defter) for the Nahiyah of Kırçova. The village had a total of 20 houses, excluding bachelors (mucerred).

73 Albanians of Sop were killed by Serbian soldiers. The village was razed to the ground, and its land reallocated to neighboring settlements.

== Demographics ==
In statistics gathered by Vasil Kanchov in 1900, the village of S'lp was inhabited by 220 Muslim Albanians.
