= Staroec =

- Village
- Староец
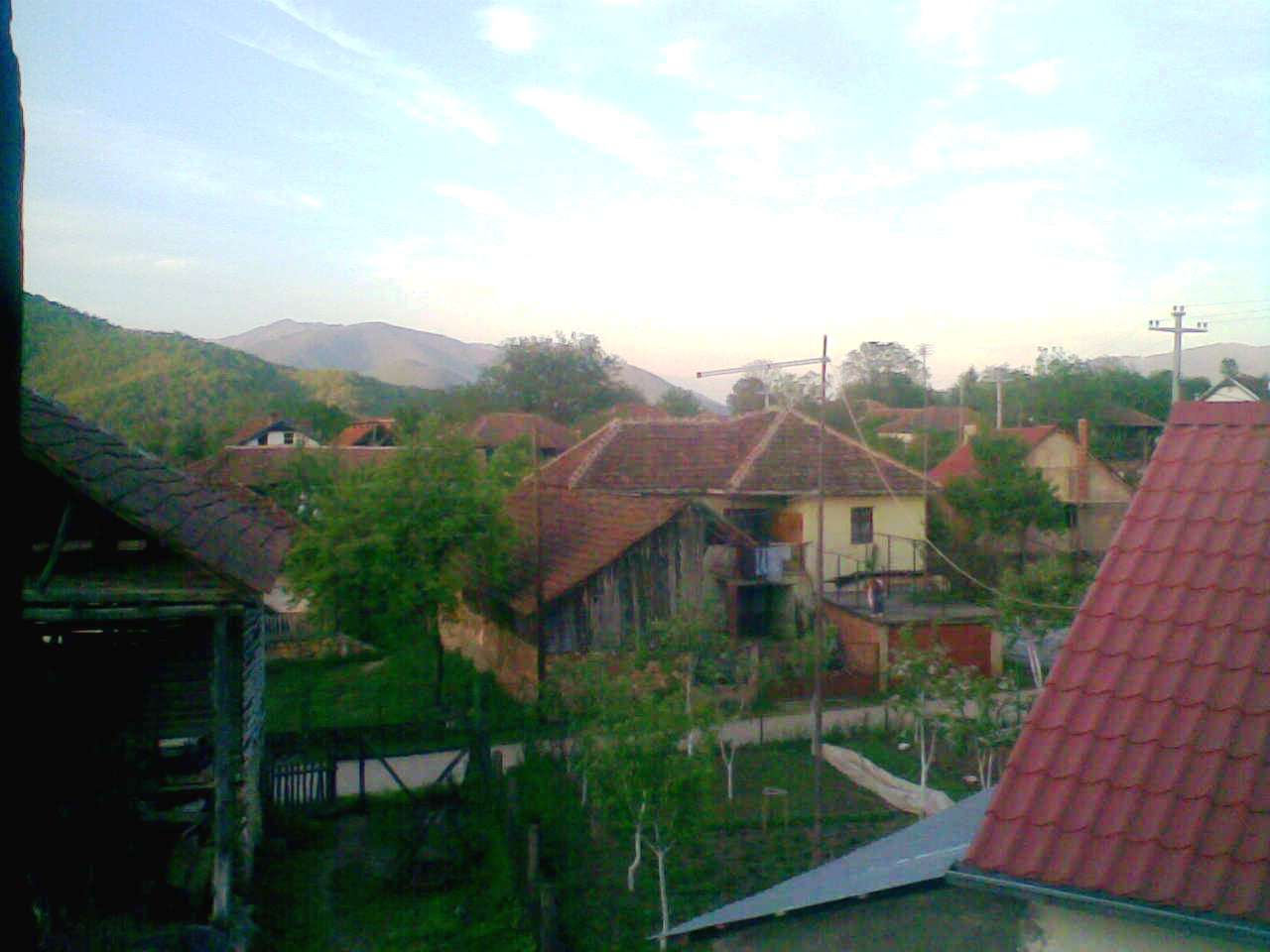

- Location within North Macedonia
- Coordinates: 41°27′42″N 21°03′20″E
- Country: North Macedonia
- Region: Southwestern
- Municipality: Kičevo

Population (2002)
  - Total: 195
- Time zone: UTC+1 (CET)
  - Summer (DST): UTC+2 (CEST)
- Car plates: KI
- Website: .

Staroec (Macedonian: Староец) is a village in the municipality of Kičevo, North Macedonia. It used to be part of the former Vraneštica Municipality.

== Demographics ==
The village is attested in the 1467/68 Ottoman tax registry (defter) for the Nahiyah of Kırçova. The village had a total of 45 houses, excluding bachelors (mucerred).

According to the 2002 census, the village had a total of 195 inhabitants. Ethnic groups in the village include:

- Macedonians 194
- Serbs 1
