= House of Kire Tomovski =

Historical house in Galičnik

- Куќа на Кире Томовски; Kukja na Kire Tomovski (Macedonian)
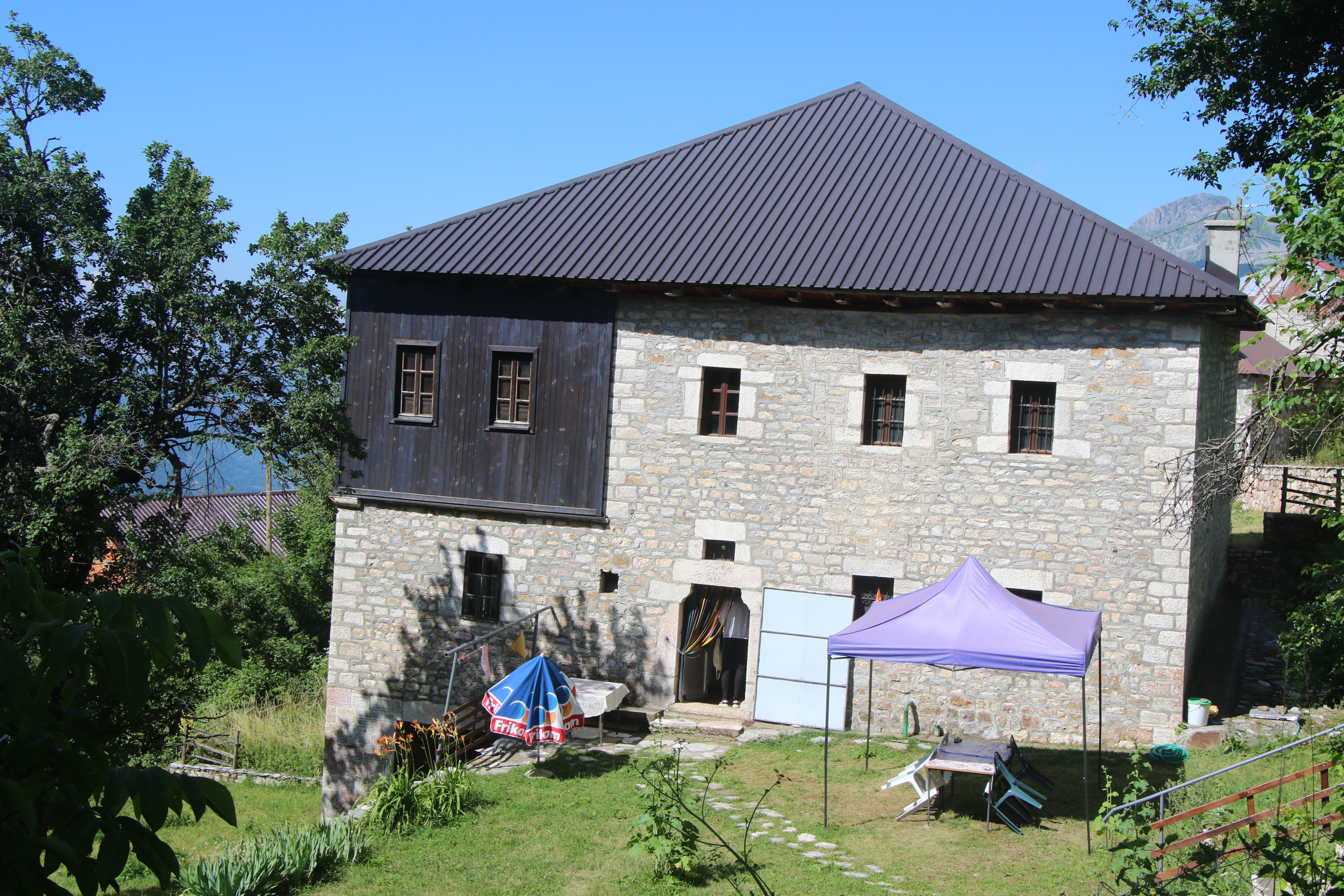
- Interactive map of House of Kire Tomovski
- 41°35′40.32″N 20°39′20.71″E
- Type: House
- Location: Galičnik, North Macedonia

Site notes
- Governing body: Office for Protection of Cultural Heritage, Ministry of Culture
- Owner: Tomovski family

The House of Kire Tomovski is a historical house in Galičnik that is listed as Cultural heritage of North Macedonia. It is in ownership of one branch of the family of Tomovski.

== Family history ==
The former surname of Tomovski is Pardovski/Pardovci. Before they inhabited Galičnik in 1774, they lived in the Miyak village of Osoj.

The family of Tomovski has shared ancestry with the families of Gjinovski, Markovski and Ugrinovski.

=== Members of the family ===
- Pardo Pardovski - local magnate and sheep owner. He is the one who brought its family to Galičnik.
- Pejčin Pardovski (Tomovski) - son of Pardo, born 1764.
- Tomo Pardovski (Tomovski) - son of Pejčin; the surname Tomovski originates from Tomo. He was one of the biggest landowners and sheepowners (kjeaja). He was killed in 1856 in the mountain vicinity of the village of Gari, on the way that leads to Kičevo.
- Marko Pardovski - son of Pejčin and brother of Tomo; His descendants bear the surname Markovski after him.
- Todor Tomoski - son of Tomo - son of Tomo. He was vice president of Miyak Christian Sect - a local church organization that tended to oppose the Greek and Bulgarian propaganda in Macedonia, particular in the Miyak region.
- Rafail "Rafe" Tomoski - son of Todor. He was killed by Albanian bandits, during grazing of his 4000 sheep who were stolen afterwards.
- Pejčin Tomovski - president of the local Peoples Liberation Committee during WWII.
