= Rečani, Zajas =

Rečani Речани Reçan
- Village
- Location within North Macedonia
- Coordinates: 41°35′13″N 20°54′54″E
- Country: North Macedonia
- Region: Southwestern
- Municipality: Kičevo

Population (2021)
  - Total: 48
- Time zone: UTC+1 (CET)
  - Summer (DST): UTC+2 (CEST)
- Car plates: KI
- Website: .

Rečani (Macedonian: Речани; Albanian: Reçan) is a village in the municipality of Kičevo, North Macedonia. It used to be part of the former Zajas Municipality.

== Demographics ==
As of the 2021 census, Rečani had 48 residents with the following ethnic composition:

- Albanians 46
- Turks 1
- Persons for whom data are taken from administrative sources 1

According to the 2002 census, the village had a total of 101 inhabitants. Ethnic groups in the village include:

- Albanians 100
- Others 1

According to the 1942 Albanian census, Rečani was inhabited by a total of 70 Muslim Albanians.
