= Patec =

- Village
- Патец
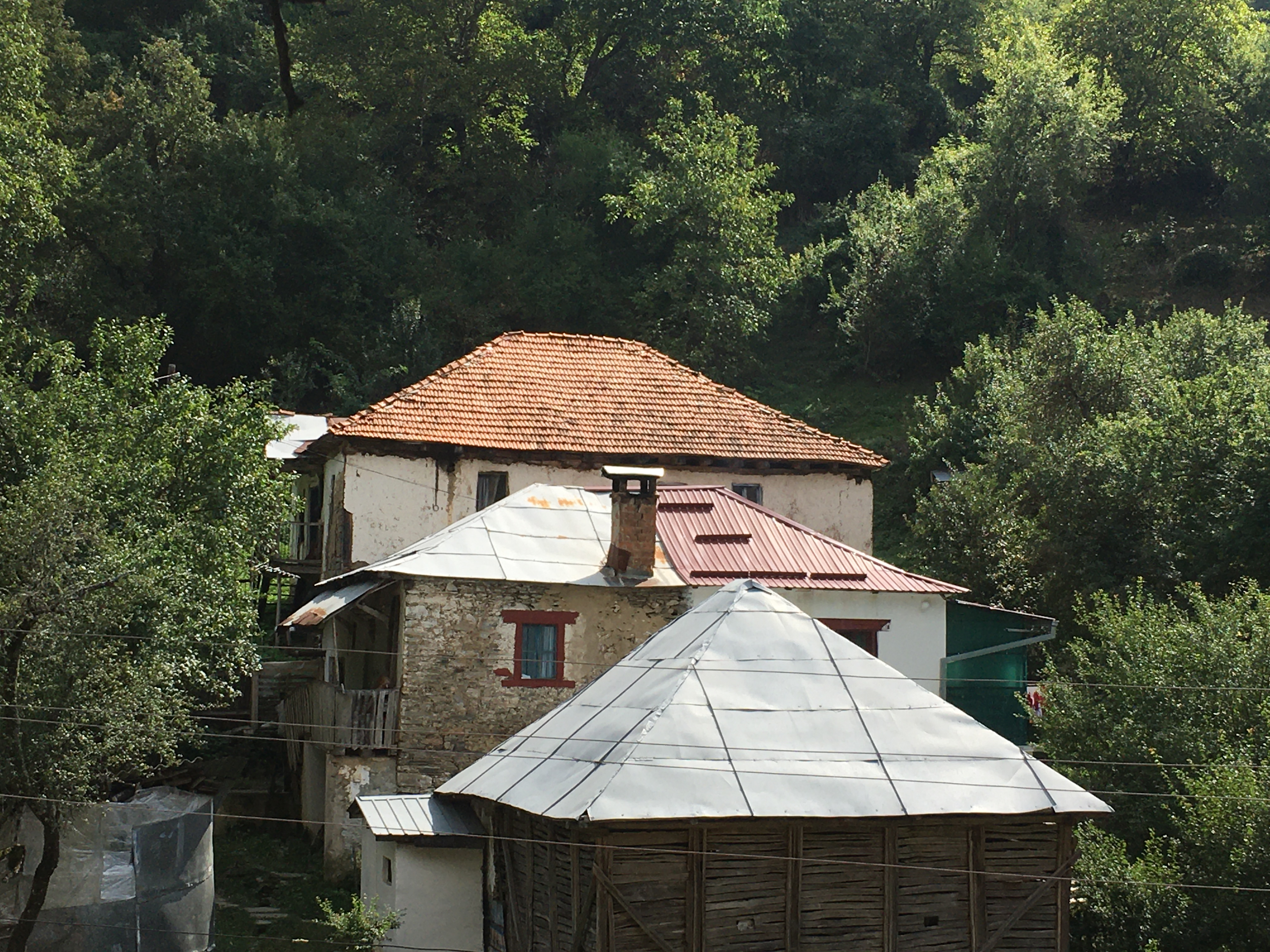

- Location within North Macedonia
- Coordinates: 41.5422°N 21.1122°E
- Country: North Macedonia
- Region: Southwestern
- Municipality: Kičevo

Population (2002)
  - Total: 8
- Time zone: UTC+1 (CET)
  - Summer (DST): UTC+2 (CEST)
- Car plates: KI
- Website: .

Patec (Macedonian: Патец) is a village in the municipality of Kičevo, North Macedonia. It used to be part of the former Vraneštica Municipality.

== History ==
Although the village is populated by an Orthodox Macedonian population, archaeological traces of "Latin graves" found in the settlement suggest the former presence of a Catholic Albanian community. The term Latini, is an archaic term used by Slavic and Aromanian Orthodox communities to refer to Catholic Albanians.

The village is attested in the 1467/68 Ottoman tax registry (defter) for the Nahiyah of Kırçova. The village had a total of 8 houses.

== Demographics ==
According to the 2002 census, the village had a total of 8 inhabitants. Ethnic groups in the village include:

- Macedonians 8
