= Rečane =

Rečane (Cyrillic: Речане) may refer to:

- Rečane, Suva Reka, a village in Suva Reka Municipality
- Rečane, Gostivar, a village in Gostivar Municipality, North Macedonia

== See also ==
- Rečani (disambiguation)
