= Osoj =

- Village
- Осој
- Location within North Macedonia
- Coordinates: 41°31′44″N 20°55′53″E
- Country: North Macedonia
- Region: Southwestern
- Municipality: Kičevo

Population (2002)
  - Total: 593
- Time zone: UTC+1 (CET)
  - Summer (DST): UTC+2 (CEST)
- Car plates: KI
- Website: .

Osoj (Macedonian: Осој) is a village in the municipality of Kičevo, North Macedonia.

== Etymology ==
Toponym derives from Proto-Slavic *osojь, meaning a shady place.

== Demographics ==
In 1873, the village had 12 Orthodox Christian households with 36 people. In 1900, the village had 250 Orthodox Christian inhabitants. In 1905, the village had 240 Bulgarian Exarchists.

According to the 1942 Fascist Albanian census, Osoj was inhabited by a total of 229 Bulgarians and 53 Serbophone Orthodox Albanians.

According to the 2002 census, the village had a total of 593 inhabitants. Ethnic groups in the village include:

- Macedonians – 397
- Romani – 169
- Albanians – 67
- Serbs – 2
- Others – 28

As of the 2021 census, Osoj had 410 residents with the following ethnic composition:

- Macedonians 142
- Albanians 27
- Roma 199
- Others 1
- Persons for whom data are taken from administrative sources 41
