= Raštani, Kičevo =

Raštani Раштани Rashtan
- Village
- Location within North Macedonia
- Coordinates: 41°32′21″N 20°56′31″E
- Country: North Macedonia
- Region: Southwestern
- Municipality: Kičevo

Population (2002)
  - Total: 1,063
- Time zone: UTC+1 (CET)
  - Summer (DST): UTC+2 (CEST)
- Car plates: KI
- Website: .

Raštani (Macedonian: Раштани, Albanian: Rashtani), is a village in the municipality of Kičevo, North Macedonia.

== Demographics ==
The village is attested in the 1467/68 Ottoman tax registry (defter) for the Nahiyah of Kırçova. The village had a total of 18 houses, excluding bachelors (mucerred).

According to the 1942 Albanian census, Raštaniwas inhabited by a total of 327 Bulgarians and 93 Serbophone Orthodox Albanians.

According to the 2002 census, the village had a total of 1063 inhabitants. Ethnic groups in the village include:

- Macedonians 679
- Albanians 198
- Romani 132
- Turks 24
- Vlachs 1
- Serbs 2
- Others 27

As of the 2021 census, Raštani had 236 residents with the following ethnic composition:

- Macedonians 133
- Albanians 69
- Romani 27
- Serbs 4
- Persons for whom data are taken from administrative sources 3
