= Kičevo Municipality =

Municipality of North Macedonia

Coordinates: 41.51°N 20.97°E

Municipality of Kičevo Општина Кичево Komuna e Kërçovës
- Urban municipality
- Coat of arms

- Location within North Macedonia
- Country: North Macedonia
- Region: Southwestern
- Municipal seat: Kičevo

Government
  - Mayor: Aleksandar Jovanovski (VMRO-DPMNE)

Area
  - Total: 838 km^{2} (324 sq mi)

Population
  - Total: 39,669
- Time zone: UTC+1 (CET)
- Vehicle registration: KI
- Website: Official website

Kičevo Municipality (Macedonian: Кичево; Albanian: Kërçovë) is a municipality in the western part of North Macedonia. The municipal seat is the city of Kičevo. Kičevo Municipality is located in the Southwestern Statistical Region.

== Geography ==
The municipality borders Mavrovo and Rostuša Municipality to the northwest, Debar Municipality to the west, Gostivar Municipality to the north, Makedonski Brod and Plasnica municipalities to the east, Demir Hisar Municipality to the south, and Debarca Municipality to the southwest.

== Demographics ==
=== Prior to 2013 adjustment ===
According to the last national census from 2002 the municipality, prior to territorial adjustments in 2013, had 30,138 inhabitants. Ethnic groups in the municipality included:

- Macedonians = 16,140 (53.6%)
- Albanians = 9,202 (30.5%)
- Turks = 2,430 (8.1%)
- Roma = 1,630 (5.4%)
- others.

=== Post-2013 ===
Following the territorial adjustments in March 2013, the municipalities of Drugovo, Vraneštica, Zajas and Oslomej have been combined with Kičevo Municipality. Ethnic groups in the larger Kičevo Municipality, according to the 2002 and 2021 censuses include:

	2002		2021	
	Number	%	Number	%
TOTAL	56,734	100	39,669	100
Albanians	30,927	54.51	16,373	41.27
Macedonians	20,278	35.74	16,020	40.38
Turks	2,998	5.28	2,553	6.44
Roma	1,631	2.87	2,003	5.05
Vlachs	76	0.13	70	0.18
Serbs	102	0.18	60	0.15
Bosniaks	8	0.03	13	0.03
Other / Undeclared / Unknown	714	1.26	172	0.44
Persons for whom data are taken from administrative sources			2,405	6.06

Mother tongues among the residents of Kičevo Municipality include:

- Macedonian: 18,520 (46.7%)
- Albanian: 16,351 (41.2%)
- Persons for whom data are taken from administrative sources: 2,405 (6.1%)
- Turkish: 1,905 (4.8%)
- Romani: 375 (1.0%)
- Others: 113 (0.3%)

== Inhabited places ==
There are 88 inhabited places in this municipality.

Inhabited Places	Total	Macedonians	Albanians	Turks	Roma	Vlachs	Serbs	Bosnians	Others
Kičevo Municipality	39,669	16,020	16,373	2,553	2,003	70	60	8	2,577
Kičevo	23428	12687	5110	2069	1775	67	49	8	1663
Knežino	15	14	0	0	0	0	0	0	1
Lazarovci	90	50	35	0	0	0	1	0	4
Mamudovci	232	0	228	0	0	0	0	0	4
Osoj	410	142	27	0	199	0	0	1	41
Raštani	236	133	69	0	27	0	4	0	3
Trapčin Dol	357	1	339	0	0	0	0	0	17
Arangel	292	0	278	0	0	0	1	0	13
Atišta	15	15	0	0	0	0	0	0	0
Bačišta	470	0	443	0	2	0	0	0	25
Belica	54	52	0	0	0	0	0	0	2
Berikovo	34	0	30	0	0	0	0	0	4
Bigor Dolenci	114	110	0	0	0	0	0	0	4
Brždani	85	54	0	0	0	0	1	0	30
Bukojčani	25	8	14	0	0	0	0	0	3
Vidrani	15	15	0	0	0	0	0	0	0
Vraneštica	329	313	0	0	0	0	0	0	16
Garani	27	0	17	0	0	0	0	0	10
Golemo Crsko	0	0	0	0	0	0	0	0	0
Gorna Dušegubica	9	9	0	0	0	0	0	0	0
Gorno Dobrenoec	30	24	0	0	0	0	0	1	5
Gorno Strogomište	699	0	611	0	0	0	0	0	88
Grešnica	789	0	764	0	0	1	0	0	24
Dlapkin Dol	388	0	368	0	0	0	0	0	20
Dolna Dušegubica	3	3	0	0	0	0	0	0	0
Dolno Dobrenoec	23	16	0	0	0	0	0	0	7
Dolno Strogomište	355	0	337	0	0	0	0	0	18
Drugovo	1545	1276	81	122	0	2	2	0	60
Dupjani	1	1	0	0	0	0	0	0	0
Ehloec	9	9	0	0	0	0	0	0	0
Zhubrino	203	0	198	0	0	0	0	0	5
Zajas	2567	1	2449	0	0	0	0	0	117
Ivanchishta	6	3	0	0	0	0	0	0	3
Izvor	11	10	0	0	0	0	0	1	0
Javorec	1	1	0	0	0	0	0	0	0
Jagol	215	5	202	0	0	0	0	0	8
Jagol Dolenci	2	2	0	0	0	0	0	0	0
Judovo	6	6	0	0	0	0	0	0	0
Karbunica	29	26	0	0	0	0	1	0	2
Kladnik	12	12	0	0	0	0	0	0	0
Klenoec	20	19	0	0	0	0	0	0	1
Kozica	45	40	0	0	0	0	0	0	5
Kozichini	1	1	0	0	0	0	0	0	0
Kolari	421	0	388	0	0	0	0	0	33
Kolibari	355	0	338	0	0	0	0	0	17
Krushica	0	0	0	0	0	0	0	0	0
Lavchani	4	4	0	0	0	0	0	0	0
Lešnica	95	20	70	0	0	0	0	0	5
Malkoec	9	7	0	0	0	0	1	0	1
Malo Crsko	6	6	0	0	0	0	0	0	0
Manastirsko Dolenci	40	24	0	0	0	0	0	0	16
Midinci	60	25	28	0	0	0	0	1	6
Miokazi	19	18	0	0	0	0	0	0	1
Novo Selo	38	1	36	0	0	0	0	0	1
Orlanci	17	14	0	0	0	0	0	0	3
Oslomej	21	21	0	0	0	0	0	0	0
Papradište	8	0	8	0	0	0	0	0	0
Patec	3	3	0	0	0	0	0	0	0
Podvis	55	53	0	0	0	0	0	0	2
Popovjani	142	1	135	0	0	0	0	0	6
Popoec	10	10	0	0	0	0	0	0	0
Popolzhani	115	114	0	0	0	0	0	1	0
Premka	77	6	71	0	0	0	0	0	0
Prostranje	19	17	0	0	0	0	0	0	2
Rabetino	5	4	0	0	0	0	0	0	1
Rechani Zajas	48	0	46	1	0	0	0	0	1
Rechani, Chelopechko	14	14	0	0	0	0	0	0	0
Svetorache	9	9	0	0	0	0	0	0	0
Svinjishte	38	37	0	0	0	0	0	0	1
Srbica	796	0	761	0	0	0	0	0	35
Srbjani	518	288	61	139	0	0	1	0	28
Staroec	160	152	0	0	0	0	0	0	8
Strelci	1078	0	1009	1	0	0	0	0	67
Tajmište	59	53	0	0	0	0	0	0	6
Tuin	784	3	766	0	0	0	0	0	15
Cer	60	49	0	0	0	0	0	0	11
Crvivci	705	0	671	0	0	0	0	0	34
Čelopeci	287	9	9	221	0	0	0	3	45
Shutovo	397	0	376	0	0	0	0	0	21

== History ==
On 26 November 2019, an earthquake struck Albania and Kičevo Municipality sent €12,000 for relief efforts.
