= Oslomej Municipality =

Former municipality of Macedonia

Coordinates: 41.55°N 20.98°E

Oslomej Municipality Општина Осломеј Komuna e Osllomejit
- Municipality
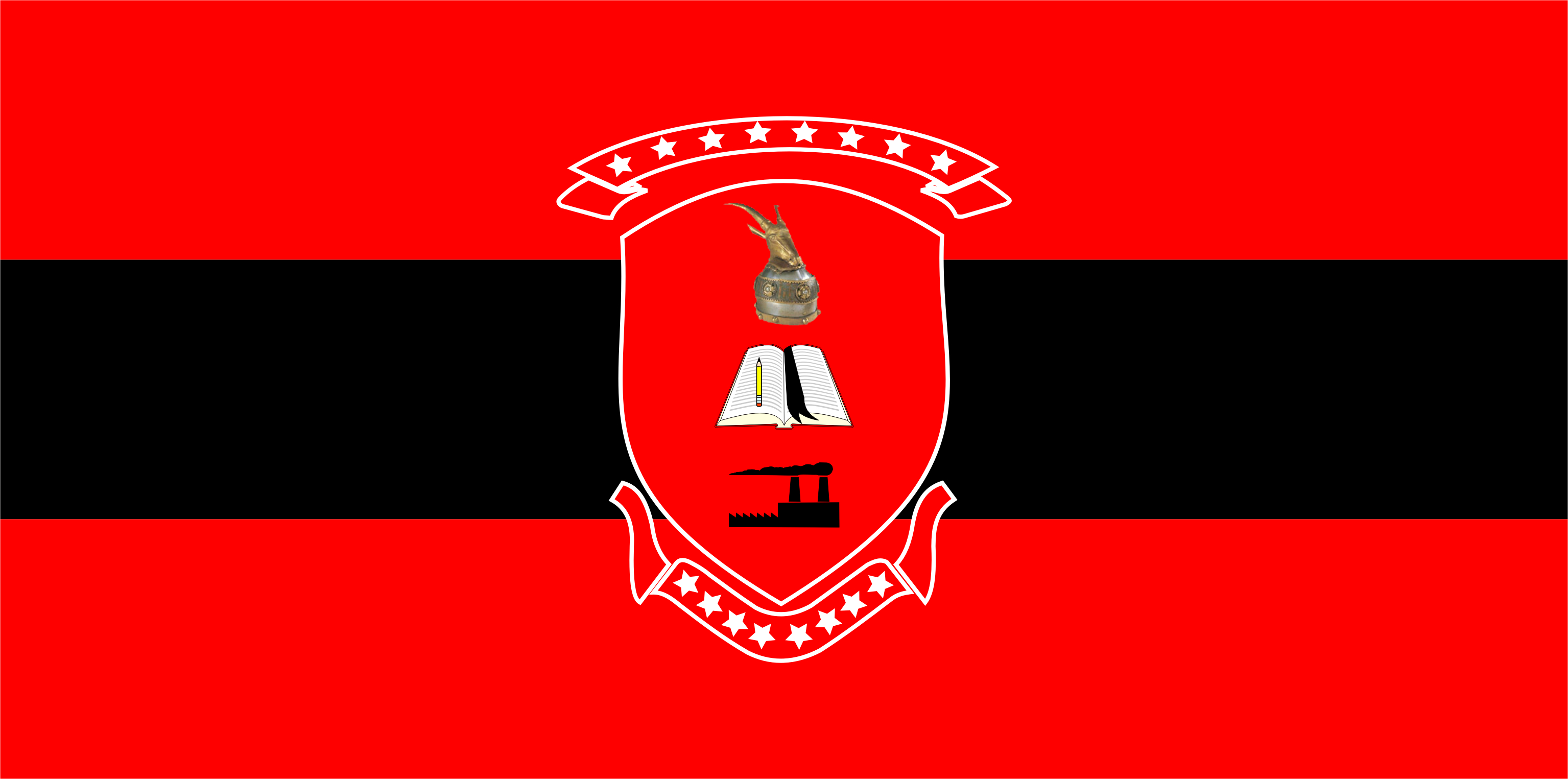
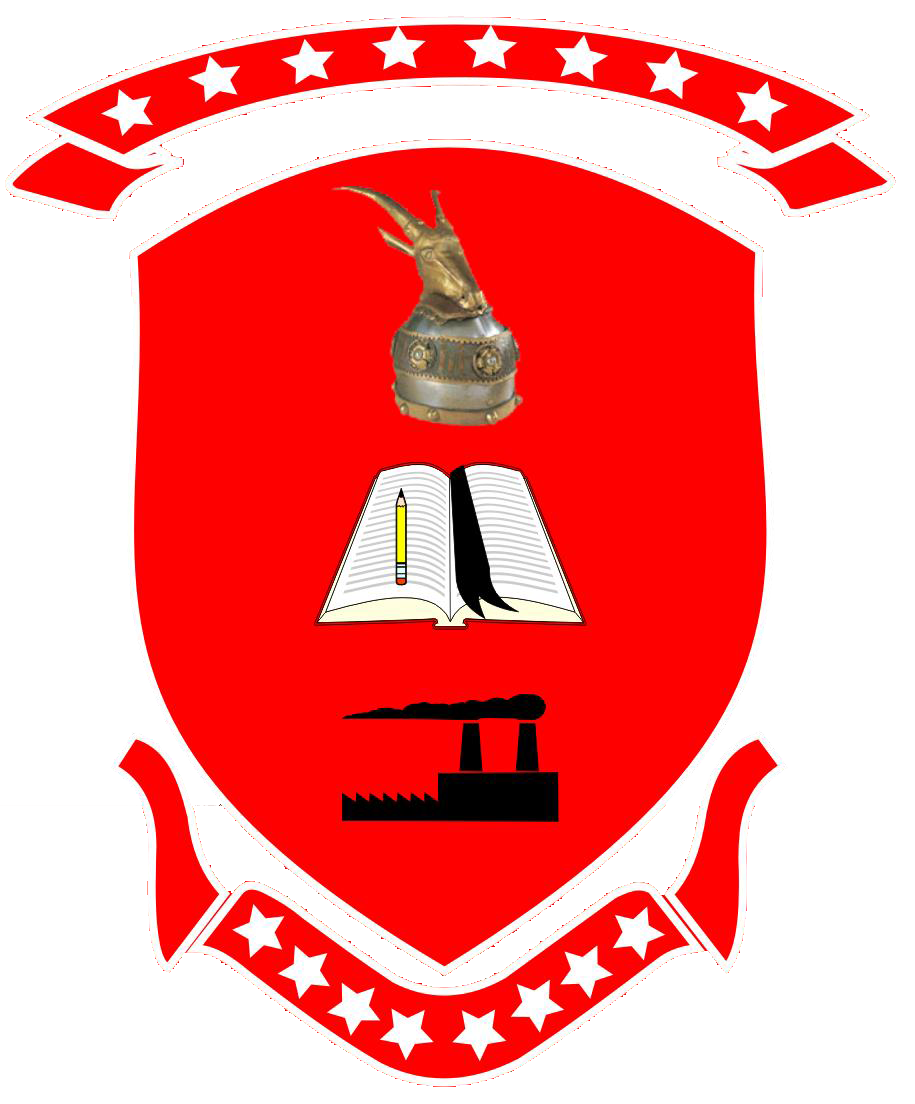
- Flag Seal

- Country: Republic of North Macedonia
- region: Southwestern Statistical Region
- Municipal seat: Oslomej

Population
  - Total: 10,420
- Time zone: UTC+1 (CET)
- Split from: Kičevo Municipality in 1996
- Merged into: Kičevo Municipality in 2013

Oslomej (Macedonian: Осломеј, Albanian: Osllomej) is a former municipality in western Republic of North Macedonia, created in 1996 territorial organisation and dissolved following the 2013 Macedonian new territorial organisation, after it was merged with Kičevo Municipality.

- Oslomej is also the name of the village where the municipal seat was found.
  - Oslomej Municipality was part of the Southwestern Statistical Region.

== Geography ==
The municipality bordered

- Makedonski Brod Municipality to the east,
- Vraneštica Municipality to the south,
- Kičevo Municipality to the southwest,
- Zajas Municipality to the west, and
- Gostivar Municipality to the north.

== Demographics ==
According to the last national census from 2002, this municipality has 10,420 inhabitants.

- Ethnic groups in the municipality include:
  - Albanians = 10,252 (98.4%)
  - Macedonians = 110 (1.1%)
  - others = 58 (0.6%)

The total number of students in the municipality in 2011, in comparison to the total number of students in 2007, declined for 36.8%. Oslomej is the first municipality in North Macedonia by the decline of the total number of students.
