= Mihailo Josifović =

Serbian military commander

Mihailo Josifović (Serbian: Михаило Јосифовић) also known as Vojvode Mikajle (Brod, Ottoman Empire, 1880 - Brod, Kingdom of Yugoslavia, April 1941) was a Serbian Chetnik voivode in Old Serbia during the time of the Macedonian struggle in the early part of 20th century.

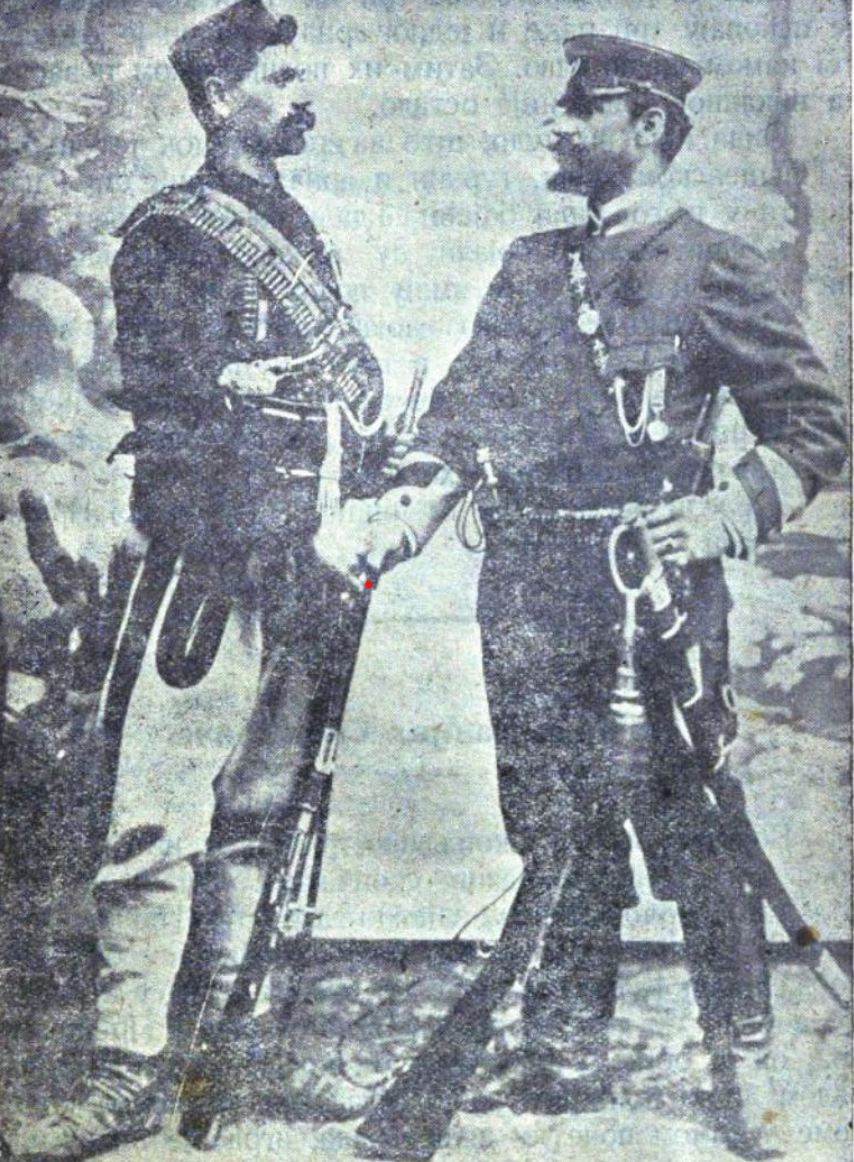
Mihailo Josifović and Micko Krstić

== Biography ==
Josifović was born in the village of Makedonski Brod in Poreče. He joined the Serbian Chetnik Organization in 1905 under the command of Rade Radivojević-Dušan. After the death of his commander in 1907, Mihailo Josifović served as voivode in 1908 until the Young Turk Revolution. From 1911 he was acting as the commander in Poreč with a nominal salary of three Turkish liras per month. When the Second Balkan War broke out in 1913, he fought in Kičevo along with Vasilije Trbić, Boško Virjanac, Jovan Dolgač, and Dane Stojanović. After the war, he acquired 10 hectares of land in Makedonski Brod where he settled down to raise a family.

== Death ==
Vojvode Mikajle was killed in Brod in April 1941.

== See also ==
- List of Chetnik voivodes
