= Drugovo Municipality =

Former municipality of Macedonia

Coordinates: 41.48°N 20.91°E

Drugovo Municipality Општина Другово
- Former Municipality
- Flag Coat of arms

- Country: North Macedonia
- region: Southwestern Statistical Region
- Municipal seat: Drugovo

Population
  - Total: 3,249
- Time zone: UTC+1 (CET)
- Split from: Kičevo Municipality in 1996
- Merged into: Kičevo Municipality in 2013

Drugovo (Macedonian: Другово) is a former municipality in western North Macedonia, created in the 1996 territorial organisation and dissolved following the 2013 Macedonian new territorial organisation, after it was merged with Kičevo Municipality.

- Drugovo is also the name of the village where the municipal seat was found.
  - Drugovo Municipality was part of the Southwestern Statistical Region.
    - The last mayor of the municipality was Dobre Nikoski.

== Geography ==
The municipality bordered

- Debar Municipality to the west,
- Mavrovo and Rostuša Municipality to the northwest,
- Zajas Municipality to the northeast,
- Kičevo Municipality, Vraneštica Municipality, Plasnica Municipality, and Kruševo Municipality to the east,
- Demir Hisar Municipality to the southeast, and
- Debarca Municipality to the southwest.

== Demographics ==
According to the last national census from 2002, Drugovo Municipality has 3,249 inhabitants.

- Ethnic groups in the municipality include:
  - Macedonians = 2,784 (85.7%)
  - Turks = 292 (9.0%)
  - Albanians = 155 (4.8%)
  - others = 18 (0.6%)

The total number of students in the municipality in 2011, in comparison to the total number of students in 2007, declined for about 30%. Drugovo is the third municipality in North Macedonia by the decline of the total number of students.

== Inhabited places ==
Settlements in the municipality include

- Belica, Brzhdani, Vidrani, Grand Crsko,
- Upper Dushegubica, Dobrenoec Upper,
- Lower Dushegubica, Lower Dobrenoec,
- Drugovo, Ehloec, Ivanchishta, Source,
- Javorec, Judovo, Kladnik, Klenoec, Kozica,
- Lavchani, Malkoec, Malo Crsko,
- Monastery Dolenci, Podvis, Popoec, Popolzhani,
- Prostranje, Svinjishte, Srbjani and Cer.
