= Vraneštica Municipality =

Former municipality of Macedonia

Coordinates: 41.46°N 21.02°E

Vraneštica Municipality Општина Вранештица
- Municipality
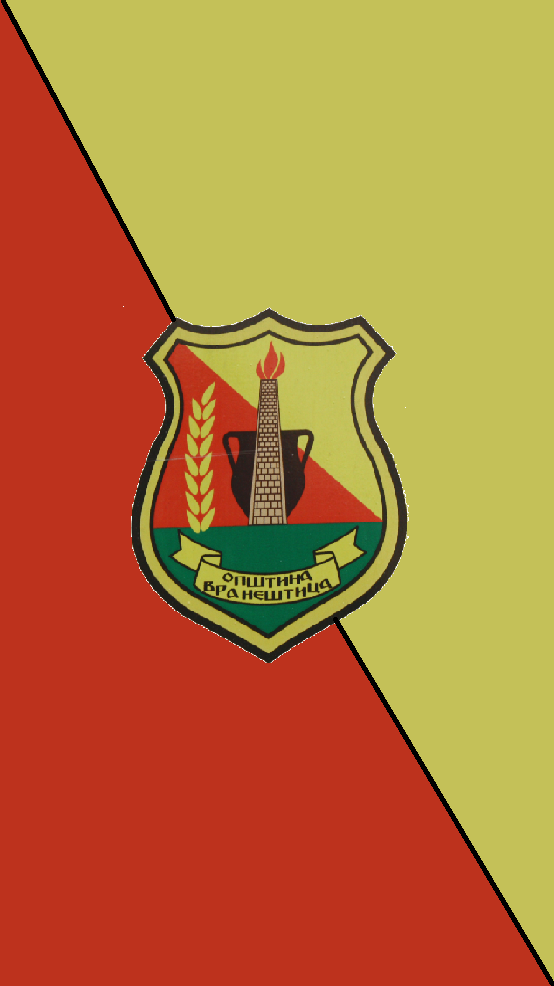
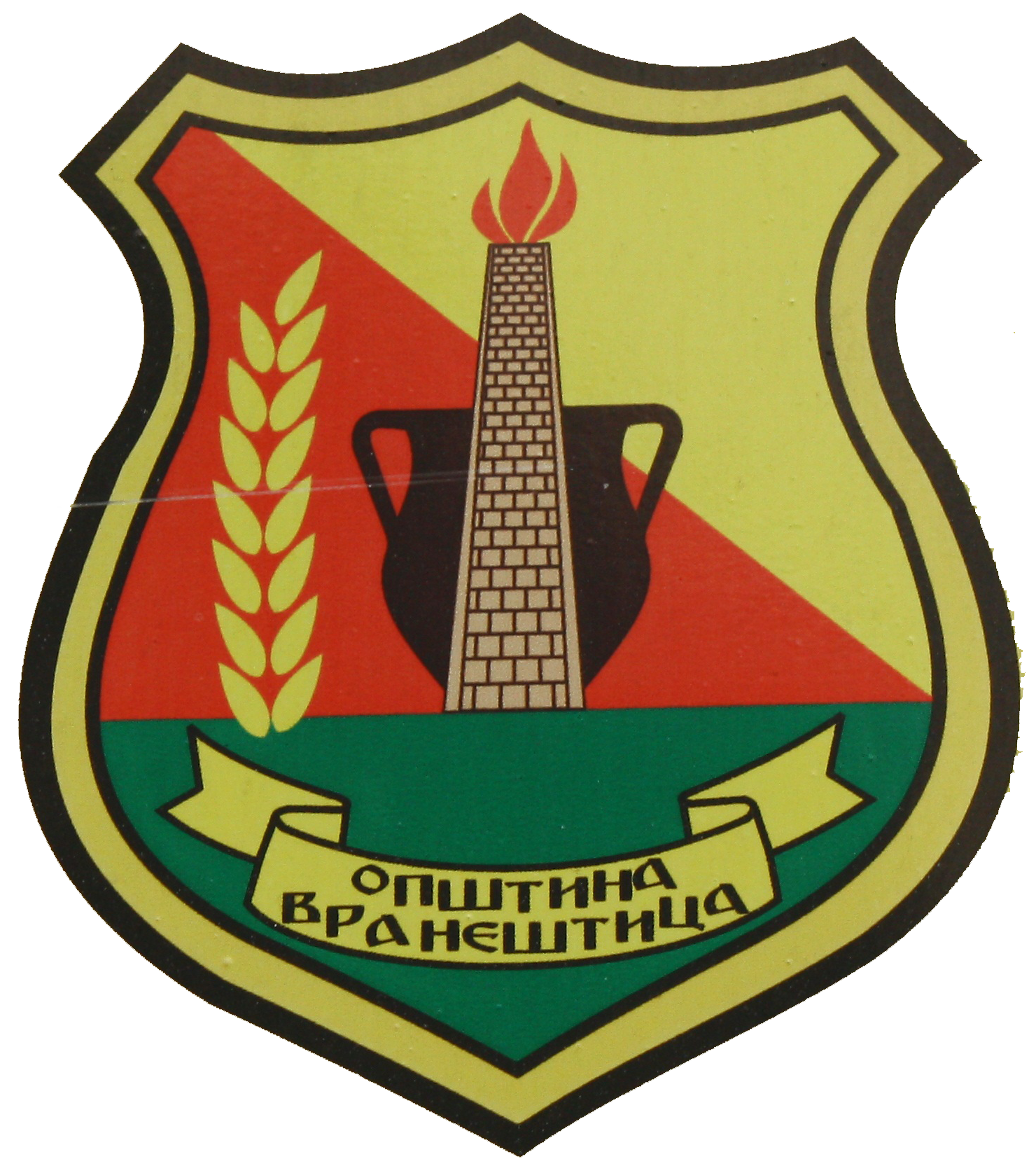
- Flag Seal

- Country: North Macedonia
- Region: Southwestern Statistical Region
- Municipal seat: Vraneštica

Population
  - Total: 1,322
- Time zone: UTC+1 (CET)
- Split from: Kičevo Municipality in 1996
- Merged into: Kičevo Municipality in 2013

Vraneštica (Macedonian: Вранештица) is a former municipality in western North Macedonia, created in the 1996 territorial organisation and dissolved following the 2013 Macedonian new territorial organisation, after it was merged with Kičevo Municipality. Vraneštica is also the name of the village where the municipal seat was found. This municipality was part of the Southwestern Statistical Region. The last mayor of the municipality was Vančo Srbakovski.

== Demographics ==
According to the last national census from 2002, this municipality has 1,322 inhabitants. Ethnic groups in the municipality include:

- Macedonians = 1033 (78.1%)
- Turks* = 276 (20.9%)
- Albanians = 10
- Serbs = 2
- Other = 1
