= Zajas Municipality =

Former municipality of North Macedonia

Coordinates: 41.59°N 20.94°E

Zajas Municipality Општина Зајас Komuna e Zajazit
- Former municipality of Macedonia
- Flag Seal

- Country: Republic of Macedonia
- Region: Southwestern Statistical
- Municipal seat: Zajas

Population
  - Total: 11,605
- Time zone: UTC+1 (CET)
- Split from: Kičevo Municipality in 1996
- Merged into: Kičevo Municipality in 2013

Zajas (Macedonian: Зајас, Albanian: Zajaz) is a former municipality located in what is now western North Macedonia, created in a 1996 territorial reorganization and dissolved following a new 2013 Macedonian territorial reorganization, after which it was merged with Kičevo Municipality.

- Zajas is also the name of the village where the municipal seat was found.
  - Zajas Municipality was part of the Southwestern Statistical Region.

== Geography ==
The municipality bordered

- Mavrovo and Rostuša Municipality to the west,
- Gostivar Municipality to the northeast,
- Oslomej Municipality to the east,
- Kičevo Municipality to the southeast, and
- Drugovo Municipality to the southwest.

== Demographics ==
According to the last national census from 2002, this municipality has 11,605 inhabitants.

- Ethnic groups in the municipality include:
  - Albanians = 11,308 (97.4%)
  - Macedonians = 211 (1.8%)
  - others = 86 (0.7%)

The total number of students in the municipality in 2011, in comparison to the total number of students in 2007, declined for 35.5%. Zajas is the second municipality in North Macedonia by the decline of the total number of students.
