= Oslomej =

Oslomej Осломеј
- Village
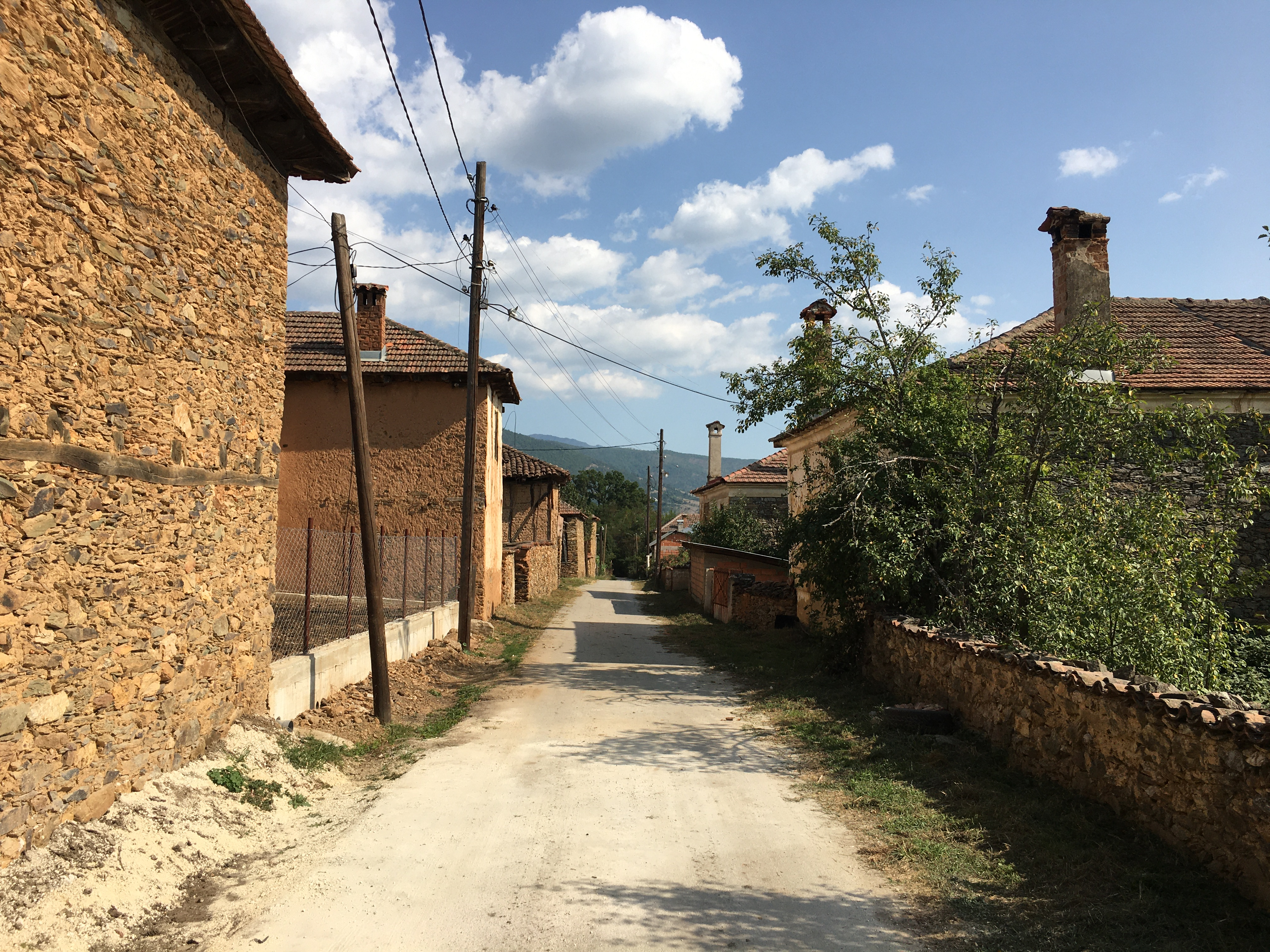
- Street in the village

- Location within North Macedonia
- Country: North Macedonia
- Region: Southwestern
- Municipality: Kičevo

Population (2002)
  - Total: 40
- Time zone: UTC+1 (CET)
  - Summer (DST): UTC+2 (CEST)
- Car plates: KI
- Website: .

Oslomej (Macedonian: Осломеј) is a village in Kičevo Municipality in North Macedonia. It was the seat of the now-defunct Oslomej Municipality.

== Demographics ==
According to the 2002 census, the village had a total of 40 inhabitants. Ethnic groups in the village include:

- Macedonians 40

According to the 1942 Albanian census, Oslomej was inhabited by a total of 81 Serbs and 148 Bulgarians.
