= 2021 North Macedonia census =

Government census in North Macedonia

The 2021 North Macedonia census, officially known as the Census of Population, Households and Dwellings, 2021, was the third census held in North Macedonia since independence, and the first since 2002. The census recorded a resident population of 1,836,713, a decrease of 9.2 percent, or 185,834, over the preceding 19 years. The census was taken during the COVID-19 pandemic, which affected its administration. It was also considered controversial by some Macedonian groups; the opposition party The Left openly led a boycott. 132,260 individuals (7.2% of the population) did not participate in the census and are officially labelled as "persons for whom data are taken from administrative sources"; no ethnic, language, or religious information is available for these individuals. Nonetheless, the head of the State Statistical Office, Apostol Simovski, stated that the census was successful. The ruling government and the European Commission also welcomed the results.

== Background ==
For the first time, members of the country's diaspora were allowed to self-register for the census. This participation was optional. Kosovo Prime Minister Albin Kurti encouraged ethnic Albanians in the diaspora to participate in the census.

Prior to the launching of the census, the main opposition party VMRO-DPMNE stated that the results would be rigged to show previously agreed-upon numbers between the ruling party and its ethnic Albanian coalition partners. "Don't Open the Door", an informal movement, called for citizens to boycott the census.

A boycott of the census was promoted by The Left.

== Results ==
The census recorded 1,836,713 residents of North Macedonia. The population density of the country is 72.2 persons per km^{2} and the average age of the population is 40.08 years. 598,632 households were recorded with average number of household members of 3.06. The gender balance of the country is 50.4% female and 49.6% male. Macedonians remained the largest ethnic group and Albanians remained the second largest ethnic group. All ethnic groups declined in population, with the exception of Bulgarians and Torbesi. Christianity remained the most practiced religion, followed by Islam, with negligible numbers from other faiths.

While most of the municipalities of the country lost population, the City of Skopje and several adjacent municipalities gained population. Nearly one-third of the population lives in Skopje.

Simovski reported that 300,000 Macedonian citizens living abroad did not register for the census. He stated that the Macedonian diaspora in Australia and North America boycotted the census.

Simovski clarified that the residential population is the only valid category taken in the census.

== Reactions ==
Upon release of the results, opposition leader Hristijan Mickoski called the census incomplete due to 7.2% of the population being unexplained. Both Mickoski and Democratic Union leader Pavle Trajanov claimed, based on where these individuals live, over 90% of that group is ethnic Macedonian. Mickoski stated that VMRO-DPMNE will conduct a new "e-census" upon regaining power. Political leaders from the ethnic Turkish and ethnic Bosniak communities have also found the results unacceptable. Politicians from Bulgaria, including Andrey Kovatchev and Slavi Trifonov, were critical of the census.

Following the results of the census, The Left declared that it does not recognize the results. The party pointed to 300,000 citizens that did not participate in the census, including the 132,000 living in the country that were counted as "persons for whom data are taken from administrative sources".

The Socialist Party of Macedonia and the Citizen Option for Macedonia have called the census invalid. The Macedonian Orthodox Church also expressed doubt in the census results.
