= Sloeštica =

Sloeštica Слоештица
- Village
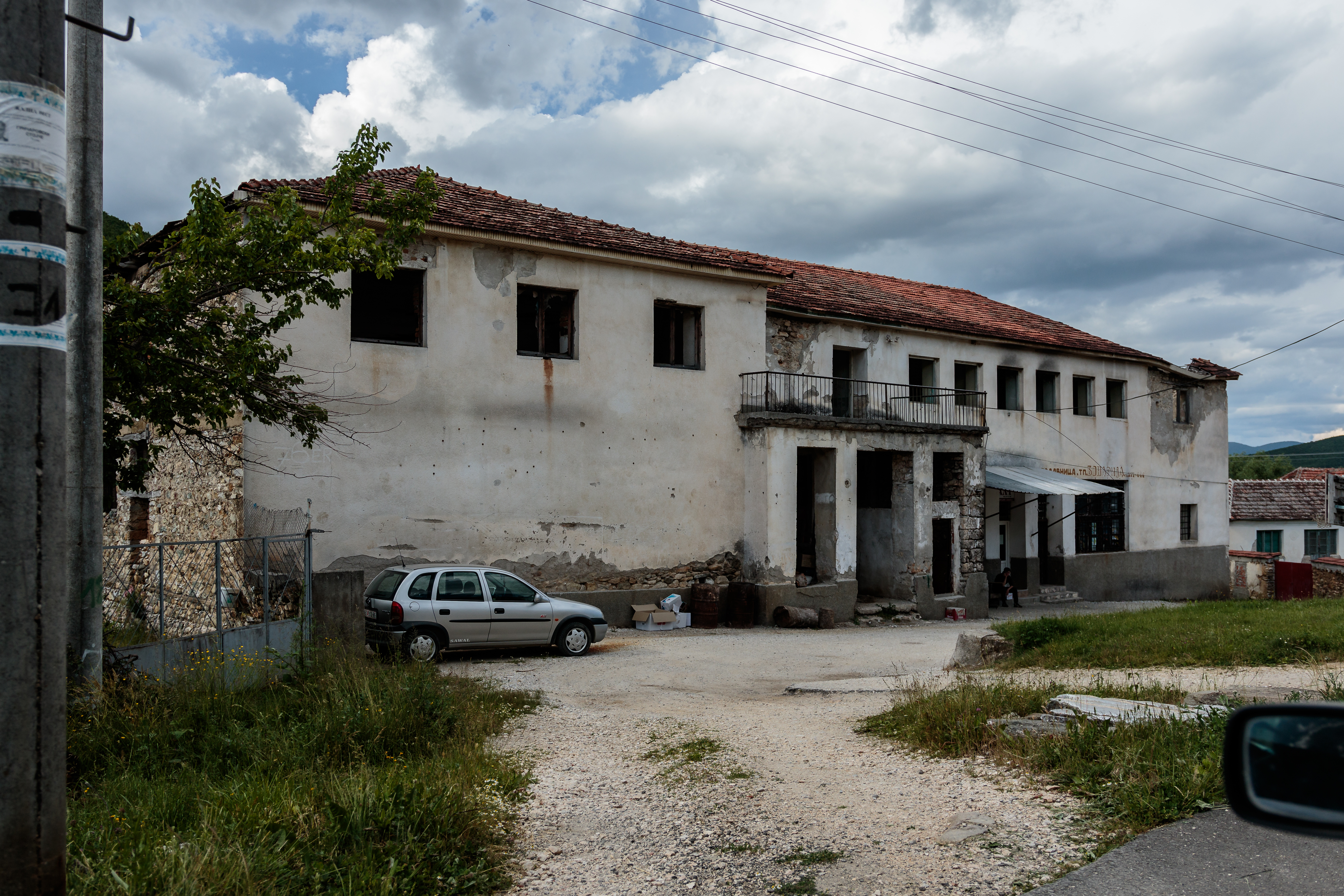
- Community center in the village Sloeštica

- Location within North Macedonia
- Coordinates: 41°16′0″N 21°4′36″E
- Country: North Macedonia
- Region: Pelagonia
- Municipality: Demir Hisar

Area
  - Total: 21.4 km^{2} (8.3 sq mi)
- Elevation: 770 m (2,530 ft)

Population (2002)
  - Total: 221
- Time zone: UTC+1 (CET)
  - Summer (DST): UTC+2 (CEST)
- Postal code: 7240
- Area code: +389 047
- Car plates: DH

Sloeštica (Macedonian: Слоештица) is a small village in the municipality of Demir Hisar, in the area of Zeleznik, in the vicinity of the town of Demir Hisar. It used to be part of the former municipality of Sopotnica.

== Geography ==
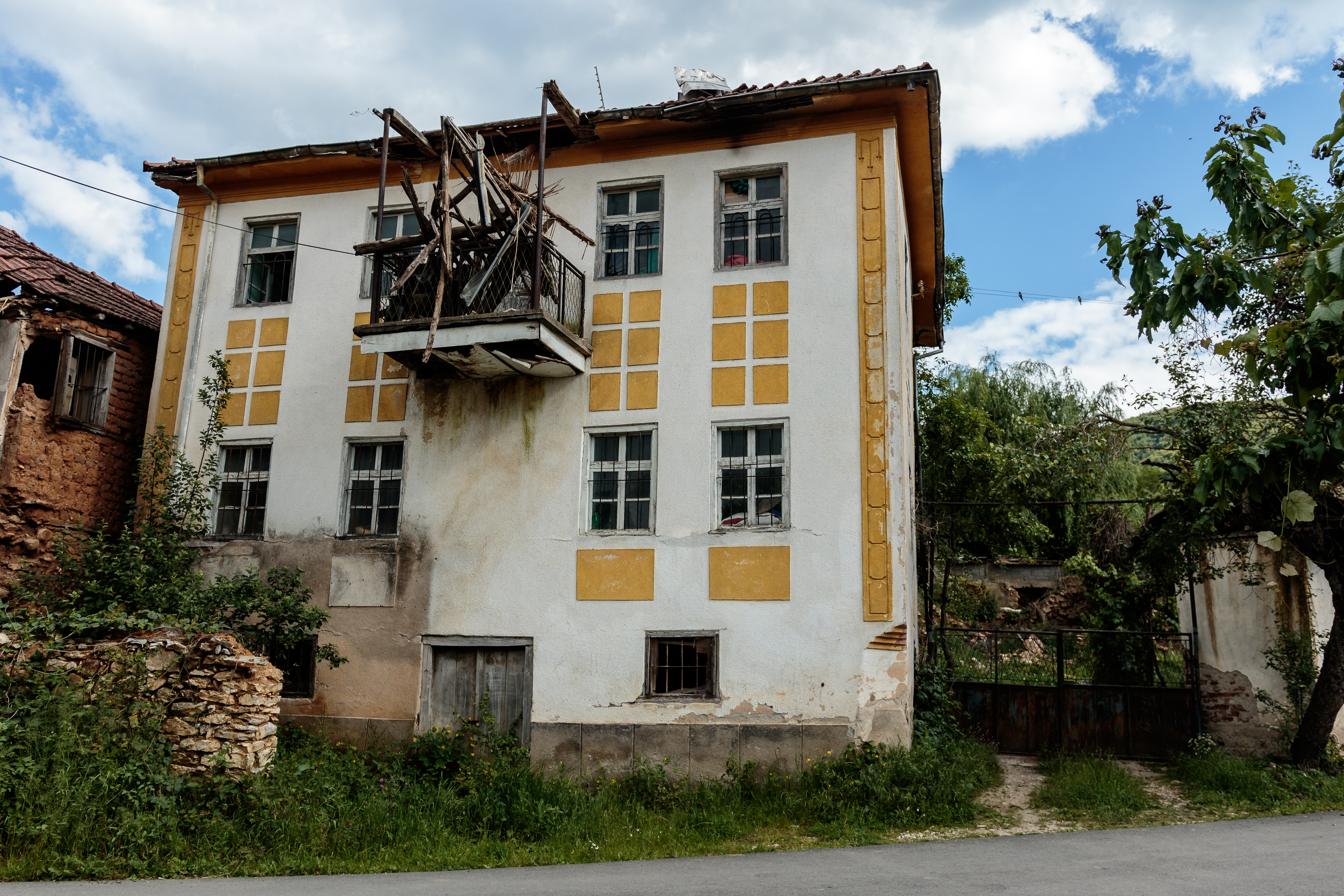
An old house in the village Sloeštica

The village is located in the southwest part of the Municipality of Demir Hisar, on the right side of Crna River. The village is hilly, at an altitude of 770 meters. It is 50 km (northwest) away from the nearest major city, Bitola.

The area around the village occupies an area of 21.4 km^{2}, with forests covering an area of 1,511 hectares, with arable land of 330 hectares, and 269 hectares of pastures.

The climate in the settlement is mountainous. It is bordered easterly by the Plakenska Mountain. There are two rivers running through the village: Bela Reka (Golemacha) and Levacha.

== History ==
During the Ilinden Uprising, the village was attacked on August 18, 1903 by Turkish forces. Villagers Bogoya Ivanov, Nikola Talev and Stoycho Ristev were killed from the village, and Mets Stoyanov and Dole Ristev from Slepche died as chetas near the village.

In October 1910 the village suffered during the disarmament action of the young Turks. A Bulgarian teacher in the village, Doychinov was arrested and jailed in the village of Pribilci.

== Population ==
In the 1467/1468 Ottoman defter, the village had 15 households, 1 widow and 1 bachelor. A majority of household heads bore Slavic names, while a third bore Albanian and mixed Slavic-Albanian ones.

According to Vasil Kanchov in his Macedonia Ethnography and Statistics from 1900, there were 650 inhabitants in the village of Sloeshtica, in 90 houses, all Bulgarians. Following this, the secretary of the Bulgarian Exarchate, Dimitar Mishev, recorded in his book La Macédoine et sa Population Chrétienne a population of 720 inhabitants in 1905.

During the second half of the 20th century, a number of the population moved from Sloeshtica, going from a medium to a small village. In 1961 the village had 746 inhabitants, and in 1994, 299 inhabitants.

According to the last census of 2002, 221 inhabitants lived in the village, all Macedonians.

The following table summarizes the population in all censuses:
Year	Pop.	±%
1900	650	—
1905	720	+10.8%
1948	878	+21.9%
1953	841	−4.2%
1961	746	−11.3%
1971	621	−16.8%
1981	535	−13.8%
1991	312	−41.7%
1994	299	−4.2%
2002	221	−26.1%
Source: Source for 1948-2002 State Statistical Office of North Macedonia .

=== Research on historical families ===
According to the research of Branislav Rusic in 1952, the genealogy of the village includes the following family names:

- Family names with an unknown origin or name: Domazetovci (2 k.), Kaychovci (7 k.), Korunovci (2 k.), Kuzevci (2 k.), Dzhaykovci (4 k.), Jankulovci (5 k.), Bogevci (2 k.), Sivevci and Plevnesovci (21 k.), Despotovci (2 k.), Petkovci (5 k.), Petrevci (5 k.), Gjorgovtsi Mitrevci (8 k.), Meglenovci (8 k.), Kaparkovci (13 k.), Gyurkovci (2 k.), Bojanovci (1 k.) And Nochevci (6 k.)
- Family names with a known age: Popovci (11 k.) settled from the village Babino; Ilijevci (1 k.) settled from the village of Cerovo; Poljankovci (1 k.) settled from the village of Suvo Selo; Trajanovci (7 k.) settled from the village of Galičnik in Mijaks region; Svrgovci (4 k.) settled from the village of Bazernik; Evenovci (2 k.) settled from the village of Sladuevo; Trenchevci (2 k.) settled from the village of Jankovec. Finally there is Alekso (living at the age of 45 in 1952), Tale-Stojko-Trenche.

== Social facilities ==
There is a single primary school, known as Braka Miladinovci, named after the Miladinov brothers. It teaches up to the 5th grade.

== Cultural and natural landmarks ==
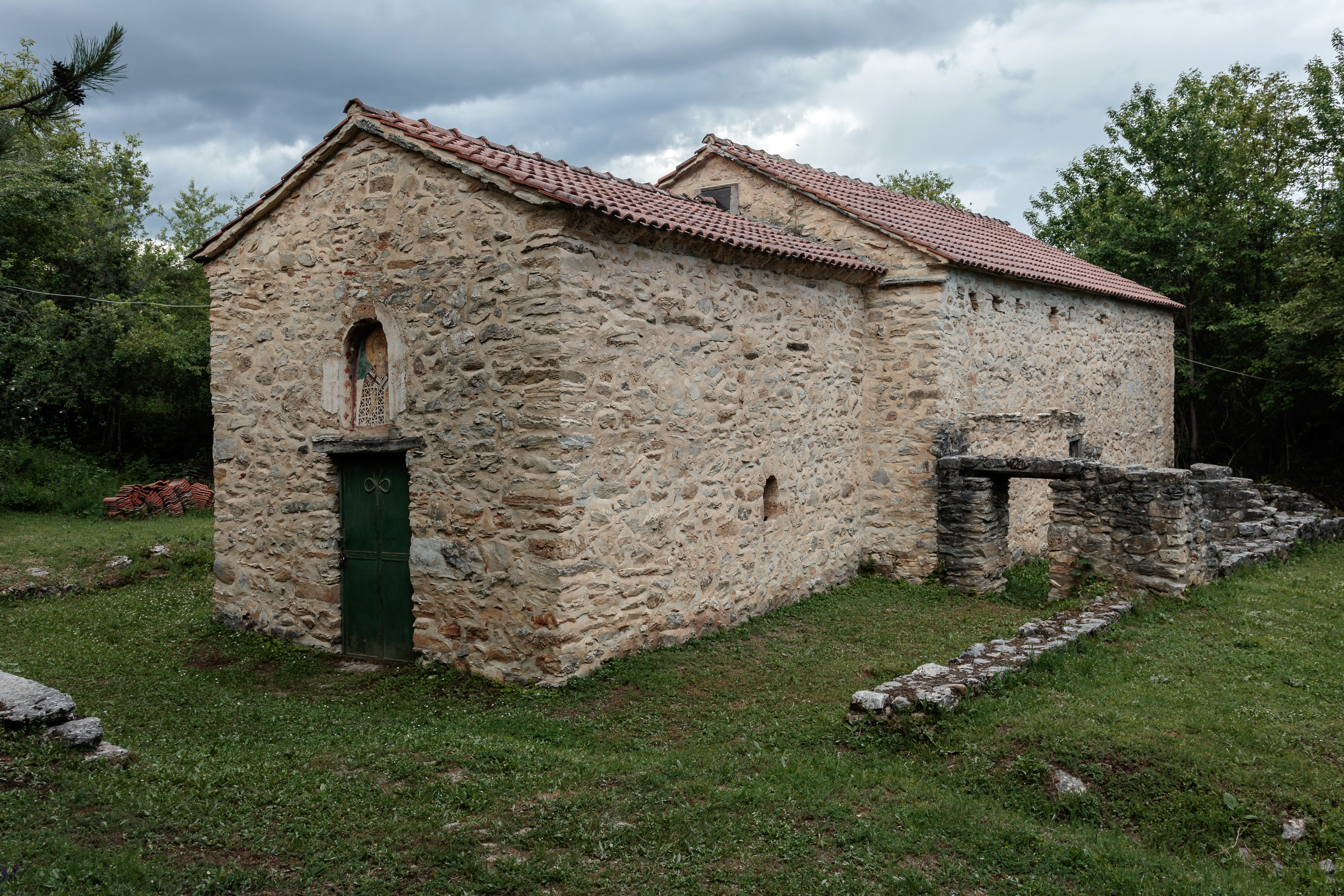
The main monastery church, St. Nikola on the Toplice

- Archaeological sites:
1. The turn - settlement from Late Antiquity.

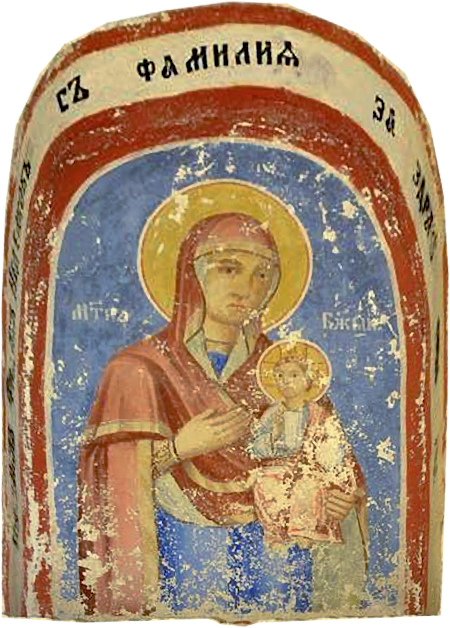
An image from the Mother of God church.

- Churches:
1. Church "St. Mother of God " - the main village church (post Byzantian)
2. Church "St. Atanasij " - the cemetery village church (post Byzantian)
3. Church "St. Gorgi " - a monastery church
4. Church "St. Ilija "
5. Church "St. Nikola " - monastery church of the Toplice monastery
- Valavici (artificial waterfall)
  - Near the village there are waterfalls, artificially built and used in washing and cleaning clothing and blankets.

== Cultural events ==
Every year on August 28, there is the "Celebration of the Pirejot", held in memory of the writer Petre M. Andreevski.

== Notable individuals ==
- Elijah Dimovski, leader of the detachment from Sloeštica during the Ilinden-Preobrazhenie uprising in 1903
- Jordan Plevnes - writer
- Stoyan Acev - Macedonian-Adrianople Corps
- Petre M Andreevski - writer
