= Babino, Demir Hisar =

Babino Бабино
- Village
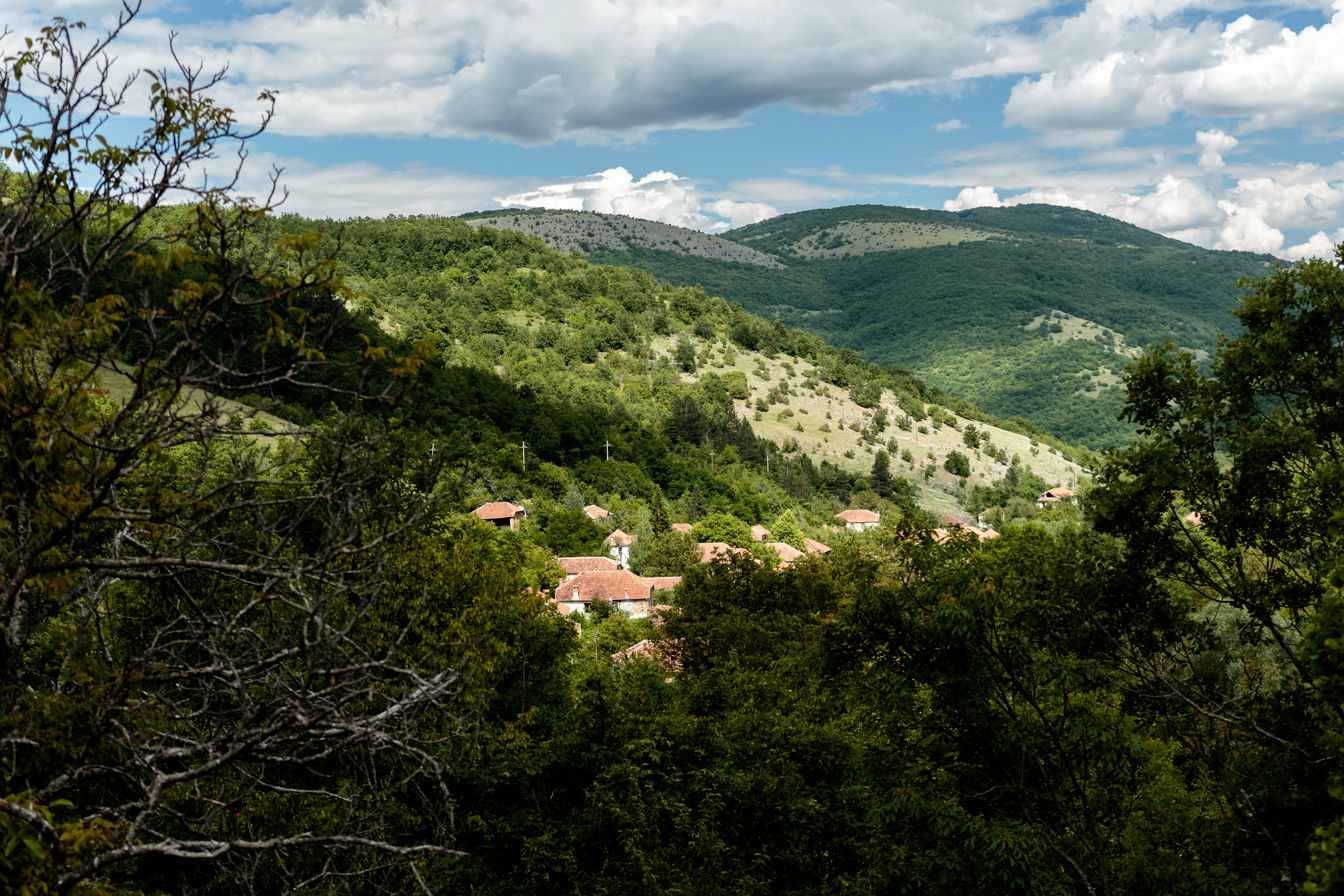
- View of Babino village

- Location within North Macedonia
- Coordinates: 41°17′58″N 21°4′47″E
- Country: North Macedonia
- Region: Pelagonia
- Municipality: Demir Hisar

Area
  - Total: 9.9 km^{2} (3.8 sq mi)
- Elevation: 750 m (2,460 ft)

Population (2002)
  - Total: 34
- Time zone: UTC+1 (CET)
  - Summer (DST): UTC+2 (CEST)
- Postal code: 7240
- Area code: +389 047
- Car plates: DH

Babino (Macedonian Бабино) is a small village in the municipality of Demir Hisar, in the area of Zeleznik, in the vicinity of the town of Demir Hisar. It used to be part of the former municipality of Sopotnica.

== Geography ==
The village is located between the three hills Pavlov Rid (911), Tri Sinori (1,111) and Kurati (1,017).

There are many springs in the area of Babino. Along the Bazernicka River, there is a spring almost every 100 meters, starting from Gorni Livadi, all the way to the confluence with the Crna River. The water from the springs replenishes the river.

The village is divided into three neighborhoods: Upper, Lower and Middle.

Surrounding villages are: Malo Ilino and Bazernik from the southwest and west, Dolenci and Zeleznec from the north and northeast, Žvan from the southeast, and Sloeshtica from the south.

== History ==
The village is mentioned in the Ottoman census books from 1467/68 with 27 families and 2 unmarried, or a total of 137 inhabitants. The population paid a tax for wheat, barley, streets, pigs, mills, vineyards, watermelons and weddings (a tax paid only by Christians), 725 silver Turkish money. The onomastics consisted almost entirely of Christian Slavic anothroponyms, with the exception of one case of the Albanian anthroponym Dushman being present.

In the census book of 1568 the village had 140 inhabitants.

In the Ottoman records from 1611-1612 the village is listed as Babine with 47 tax-paying households.

In 1683 the inhabitants of Babino together with those of Kochishte, Zashle, Brezovo and Dolenci refused to pay the tax and killed their collector.

In the XIX century Babino is a completely Christian village in the Bitola kaza, nahija Demir Hisar of the Ottoman Empire. The Bulgarian Exarchate was active in the village and there was a Bulgarian language school in the village.

In 1882, the first books were brought to Babino in the old house of Stevo Stepanovski's great-grandfather. He was a Turkish soldier to whom, due to lack of money from the state treasury, the Turks paid him with books. He started buying books from his comrades and made a library fund.

The village was an active center of the Ilinden Uprising. On the evening of August 1, 1903, in the Babino meadows of the locality "Ramni Livadi" the Kruševo flag was waved which was completely red, with the inscription "Freedom or death". In Babino's meadows, the detachments took an oath of "Death or Freedom" and set out to attack the village of Pribilci. The population was promptly informed to flee to the mountain. The insurgent detachments were led by: Jordan Piperkata and Nikola Dechev - vojvodi, and the village detachment was led by Vojvoda Stepan Stepanovski. The village was part of the Krushevo Republic, which lasted only 13 days. The suppression of the uprising was with the help of a Turkish army from Asia. In the last free days of the village, a group of detachments dug under the village of Babino at the place "Kula" from where they opened fire on the Turkish army. The Turkish army began to pursue the detachments and entered the villages and the Ilinska Mountain. A collision with the Turkish army took place near Ilinska Church and 7 chetniks were killed there, all from the village of Virovo.

In 1912, during the outbreak of the First Balkan War in 1912, three residents of Babino became volunteers in the Macedonian-Adrianopolitan Volunteer Corps.

There are 162 teachers from Babino, who after the Second World War spread literacy throughout Macedonia.

=== Legends ===
Residents believe the legend of the old woman from Babino, who, driven away by her daughters-in-law, lived alone deep in the forests of Ilinska Mountain for years. The expelled old woman, angry with fate, cursed the whole female gender from the end of her old age to live a lonely life just like her. Hence the belief that the village got its name Babino.

According to another legend, when the ancient Romans first conquered this territory, they started the practice of extermination of the male population, in order to facilitate assimilation and colonization. Almost all the women from the village with small children fled to the mountains and lived there for decades. When they returned to rebuild the village, they were all already grandmothers.

It is believed that the Apostle Paul passed and stayed on Pavlov Hill, who, spreading Christianity, first passed through Macedonia. He baptized several inhabitants here.

Kurati peak, on the other hand, allegedly got its name because of the "talented" men in Babino.

It is believed that the girl sung in the revolutionary song "Gjurgo came out to see the comites " comes from this village.

A curiosity is that the locals even in old age have lush hair. They are believed to have a secret remedy for hair loss.

== Economy ==
The village economy consists mostly of farming and forestry. Arable land covers 236.2 hectares, pastures cover 161.5 hectares, while there 477.4 hectares is forested. There are ongoing initiatives for tourism development. In the past, tourism promoter Nasser Hot suggested that a park of the peoples of the world be built on Kurati Hill - typical wooden houses, representative of the traditional national houses of the peoples. But this initiative was abandoned. According to some indicators, Babino is visited by about 25,000 tourists a year. Some of them are attracted by the natural beauties of the village, and many of them come because of the famous library. Among them are writers, academics, participants in the Struga Poetry Evenings, participants in the Macedonian Language and Culture Seminar, students at the Syrian University, Moroccan theologians, ambassadors, the biographer of Winston Churchill, etc.

== Population ==
According to the statistics of the Bulgarian scientist Vasil Kanchov ("Macedonia. Ethnography and Statistics") from 1900, Babino had 430 inhabitants, all Bulgarians.

The table below provides an overview of the population in all census years:

The following table summarizes the population in all censuses:
Year	Pop.	±%
1900	430	—
1905	480	+11.6%
1948	547	+14.0%
1953	533	−2.6%
1961	451	−15.4%
1971	319	−29.3%
1981	194	−39.2%
1991	104	−46.4%
1994	70	−32.7%
2002	34	−51.4%
Source: Source for 1948-2002 State Statistical Office of North Macedonia .

=== Research on historical families ===
According to Branislav Rusic's research in 1951 genera in the village:

Indigenous: Ugleshovci (5 k.), Tokmakovci (2 k.), Radevci (4 k.), Karadakovci (2 k.), Gjurkovci (4 k.), Despotovci (14 k.), Spasenovci (5 k.), Tanevci (6 k.), Jancevci (3 k.), Grashinovci (6 k.) And Popovci (24 k.). Immigrants of unknown origin: Strezovci (3 k.). Immigrants of known origin: Filipovci (9 families) and Parmakovci (2 families) immigrated from the village of Karbunica in the Kichevo region; Kochovci (1 family) and Popovci (7 families) immigrated from the village of Lesani in Debrca .

=== Polling station ===
In the village there is polling station no. 641 according to the State Election Commission, located in the premises of a local community. In the presidential elections in 2019, a total of 20 voters were registered at this polling station.

== Emigration ==
A huge portion of the population has moved to Skopje, Bitola, Demir Hisar, Veles and other cities in Macedonia. There is also emigration to Australia, France and other countries.

The following emigrants are known individually until 1951:

- From Ugleshovci to: Belgrade (one family).
- From Tokmakovci to: Ruma (one family).
- From Radevci to: Bitola (four families).
- From Gjurkovci to: Bulgaria (one family).
- From Despotovci in: Bitola (two families), Kochishte (since 1948), Pribilci (one family) and in the USA (one family).
- From Spasenovci to: Bitola (four families) and Sofia (two families).
- From Tanevci to: Bitola (six families), Kremenica (one family), Lavci (one family), Bulgaria (one family), Buchin (one family) and Pribilci (one family).
- From Jancevci to: Bitola (one family).
- From Grashinovci to: Serbia (one family) and Demir Hisar (one family).
- From Popovci to: Chepigovo (one family), Bitola (one family), Romania (one family), Skopje (one family), Lopatica (one family), USA (one family) and Ohrid (one family).
- From Strezovci to: Bitola (two families) and in Bulgaria (one family).
- From Vilipovci to: Demir Hisar (one family), Bulgaria (one family), Florina (one family since 1920) and in the USA (one family).
- From Parmakovci to: Demir Hisar (four families).
- From Kochovci to: Pribilci (five families).
- From Popovci to: Krivogashtani (one family), Bitola (three families), Romania (two families), USA (one family), Belgrade (one family), Sremska Mitrovica (two families) and Sofia (one family).

== Gallery ==
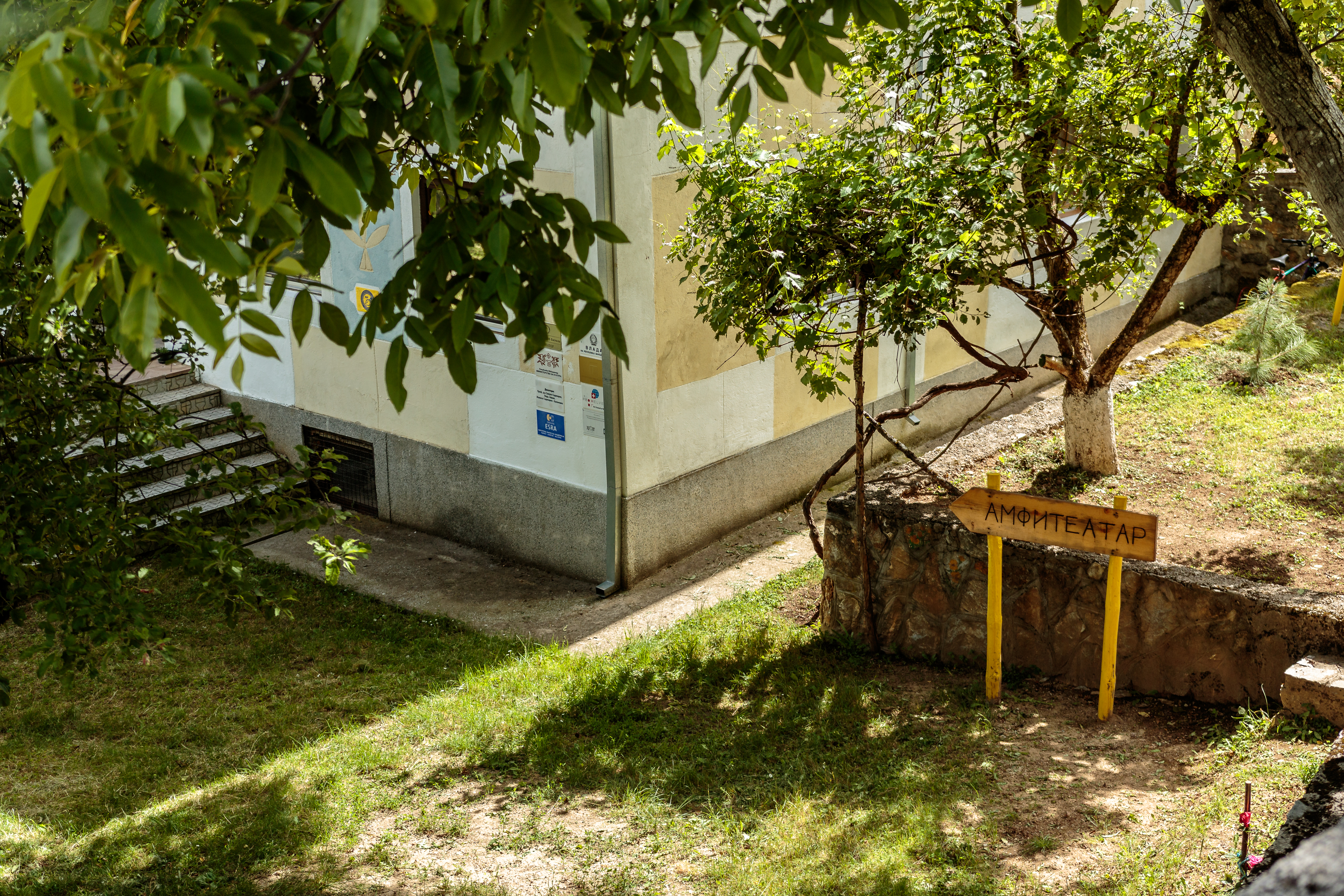
Entry to the library

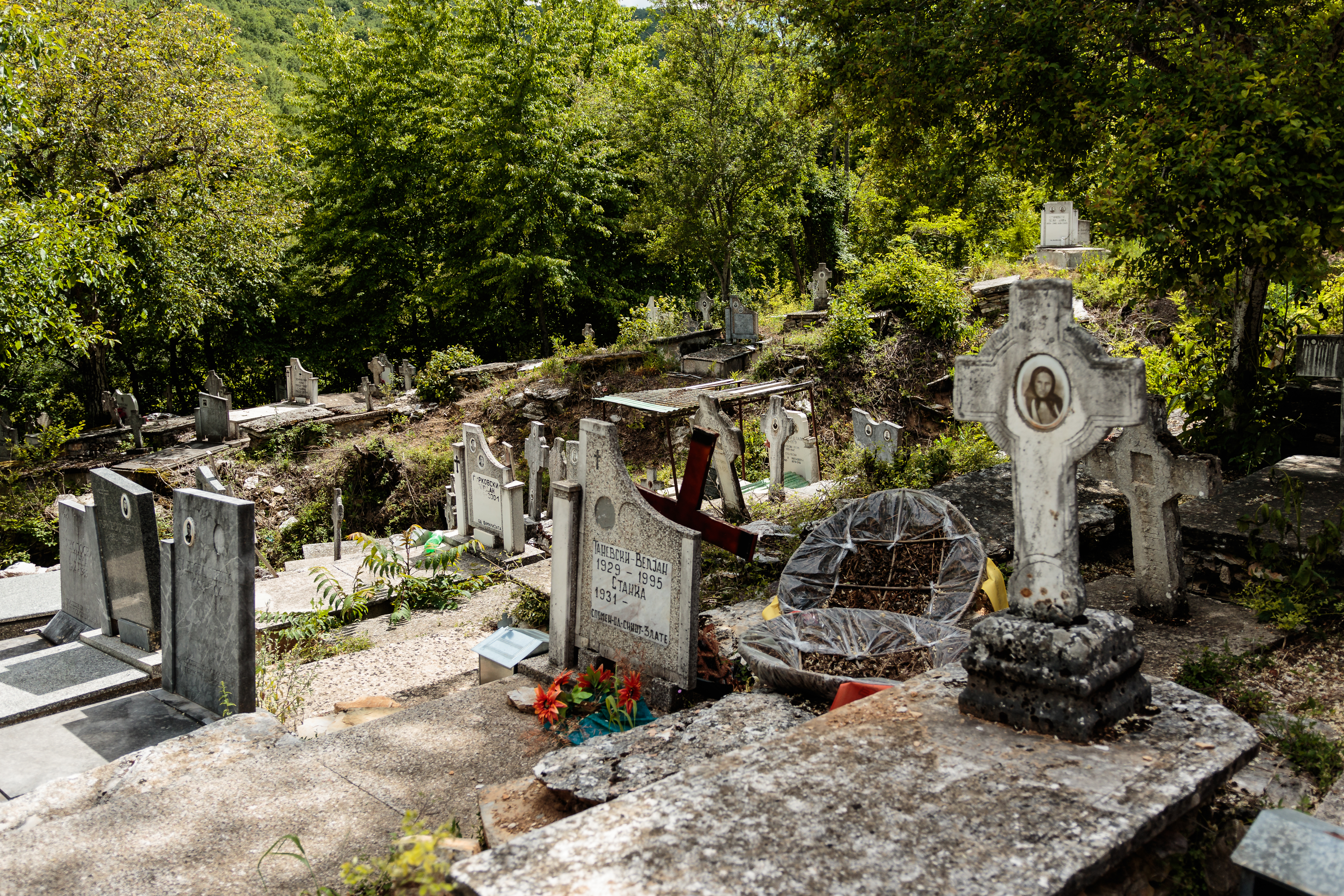
Portion of the graves in the churchyard of "St Nikola"

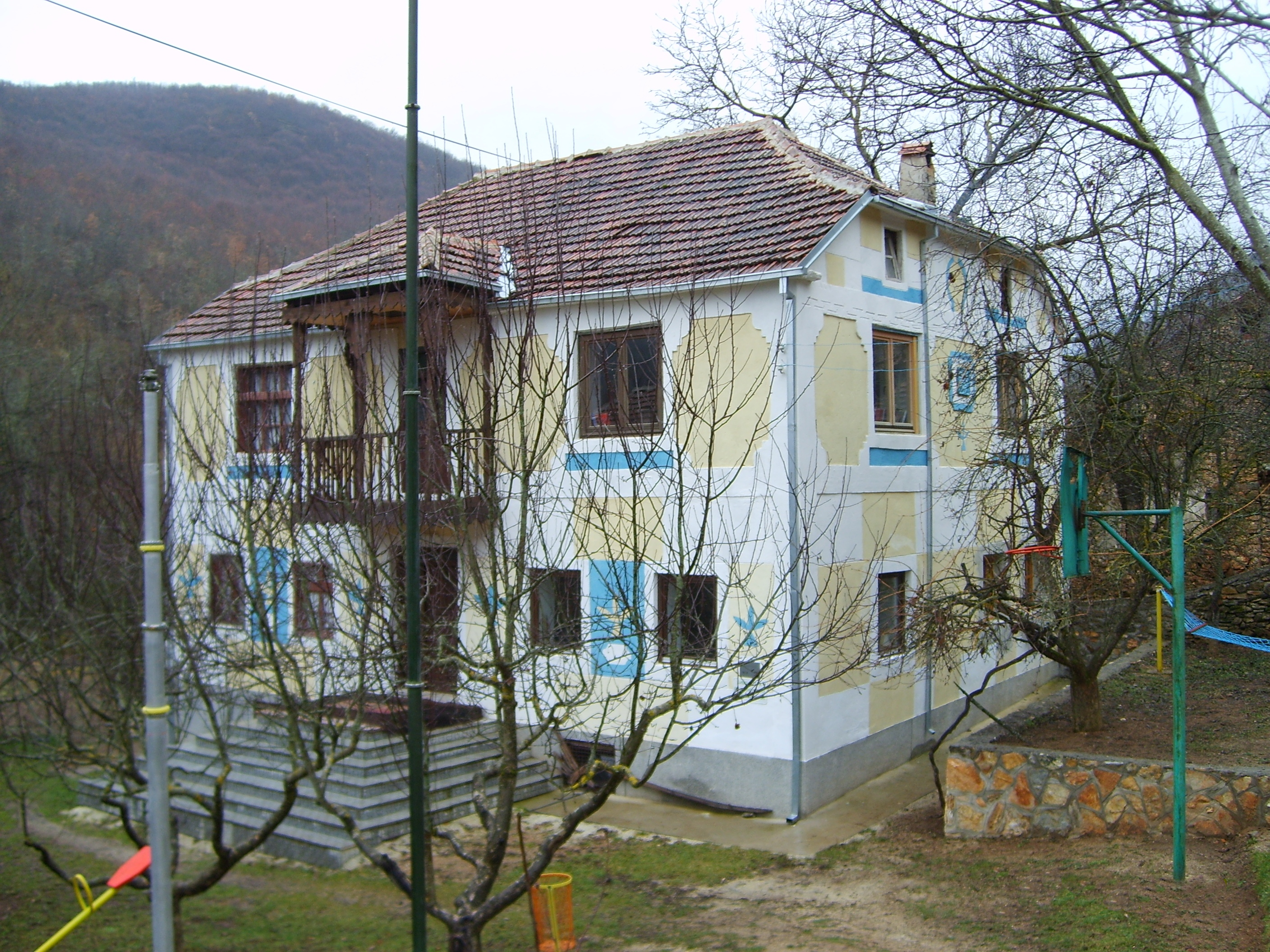
Library of Babino

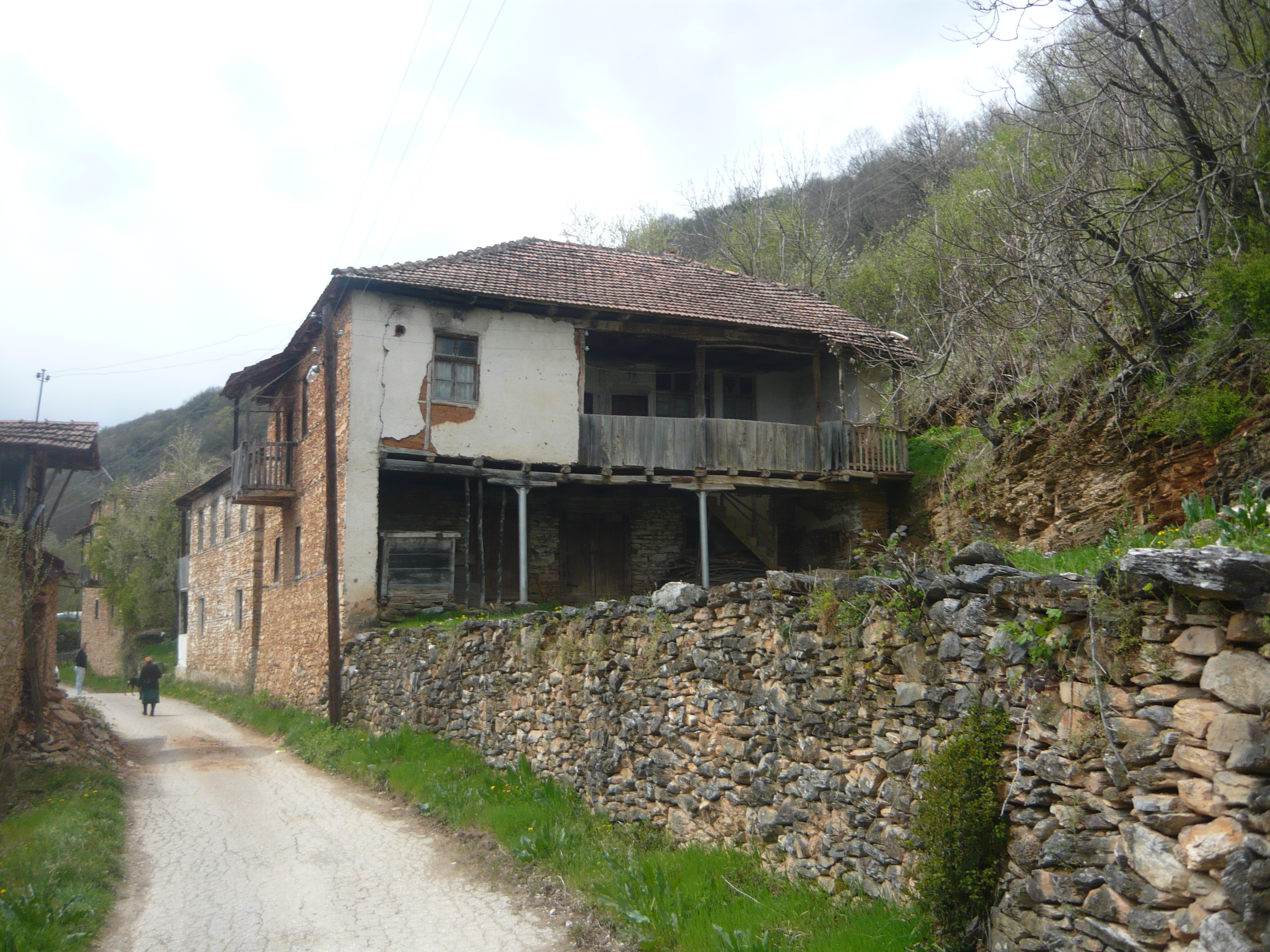
Old architecture in Babino

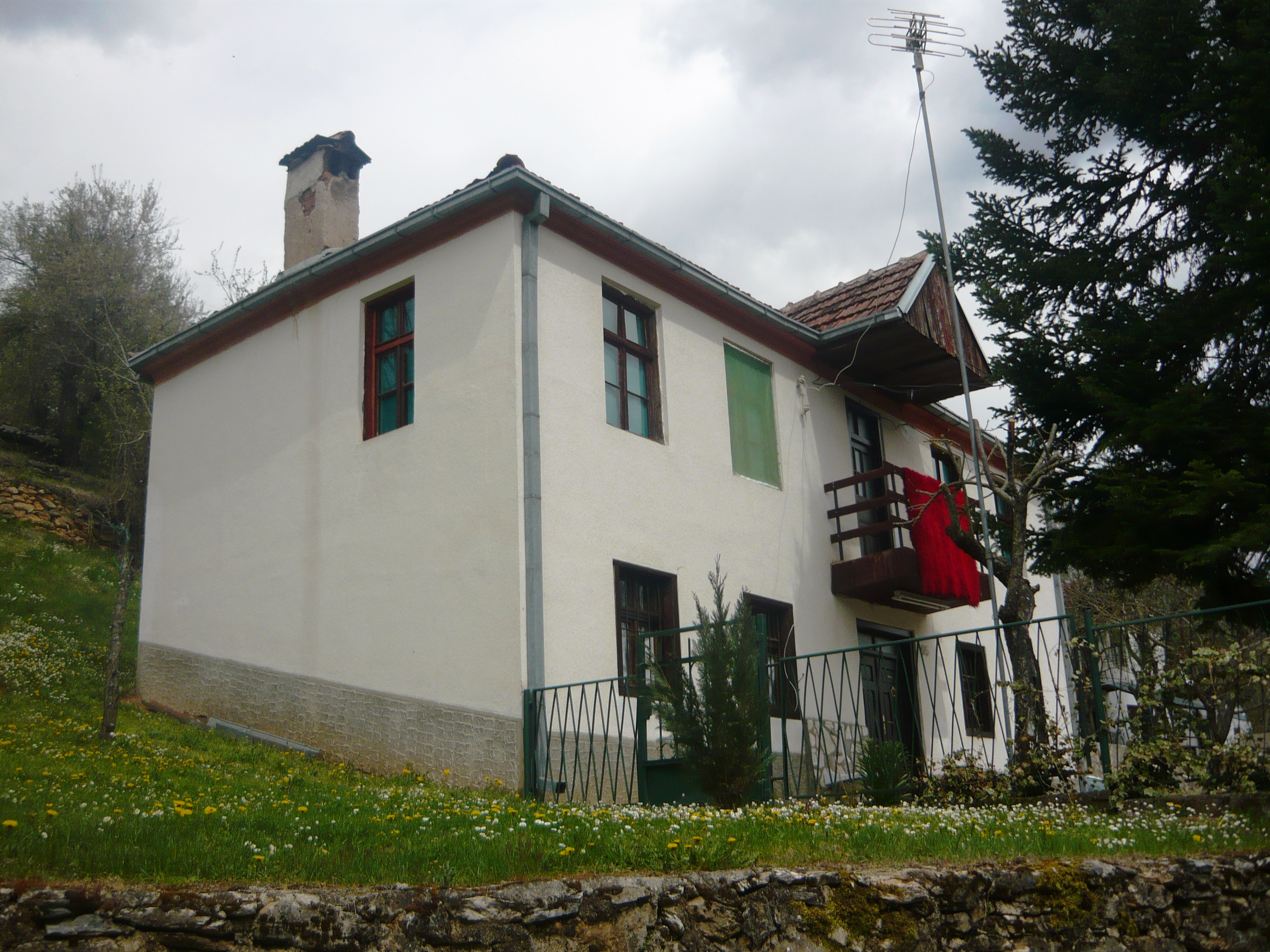
Modern house in the village
