= Mrenoga =

Mrenoga Мренога
- Village
- Location within North Macedonia
- Coordinates: 41.256095°N 21.107818°E
- Country: North Macedonia
- Region: Pelagonia
- Municipality: Demir Hisar

Population (2002)
  - Total: 107
- Time zone: UTC+1 (CET)
  - Summer (DST): UTC+2 (CEST)
- Website: .

Mrenoga (Macedonian: Мренога) is a village in the municipality of Demir Hisar, North Macedonia. It used to be part of the former municipality of Sopotnica.

== Demographics ==
In the 1467/1468 Ottoman defter, the village had 20 households, 4 bachelors and 5 widows. The large majority of household heads bore Slavic names, with a small minority carrying Albanian ones.

In statistics gathered by Vasil Kanchov in 1900, the village of Mrenoga was inhabited by 380 Christian Bulgarians.

According to the 2002 census, the village had a total of 107 inhabitants. Ethnic groups in the village include:

- Macedonians 105
- Other 2
