= Demir Hisar (disambiguation) =

Demir Hisar is a town in North Macedonia.

It may also refer to:

- Demir Hisar Municipality, a municipality in North Macedonia
- Demir Hisar (region), a region in North Macedonia

== See also ==
- Demirhisar (disambiguation)
