= Zagoriče =

Zagoriče Загориче
- Village
- Air view of the village

- Location within North Macedonia
- Coordinates: 41.189549°N 21.195982°E
- Country: North Macedonia
- Region: Pelagonia
- Municipality: Demir Hisar

Population (2002)
  - Total: 115
- Time zone: UTC+1 (CET)
  - Summer (DST): UTC+2 (CEST)
- Website: .

Zagoriče (Macedonian: Загориче) is a village in the municipality of Demir Hisar, North Macedonia.

== Demographics ==
Zagoriče is attested in the Ottoman defter of 1467/68 as a village in the vilayet of Manastir. The village had 25 households, 3 bachelors and 2 widows. The inhabitants attested almost exclusively bore typical Slavic anthroponyms, with onlyone instance of an Albanian anthroponym, Gerg siromah.

According to the 2002 census, the village had a total of 115 inhabitants. Ethnic groups in the village include:

- Macedonians 115
