= Crna River (Vardar) =

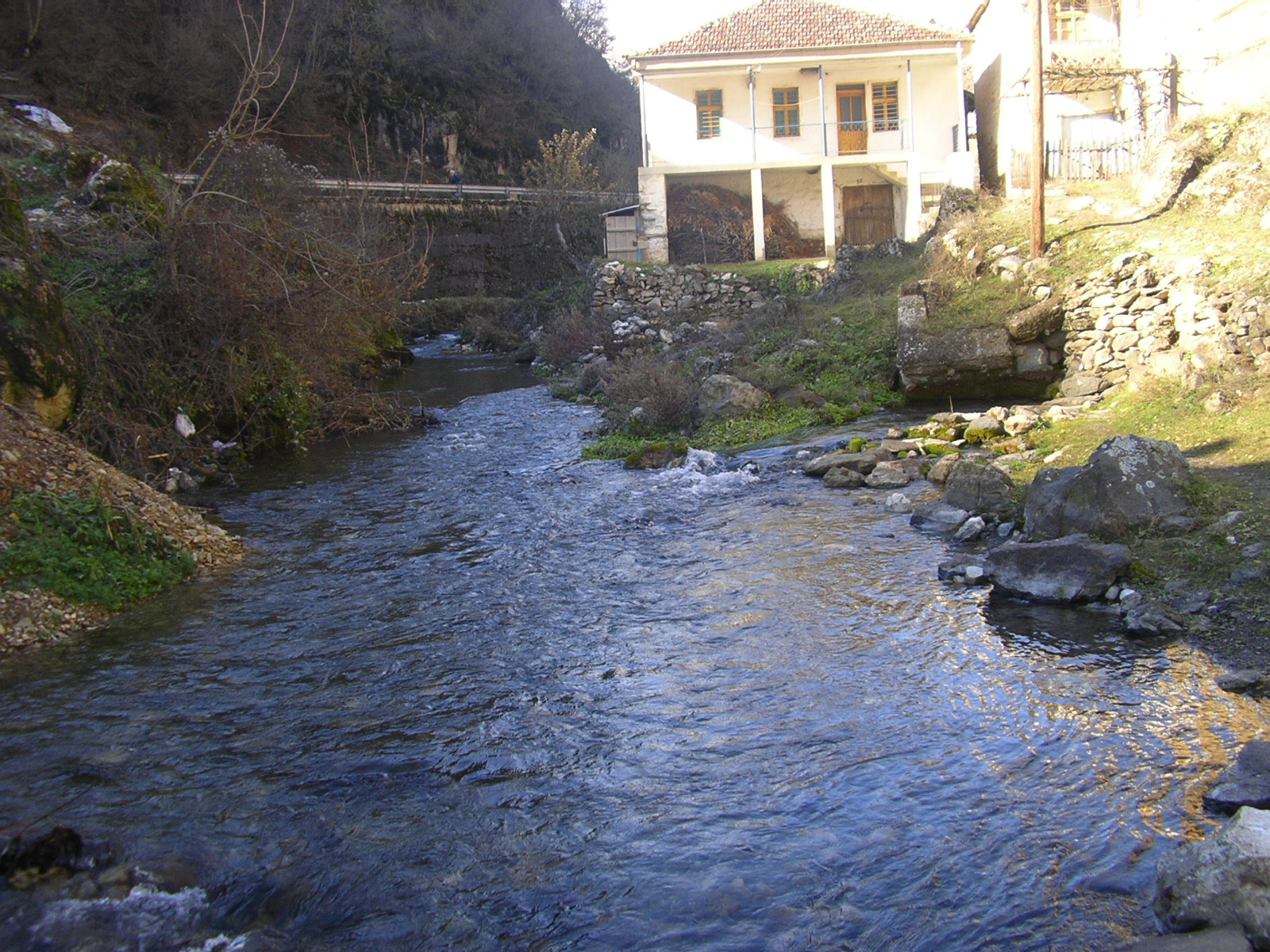
- Crna River in Železnec, near Demir Hisar
- Native name: Црна Река (Macedonian)

Location
- Country: North Macedonia

Physical characteristics
- Source
  - location: Železnec
- Mouth
  - location: Vardar
  - coordinates: 41°33′18″N 21°58′49″E
- Length: 207 km (129 mi)

Basin features
- Progression: Vardar→ Aegean Sea

The Crna River (Macedonian: Црна Река Црна Река;"Black River"), also known in English as Cherna (Bulgarian: Черна), (Note: The river is known in English also as the Cherna. English name derived from the "Battle of the Cherna River bend" during WWI; Bulgarian: Битка при завоя на Черна.) is a river in North Macedonia. It is a right tributary of the Vardar River. It runs through much of the south and west of the country. Its source is in the mountains on the western part of North Macedonia, northwest of Demir Hisar.

It enters the Pelagonia valley at the village of Buchin and then flows through the village Sopotnica, and southwards through the plains east of Bitola. At Brod (Novaci Municipality) it turns northeast. It leaves the Pelagonia valley at the Staravina village and goes in the biggest canyon in North Macedonia, the Skočivir valley and flows into the Vardar River between Rosoman and Gradsko.

Thus, the river makes a bend of almost 180 degrees east of Bitola. This bend was part of the Macedonian front in World War I. It was known to the allied forces as the Cerna Bend or Cerna Loop, and two major battles were fought here: the Battle of the Crna Bend (1916) and the Battle of the Crna Bend (1917).

The name Crna Reka means "Black River" in Macedonian, a translation of its earlier Thracian name, Erigon (Ancient Greek: Ἐριγών, romanized: Erigón), meaning "black", akin to Greek érebos, "darkness"; Armenian erek, "evening"; Old Norse røkkr, "darkness"; Gothic riqis, "darkness"; Sanskrit rájas, "night"; and Tocharian B orkamo, "dark".

The Erigon River is mentioned by Arrian in the Anabasis of Alexander, Livy in the History of Rome Strabo in the Geographica, Athenaeus in the Deipnosophistae.

The Roman provincial capital of Stobi sat at the intersection of the Vardar and the Crna.
