= Kutretino =

Kutretino Кутретино
- Village
- Air view of the village

- Location within North Macedonia
- Coordinates: 41.208556°N 21.213727°E
- Country: North Macedonia
- Region: Pelagonia
- Municipality: Demir Hisar

Population (2021)
  - Total: 264
- Time zone: UTC+1 (CET)
  - Summer (DST): UTC+2 (CEST)
- Car plates: DH
- Website: .

Kutretino (Macedonian: Кутретино) is a village in the municipality of Demir Hisar, North Macedonia.

== Demographics ==
Kutretino is attested in the Ottoman defter of 1467/68 as a village in the vilayet of Manastir. The village had 26 households, 2 bachelors and 3 widows. The inhabitants attested almost exclusively bore typical Slavic anthroponyms, with a small minority bearing Albanian anthroponyms.

In statistics gathered by Vasil Kanchov in 1900, the village of Kutretino was inhabited by 52 Christian Bulgarians.

According to the 2002 census, the village had a total of 301 Macedonians.

According to the census of 2021, the village had 264 inhabitants, Ethnic groups in the village include:

- Macedonians 257
- Albanians 1
- 6 people without data
