= Belče =

Village in Demir Hisar Municipality, North Macedonia

Belče Белче
- Village
- Air view of the village

- Location within North Macedonia
- Coordinates: 41.245380°N 21.201352°E
- Country: North Macedonia
- Region: Pelagonia
- Municipality: Demir Hisar

Population (2002)
  - Total: 245
- Time zone: UTC+1 (CET)
  - Summer (DST): UTC+2 (CEST)
- Website: .

Belče (Macedonian: Белче) is a village in the municipality of Demir Hisar, North Macedonia.

== Demographics ==
in the 1467/1468 Ottoman defter, the village had 9 households and 2 widow. The onomastics consisted entirely of Christian Slavic anthroponyms. In statistics gathered by Vasil Kanchov in 1900, the village of Belče was inhabited by 100 Christian Bulgarians.

According to the 2002 census, the village had a total of 245 inhabitants. The only ethnic groups in the village are the Macedonians.
