= Utovo =

Utovo Утово
- Village
- Location within North Macedonia
- Country: North Macedonia
- Region: Pelagonia
- Municipality: Demir Hisar

Population (2002)
  - Total: 35
- Time zone: UTC+1 (CET)
  - Summer (DST): UTC+2 (CEST)
- Website: .

Utovo (Macedonian Cyrillic:Утово) is a village in the municipality of Demir Hisar, North Macedonia.

== Demographics ==
In statistics gathered by Vasil Kanchov in 1900, the village of Utovo was inhabited by 70 Christian Bulgarians.

According to the 2002 census, the village had a total of 35 inhabitants. Ethnic groups in the village include:

- Macedonians 35
