= Golemo Ilino =

Golemo Ilino Големо Илино
- Village
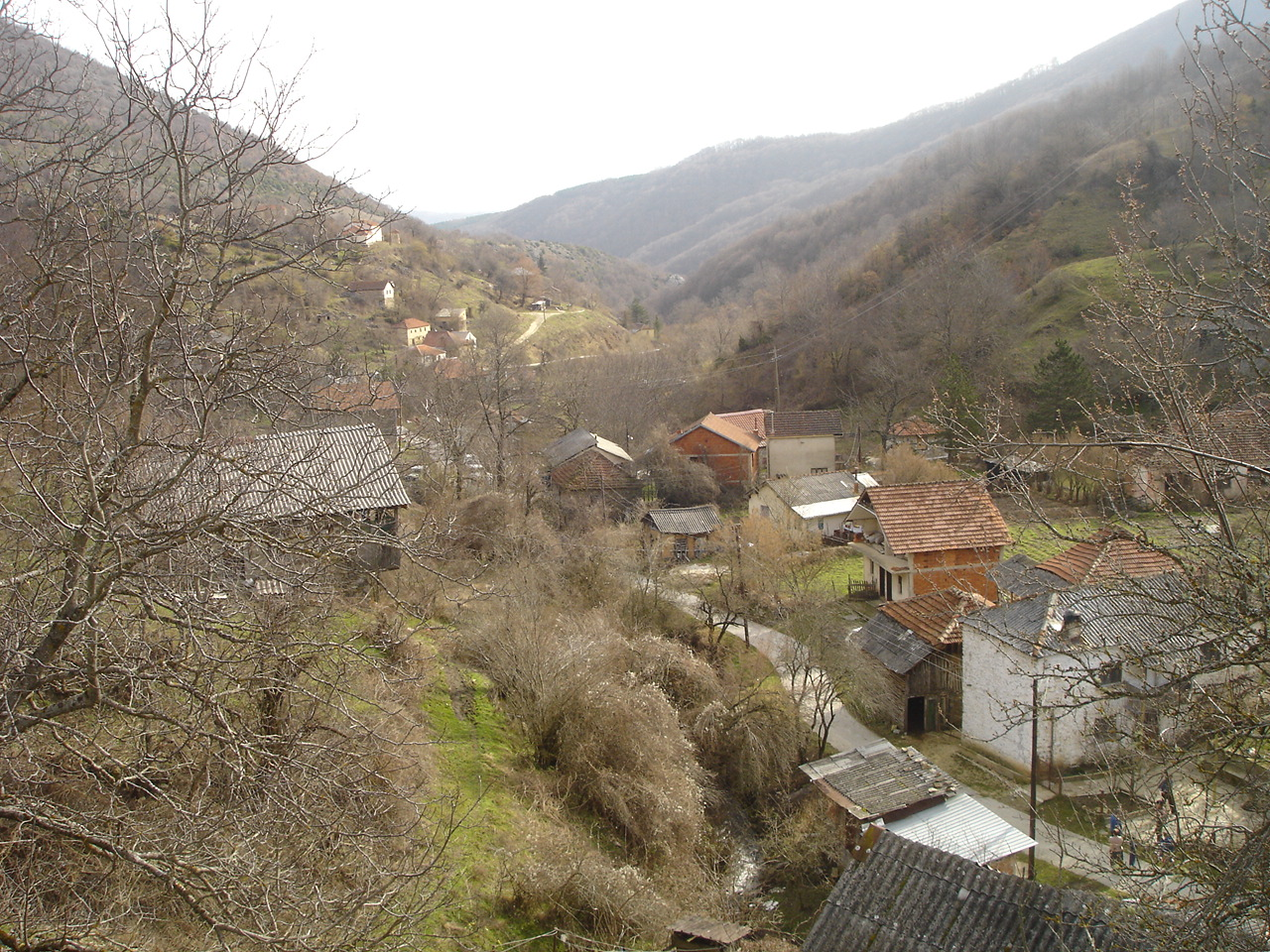

- Location within Republic of North Macedonia
- Coordinates: 41.315556°N 21.097778°E
- Country: North Macedonia
- Region: Pelagonia
- Municipality: Demir Hisar

Population (2002)
  - Total: 52
- Time zone: UTC+1 (CET)
  - Summer (DST): UTC+2 (CEST)
- Car plates: DH
- Website: .

Golemo Ilino (Macedonian: Големо Илино) is a village in the outskirts of the town of Demir Hisar within the municipality of Demir Hisar Municipality, Republic of North Macedonia.

== Demographics ==
in the 1467/1468 Ottoman defter, the village had 53 households and 3 bachelors. A majority of household heads bore Slavic names, while around a quarter bore Albanian and mixed Slavic-Albanian ones. The village was divided in two parts, the smaller of which would eventually become the settlement of Malo Ilino.

In statistics gathered by Vasil Kanchov in 1900, the village of Golemo Ilino was inhabited by 640 Christian Bulgarians.

According to the 2002 census, the village had a total of 52 inhabitants. Ethnic groups in the village include:

- Macedonians 52
