= Velmevci =

Velmevci Велмевци
- Village
- Location within North Macedonia
- Coordinates: 41.346111°N 21.097222°E
- Country: North Macedonia
- Region: Pelagonia
- Municipality: Demir Hisar

Population (2002)
  - Total: 7
- Time zone: UTC+1 (CET)
  - Summer (DST): UTC+2 (CEST)
- Website: .

Velmevci (Macedonian: Велмевци) is a village in the municipality of Demir Hisar, North Macedonia. It used to be part of the former municipality of Sopotnica.

== Demographics ==
Velmevci is attested in the Ottoman defter of 1467/68. Тhe village had 15 households and 2 bachelors. The majority of the inhabitants attested bore typical Christian Slavic anthroponyms, while nearly a fifth of them bore Albanian or mixed Slavic-Albanian anthroponyms.

In statistics gathered by Vasil Kanchov in 1900, the village of Velmevci was inhabited by 800 Christian Bulgarians.

According to the 2002 census, the village had a total of 7 inhabitants, all of whom were ethnic Macedonians.
