= Suvo Grlo, Demir Hisar =

Suvo Grlo Суво Грло
- Village
- Location within North Macedonia
- Country: North Macedonia
- Region: Pelagonia
- Municipality: Demir Hisar

Population (2002)
  - Total: 8
- Time zone: UTC+1 (CET)
  - Summer (DST): UTC+2 (CEST)
- Website: .

Suvo Grlo (Macedonian Cyrillic: Суво Грло) is a village in the municipality of Demir Hisar, North Macedonia.

== Demographics ==
In the 1467/1468 defter the village had 13 households, 1 bachelor and 1 widow. The household heads almost entirely bore Slavic names, with one case of an Albanian name.

In statistics gathered by Vasil Kanchov in 1900, the village of Suvo Grlo was inhabited by 55 Christian Bulgarians.

According to the 2002 census, the village had a total of 8 inhabitants. Ethnic groups in the village include:

- Macedonians 8
