= Rastojca =

Rastojca Растојца
- Village
- Location within North Macedonia
- Country: North Macedonia
- Region: Pelagonia
- Municipality: Demir Hisar

Population (2002)
  - Total: 19
- Time zone: UTC+1 (CET)
  - Summer (DST): UTC+2 (CEST)
- Website: .

Rastojca (Macedonian Cyrillic: Растојца) is a village in the municipality of Demir Hisar, North Macedonia.

== Demographics ==
In the 1467/1468 defter the village had 24 households, 2 bachelors and 2 widows. The household heads almost entirely bore Slavic names, with a minority having Albanian names.

In statistics gathered by Vasil Kanchov in 1900, the village of Rastojca was inhabited by 170 Christian Bulgarians.

According to the 2002 census, the village had a total of 19 inhabitants. Ethnic groups in the village include:

- Macedonians 19
