= Kočište =

Kočište Кочиште
- Village
- Location within North Macedonia
- Coordinates: 41.3444°N 21.1725°E
- Country: North Macedonia
- Region: Pelagonia
- Municipality: Demir Hisar

Population (2002)
  - Total: 38
- Time zone: UTC+1 (CET)
  - Summer (DST): UTC+2 (CEST)
- Website: .

Kočište (Macedonian: Кочиште) is a village in the municipality of Demir Hisar, North Macedonia.

== Demographics ==
In the 1467/1468 Ottoman defter, the village appears as having 25 households and 2 bachelors. Of the inhabitants attested, one half bore typical Slavic anthroponyms while the other carried Albanian or mixed Slavic-Albanian ones.

In statistics gathered by Vasil Kanchov in 1900, the village of Kočište was inhabited by 200 Muslim Albanians and 120 Christian Bulgarians.

According to the 2002 census, the village had a total of 266 inhabitants. Ethnic groups in the village include:

- Macedonians 38
