= Petre M. Andreevski =

Macedonian writer

Petre Mito Andreevski
- Born: Петре Андреевски; June 25, 1934; Sloeštica, Kingdom of Yugoslavia
- Died: September 25, 2006 (aged 72); Skopje, Macedonia
- Resting place: Sloeštica
- Citizenship: Macedonian, Yugoslav
- Education: University of Skopje
- Occupations: writer, academic
- Writing career
- Language: Macedonian
- Period: Modern Macedonian literature
- Notable work: Pirej, Nebeska Timjanova
- Notable awards: 11 October, Brothers Miladinov, Stale Popov, Kočo Racin

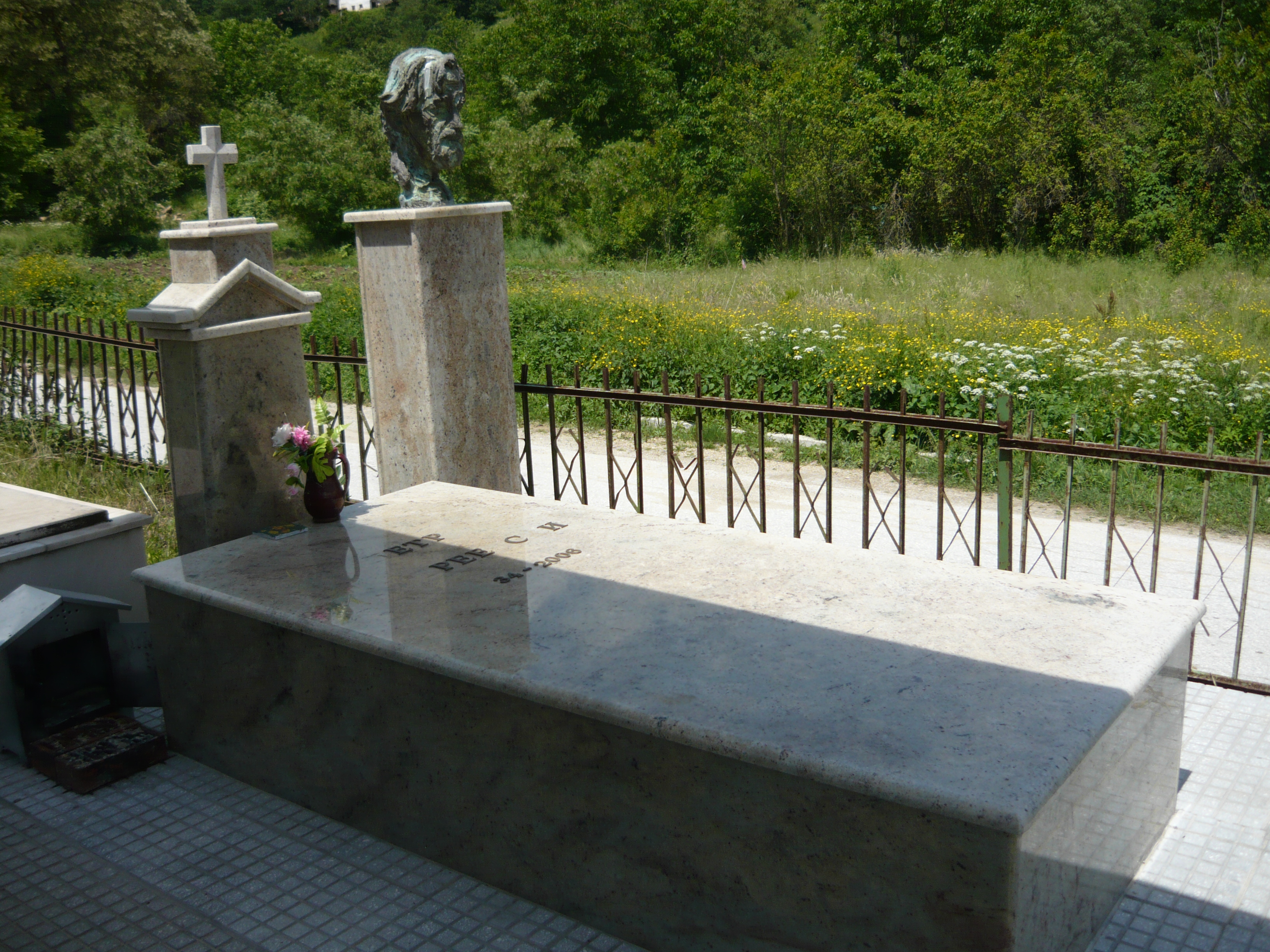
The tomb of Petre M. Andreevski in Sloeštica, Demir Hisar.

Petre Mito Andreevski (Macedonian: Петре Мито Андреевски; June 25, 1934 – September 25, 2006) was a Macedonian poet, novelist, short story writer and playwright. His most famous novel is the historical novel Pirej (1980) and his most famous poetry collection is Denicija (1968).

== Background ==
Andreevski was born in 1934 in the village of Sloeštica, Demir Hisar, in the Kingdom of Yugoslavia (now North Macedonia). He attended elementary school in his native village, high school in Bitola, studied at the Faculty of Philosophy (now Philology) in Skopje. He worked as an editor with the Macedonian National Television and later was an editor of the periodical Razgledi. He has been a member of the Macedonian Academy of Sciences and Arts (MANU) since May 2000. Andreevski was also a member of the Macedonian Writers' Association.

Several selections of his literary opus have been published. In 1984 his selected works were published in four volumes. He has been included in all anthologies of Macedonian poetry both at home and abroad. His works, in separate books, have been presented in over 30 languages.

Andreevski died in Skopje in September 2006 and was buried in his birthplace Sloeštica.

== Literary output ==
- Poetry: Knots (1960), Both on Heaven and Earth (1962), Denicija (1968), Dalni nakovalni (1971), Praises and Complaints(1975), Eternal House (1987); Lachrymatory (1999).
- Short story collections: The Seventh Day (1994), Years of Treason (1974), All Faces of Death (1994).
- Novels: Pirej (1980), Locusts (1983) Nebeska Timjanovna (1988) and Last Villagers (1987).
- Plays: Plays (1987) includes Time for Singing and Bogunemili.
- Books for children: Scribble Riddle, Eat and Grow.

== Awards ==
Andreevski has won several important awards as part of his literary work in Macedonian literature. Some of the most important ones include “11 October”, “Miladinov Brothers” (twice), “Kočo Racin” and “Stale Popov” (twice).

== See also ==
- Pirej
- Macedonian writers
- Macedonian literature
