= Radovo, Demir Hisar =

Radovo Радово
- Village
- Air view of the village

- Location within North Macedonia
- Coordinates: 41.321944°N 21.168333°E
- Country: North Macedonia
- Region: Pelagonia
- Municipality: Demir Hisar

Population (2002)
  - Total: 13
- Time zone: UTC+1 (CET)
  - Summer (DST): UTC+2 (CEST)
- Website: .

Radovo (Macedonian: Радово) is a village in the municipality of Demir Hisar, North Macedonia.

== Demographics ==
in the 1467/1468 Ottoman defter, the village had 12 households and 2 widow. The onomastics consisted largely of Christian Slavic anthroponyms, with a minority of Albanian ones. In statistics gathered by Vasil Kanchov in 1900, the village of Radovo was inhabited by 250 Christian Bulgarians.

According to the 2002 census, the village had a total of 13 inhabitants. Ethnic groups in the village include:

- Macedonians 13
