= Žvan =

Žvan Жван
- Village
- Air view of the village

- Location within North Macedonia
- Coordinates: 41.286716°N 21.118684°E
- Country: North Macedonia
- Region: Pelagonia
- Municipality: Demir Hisar

Population (2002)
  - Total: 428
- Time zone: UTC+1 (CET)
  - Summer (DST): UTC+2 (CEST)
- Website: .

Žvan (Macedonian: Жван) is a village in the municipality of Demir Hisar, North Macedonia. It used to be part of the former municipality of Sopotnica.

== Demographics ==
Bratin Dol is attested in the Ottoman defter of 1467/68 as a village in the vilayet of Manastir. The village had 60 households, 1 bachelor and 4 widows. The inhabitants attested almost exclusively bore Slavic anthroponyms, with only 3 instances of Albanian or mixed Slavic-Albanian anthroponyms.

According to the 2002 census, the village had a total of 428 inhabitants. Ethnic groups in the village include:

- Macedonians 428
