= Virovo =

Virovo may refer to:

- Virovo, Demir Hisar, North Macedonia
- Virovo (Arilje), Serbia
