= Zašle =

Zašle Зашле
- Village
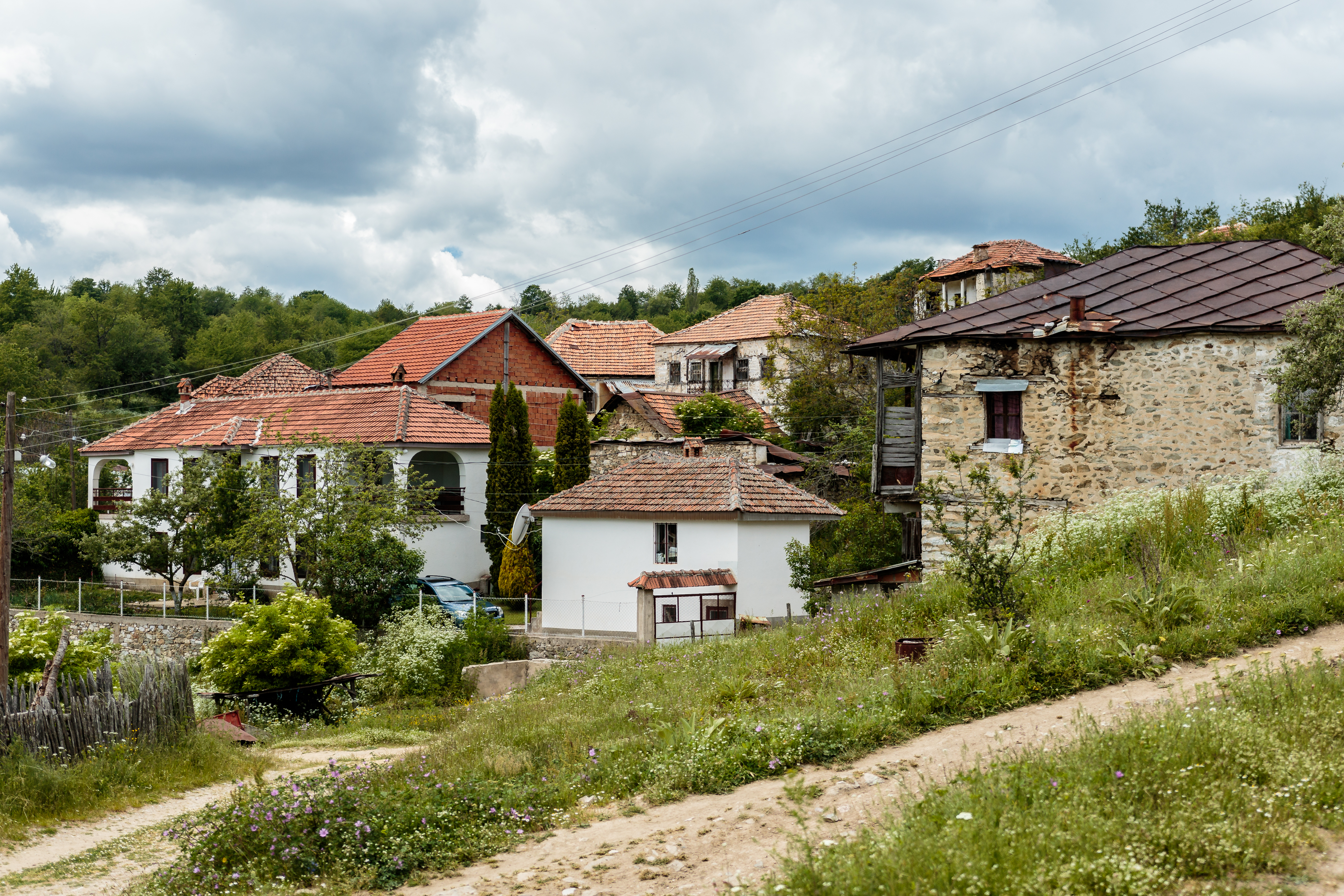

- Location within North Macedonia
- Coordinates: 41.372222°N 21.143056°E
- Country: North Macedonia
- Region: Pelagonia
- Municipality: Demir Hisar

Population (2002)
  - Total: 42
- Time zone: UTC+1 (CET)
  - Summer (DST): UTC+2 (CEST)
- Website: .

Zašle (Macedonian: Зашле) is a village in the municipality of Demir Hisar, North Macedonia.

== Demographics ==
In the 1467/1468 Ottoman defter, the village had 21 households and 2 bachelors. A majority of household heads bore Slavic names, while a minority, around a sixth, bore Albanian ones.

In statistics gathered by Vasil Kanchov in 1900, the village of Zašle was inhabited by 280 Christian Bulgarians.

According to the 2002 census, the village had 42 inhabitants. all of them being Macedonians.
