= Vardino =

Vardino Вардино
- Village
- Air view of the village

- Location within North Macedonia
- Coordinates: 41.236499°N 21.241649°E
- Country: North Macedonia
- Region: Pelagonia
- Municipality: Demir Hisar

Population (2002)
  - Total: 266
- Time zone: UTC+1 (CET)
  - Summer (DST): UTC+2 (CEST)
- Website: .

Vardino (Macedonian: Вардино) is a village in the municipality of Demir Hisar, North Macedonia.

== Demographics ==
In the 1467/1468 Ottoman defter, the village had 33 households, 2 bachelors and 2 widows. The onomastics consisted almost entirely of Christian Slavic anthroponyms, with the exception of 3 cases of the Albanian anthroponym Dushman also being present. In statistics gathered by Vasil Kanchov in 1900, the village of Bardino was inhabited by 200 Christian Bulgarians.

According to the 2002 census, the village had a total of 266 inhabitants. Ethnic groups in the village include:

- Macedonians 266
