= Sladuevo =

Sladuevo Сладуево
- Village
- Air view of the village

- Location within North Macedonia
- Country: North Macedonia
- Region: Pelagonia
- Municipality: Demir Hisar

Population (2002)
  - Total: 77
- Time zone: UTC+1 (CET)
  - Summer (DST): UTC+2 (CEST)
- Website: .

Sladuevo (Macedonian Cyrillic: Сладуево) is a village in the municipality of Demir Hisar, North Macedonia.

== Demographics ==
In the 1467/1468 defter, the village had 5 households and 1 widow. The household heads bore Albanian or mixed Albanian-Slavic names.

According to the 2002 census, the village had a total of 77 inhabitants. Ethnic groups in the village include:

- Macedonians: 77
