= Železnec =

Železnec Железнец
- Village
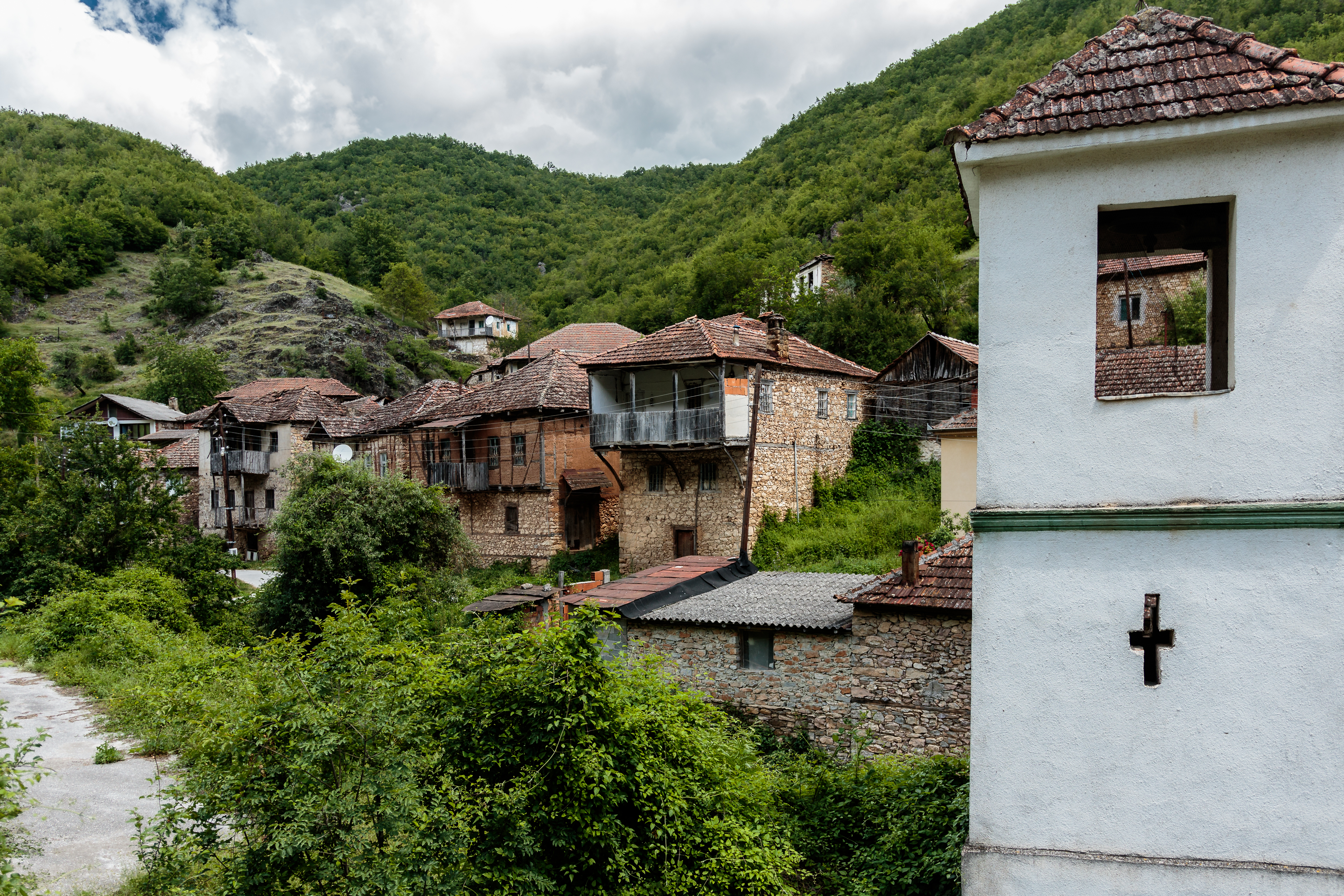

- Location within North Macedonia
- Coordinates: 41.324167°N 21.063056°E
- Country: North Macedonia
- Region: Pelagonia
- Municipality: Demir Hisar

Population (2002)
  - Total: 57
- Time zone: UTC+1 (CET)
  - Summer (DST): UTC+2 (CEST)
- Website: .

Železnec (Macedonian: Железнец) is a village in the municipality of Demir Hisar, North Macedonia.

== Demographics ==
In the 1467/1468 Ottoman defter, the village had 16 households, 1 widow and 1 bachelor. The onomastics consisted of Christian mixed Slavic-Albanian anthroponyms, with a slight predominance for Slavic ones.

In statistics gathered by Vasil Kanchov in 1900, the village of Železnec was inhabited by 320 Christian Bulgarians.

According to the 2002 census, the village had a total of 57 inhabitants. Ethnic groups in the village include:

- Macedonians 57
