= Pirej =

1980 novel by Petre M. Andreevski

Pireј
- Author: Petre M. Andreevski
- Original title: Пиреј
- Language: Macedonian
- Genre: drama, historical novel
- Publication date: 1980
- Publication place: North Macedonia
- Media type: printed
- Pages: 252 (Macedonian version)

Pirej (Macedonian: Пиреј, transl. couch grass) is a novel by Macedonian author Petre M. Andreevski published in 1980. The novel, set during the period of the Balkan Wars, World War I and the period after, tells the story of Jon and Velika, a couple living in a village in southern Macedonia. The novel's title translated to couch grass refers to the perseverance and stoicism of Macedonian people through history. In modern day, Pirej is considered to be the author's magnum opus and one of the main and most important works written in Macedonian during the 20th century. It has been translated to Croatian, English, Russian and German.

== Plot ==
The novel opens at Velika's funeral which is attended by her sixth child Roden Meglenoski. As he does not know much about his parents, he cannot understand why his mother refused to be buried next to his father. Duko Vendija, one of the other people who is present at the funeral retells him the story as he heard it from Roden's parents.

=== Jon's part ===
Jon starts telling his part of the story, reminiscing of his poor and unfortunate childhood mainly marked by his father's ruthlessness; he sent his wife back to her parents when she got sick because he did not want her in his house. He makes them say their last goodbyes to her, sends them off to the monastery and loses all contact with them. As time goes on, Jon grows up and has a more mature outlook on life. He finds shelter and support in priest Visarion who encourages him to learn and become literate. Unfortunately, his peaceful life at the monastery comes to an end with the arrival of the komiti who kill the priest, convincing Jon to join them. Since then his life becomes hard but he makes attempts to continue living normally as well. When choosing a wife, he only looked for force and hard-work in women; that's why he decided to take Velika when he sees the strength with which she works on the fields.

== Background ==
The title of the novel is used as a symbol for the perseverance and stoicism of Macedonians through history and their unwillingness to vanish as a nation from the world; this is also the main idea that drives the novel. The story of this novel follows the life and the sufferings of a married couple, Jon and Velika, from southern Macedonia (currently officially North Macedonia), who are separated due to the Balkan Wars. Most events take place during World War I, while a few also occur before and after that. Many foreign armies were present in the country at the period including Serbian, Bulgarian, French, English, German and Austrian, so the novel mainly focuses on Macedonian soldiers recruited by those armies.

== Elements and symbolism ==
The plot is told through three different views. It starts off with a chapter narrated by Duko Vendija and it also ends with a chapter told by him. Fourteen other chapters are told by Jon and Velika's perspectives respectively, where they describe their lives in first person singular. In the beginning, events are chronologically told, in the middle during the spouses' separation events occur in a parallel manner and the book ends off chronologically again.

In the book, argues Macedonian scholar Jovanka Denkova, the Macedonian man is represented as a "marionette, fighting for different sides [armies] alternatively". She argues that Velika is the true symbol of pirej as she goes through all the accidents life brings to her, including the death of her children, murders in her village and her husband's domestic abuse among others.

== Translation and adaptations ==
The book is considered to be Andreevski's most important work. An English translation of the book by Australian translators Will Firth and Mirjana Simjanovska was released through Pollitecon Publications in 2009. The book has also been translated to Russian by Olga Pankina, director of the Macedonian cultural center in Moscow.

The novel has been adapted as a play twice. The premiere of the second theatrical adaptation of the novel was on 27 April 2018 at the Vojdan Chernodrinski theater in Prilep and was directed by Ljupcho Gjorgievski.

== See also ==
- Macedonian literature
