= Yordan Piperkata =

Bulgarian revolutionary

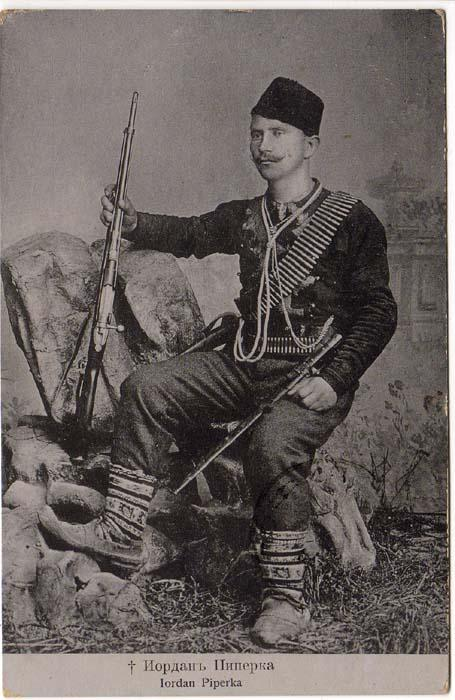
- Portrait of Yordan Piperkata
- Born: August 23, 1870; Kozica, near Kičevo, Ottoman Empire (now North Macedonia)
- Died: August 22, 1903 (aged 32); Cer, Ottoman Empire, (now North Macedonia)
- Organization: Internal Macedonian Revolutionary Organization

Yordan Piperkov (Bulgarian: Йордан Силянов Пиперков; Macedonian: Јордан Силјанов Пиперков; 1870–1903), widely known as Yordan Piperkata (Bulgarian: Йордан Пиперката, Macedonian: Јордан Пиперката), was a Macedonian Bulgarian revolutionary from the early 20th century, member of the Supreme Macedonian-Adrianople Committee and later of the Internal Macedonian-Adrianople Revolutionary Organization (IMARO).

== Life ==
He was born in Kozica, Ottoman Empire (today in Kičevo Municipality, North Macedonia) to a poor family. He could not graduate at the Bulgarian secondary school in Bitola, because his family moved to Sofia, Bulgaria, where he met insurgents from the Kresna-Razlog Uprising and other vojvods. This sparked in him an interest for the Macedonian liberation movement. Later Piperkata was active in the Supreme Macedonian Committee chetas' action in 1895 in Ottoman Macedonia. He joined the Internal Macedonian-Adrianople Revolutionary Organization in 1897. The assassination of a Turkish bey, in which he also participated, forced him to leave Ottoman Macedonia and return to Bulgaria. With the detachment of Mirche Atsev, he returned to Macedonia in June 1900, after which he formed his own detachment in the Krushevo region. Afterwards he several times entered Macedonia from Bulgaria with different chetas. During the Ilinden uprising, he attacked the Albanian village of Pribilci with 900 insurgents, then fought near Kicevo. After the burning of the village of Cer by the Ottomans, Piperkata and three other rebels went to investigate the damages in the burned village, where Piperkata was killed by Turks, who had organized an ambush there. After the death of Yordan, his assistant, the Bulgarian Army officer Dimitar Dechev, took his place. Dechev took revenge against the Turks for Yordan's murder. He was buried on a hill in the vicinity of the village of Velmevci.

In 1943 when Vardar Macedonia was annexed by Bulgaria, his widow, Ruzha Silyanova, then 64 years old, submitted an application under the Law on granting national pensions to especially meritorious workers of the liberation struggles, which was approved by the Council of Ministers of the Kingdom of Bulgaria. At the same time on his grave was erected a monument by the Bulgarian authorities.

== Sources ==
- "Революционната дейность въ Демирхисаръ (битолско) по спомени на Алексо Стефановъ Демирхисарски войвода)", Съобщава Боянъ Мирчев, София—Печатница П.Глушковъ — 1931 стр.27-29
- "Илюстрация Илинден", година І, брой 3, стр. 13, 14
