= Boište =

Boište Боиште
- Village
- Air view of the village

- Location within Republic of North Macedonia
- Coordinates: 41.196111°N 21.100278°E
- Country: North Macedonia
- Region: Pelagonia
- Municipality: Demir Hisar

Population (2021)
  - Total: 2
- Time zone: UTC+1 (CET)
  - Summer (DST): UTC+2 (CEST)
- Car plates: DH
- Website: .

Boište (Macedonian: Боиште) is a village in the outskirts of the town of Demir Hisar within the municipality of Demir Hisar Municipality, Republic of North Macedonia.

== Demographics ==
in the 1467/1468 Ottoman defter, the village had 30 households, 2 widow and 2 bachelors. A majority of household heads bore Slavic names, while around a quarter bore Albanian and mixed Slavic-Albanian ones.

In statistics gathered by Vasil Kanchov in 1900, the village of Boište was inhabited by 650 Christian Bulgarians.

According to the 2002 census, the village had a total of 7 inhabitants. Ethnic groups in the village include:

- Macedonians 7

According to the last census of 2021, there were 2 Macedonians living in the village.
