= Demirhisar =

Demirhisar may refer to:

- Demirhisar, former Turkish name of Sidirokastro, a town in Greece
- MV Demirhisar (1873), a Turkish merchant ship in service from 1938 to 1985

== See also ==
- Demir Hisar (disambiguation)
