= Cerovo, Demir Hisar =

Cerovo Церово
- Village
- Location within North Macedonia
- Country: North Macedonia
- Region: Pelagonia
- Municipality: Demir Hisar

Population (2002)
  - Total: 2
- Time zone: UTC+1 (CET)
  - Summer (DST): UTC+2 (CEST)
- Website: .

Cerovo (Macedonian Cyrillic: Церово) is a village in the municipality of Demir Hisar, North Macedonia.

== Demographics ==
In the 1467/1468 defter the village had 24 households and 2 widows. The household heads almost entirely bore Slavic names, while a small minority Albanian.

In statistics gathered by Vasil Kanchov in 1900, the village of Cerovo was inhabited by 195 Christian Bulgarians.

According to the 2002 census, the village had a total of 2 inhabitants. Ethnic groups in the village include:

- Macedonians 2
