= Kičevo =

Kičevo Кичево (Macedonian) Kërçovë/Kërçova (Albanian)
- Town
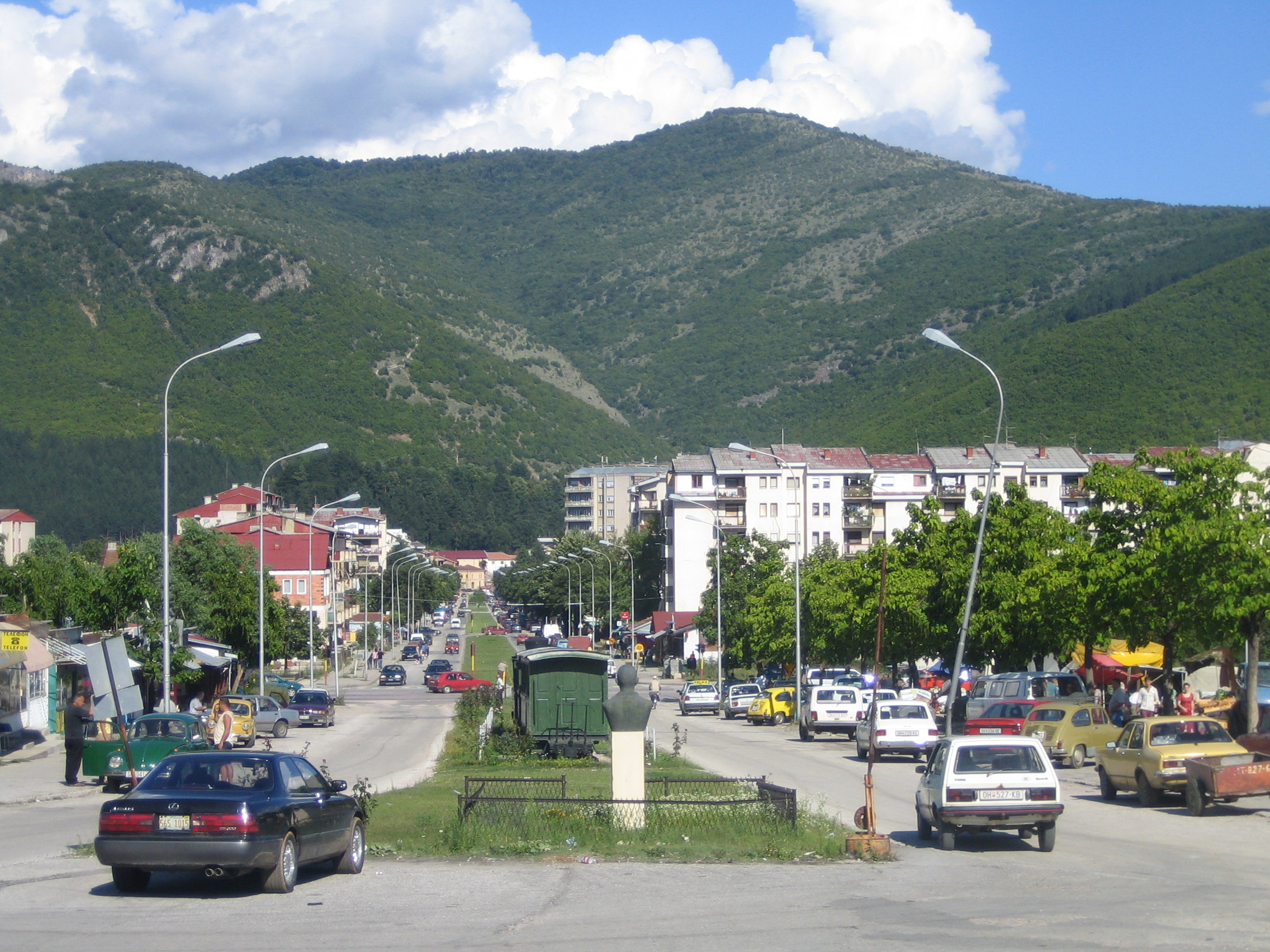
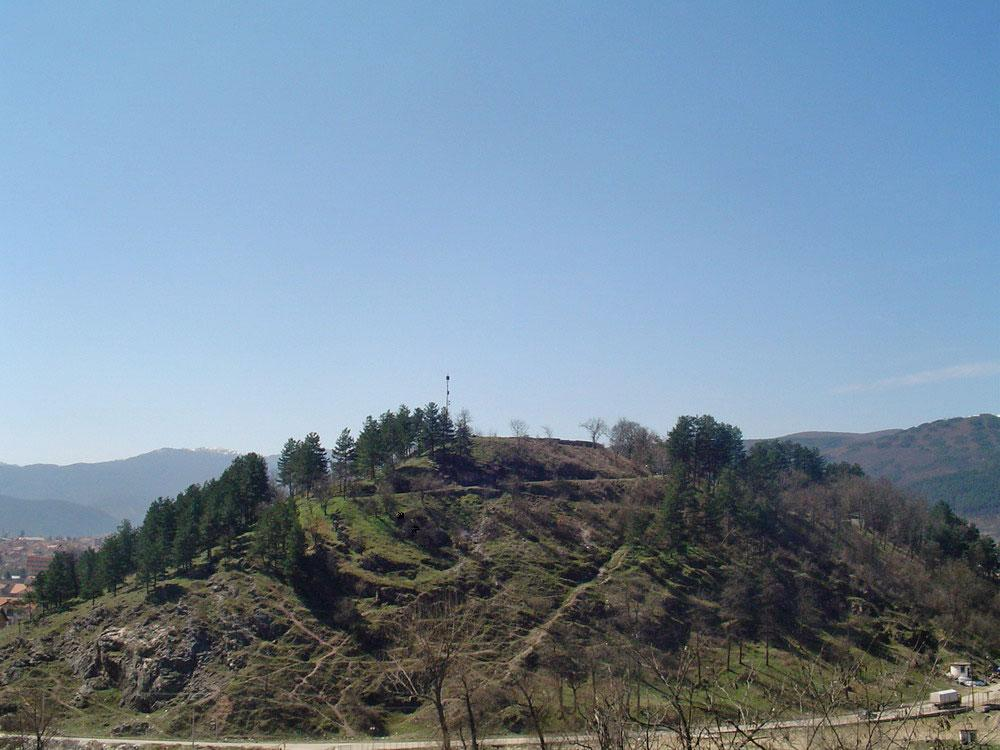
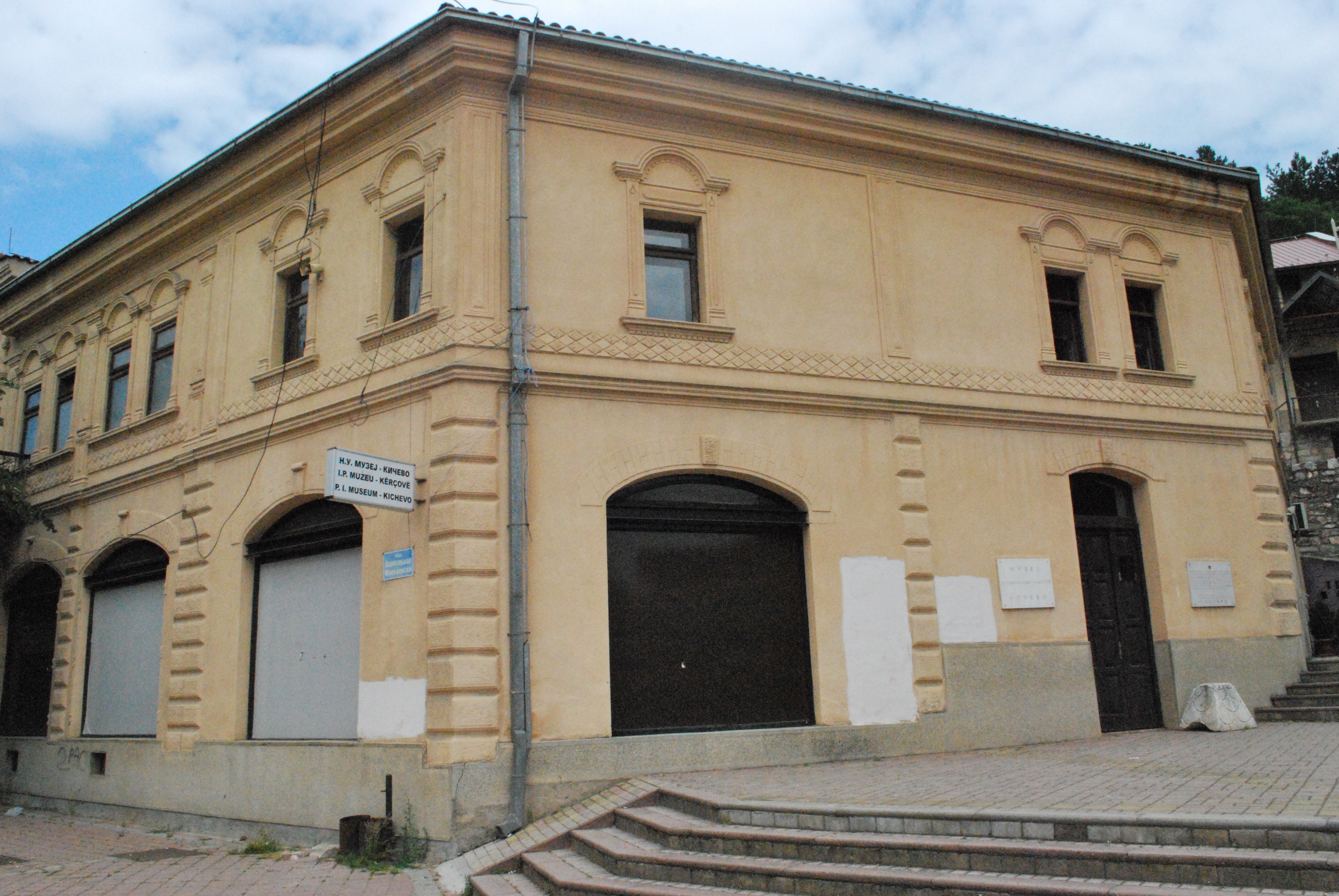
- From the top, Osloboduvanje Boulevard, Kitino Kale, Museum of West Macedonia in the National Liberation War

- Flag Seal

- Location within North Macedonia
- Coordinates: 41°31′04″N 20°57′56″E
- Country: North Macedonia
- Region: Southwestern
- Municipality: Kičevo

Government
  - Mayor: Aleksandar Jovanovski (VMRO-DPMNE)

Area
  - Total: 814.3 km^{2} (314.4 sq mi)

Population (2021)
  - Total: 23,428
- Time zone: UTC+1 (CET)
  - Summer (DST): UTC+2 (CEST)
- Postal code: 6250
- Area code: +389
- Vehicle registration: KI
- Climate: Cfb

Kičevo (Macedonian: Кичево [ˈkitʃɛvɔ]; Albanian: Kërçovë, Albanian definite form: Kërçova) is a city in the western part of North Macedonia, located in a valley in the south-eastern slopes of Mount Bistra, between the cities of Ohrid and Gostivar. The capital Skopje is 112 km away. The city of Kičevo is the seat of Kičevo Municipality.

== Name ==
The name of the city in Macedonian and other South Slavic languages is Kičevo (Кичево). The name of the city in Albanian is Kërçovë. It was originally known as Uskana and was inhabited by the Illyrian tribe of the Penestae. It is presumed that the present name of the town originates from the name of this settlement populated by the Slavic Berziti tribe. In Turkish, the city is known as Kırçova. Kicevo was first mentioned as Uskana (Ωξάνα in Ancient Greek) in the reign of Perseus, king of Macedon during the Third Macedonian War (171–169 BC). The next written record of the town did not come until 1018, under the name of Kitzabis (from Kίτζαβις in Byzantine Greek), or sometimes as Kitsabis or Kitsavis or Kitzbon, or slavicised as Kicavis, noted in one of the documents of the Byzantine emperor Basil II. Under the rule of Prince Marko it was known as Katin Grad ("Katina's City") due to Marko's sister being named Katina.

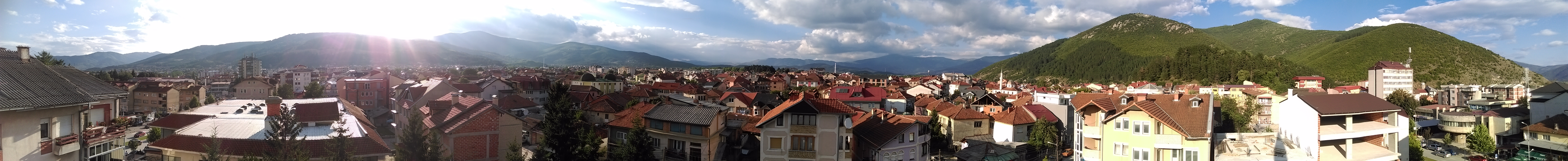
Panorama of Kičevo

== History ==
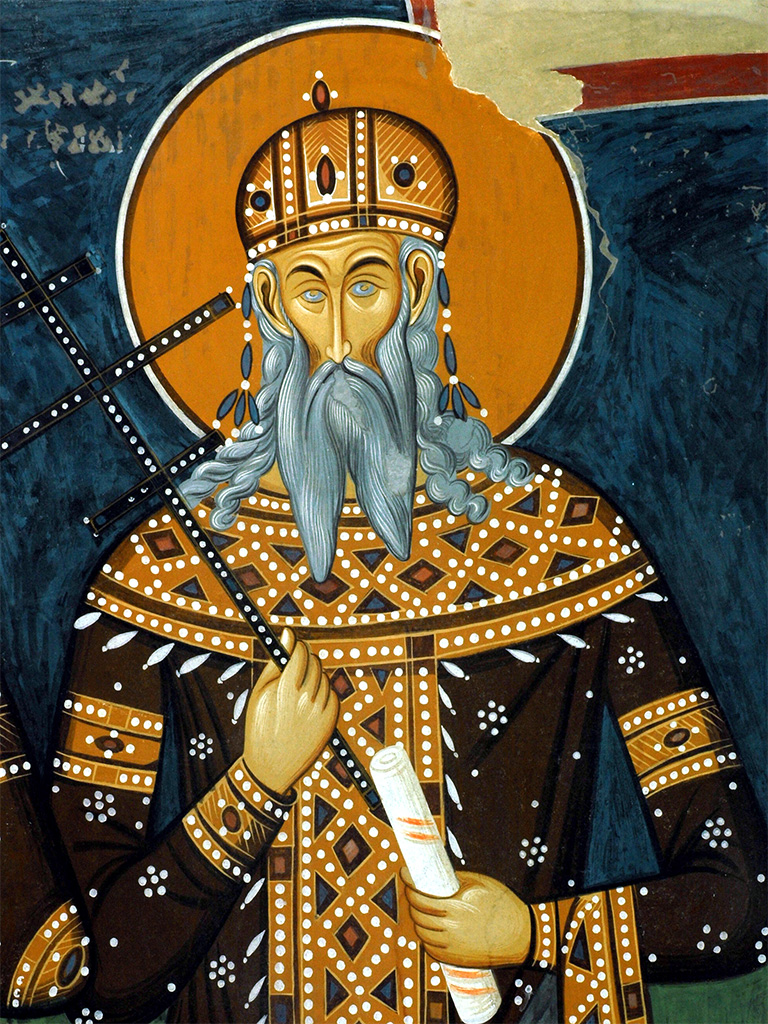
King Vukašin ruled the city alongside his son Prince Marko

=== Medieval period ===
Kičevo was noted in one of the documents of the Byzantine emperor Basil II in 1018, and also mentioned by the Ohrid archbishop Theophilact in the 11th century. The city would become a part of the First Bulgarian Empire and it was one of the first cities to be added to the Archbishopric of Ohrid. It was also a part of the Second Bulgarian Empire. The city first fell under Serbian rule during the reign of Stefan Uroš I and finally under Stefan Milutin in 1283. After the downfall of the Serbian Empire the city was under the rule of Vukašin of Serbia of the Mrnjavčević family after which it passed to his son Prince Marko and finally to the Ottomans.

=== Ottoman period ===
When the region was conquered by the Ottoman Empire, Kičevo was turned into the military and administrative center of the region. According to Toma Smiljanić-Bradina, the local Slavs of the region still lived in a semi-independent fashion as they did under the rule of Prince Marko retaining their status as "earthly lords" of their fortresses. This semi-independent way of life persisted until the 15th century.

According to local folklore the inhabitants of the region also participated in the Christian rebellions during the Great Turkish War and were forced to flee after its failure.

On August 2, 1903, the Christian citizens of Kičevo participated in the Ilinden Uprising, led by Arso Vojvoda and Yordan Piperkata.

=== Modern ===
In 1913 Kičevo and the whole region were incorporated in the Kingdom of Serbia. The city was occupied by the Kingdom of Bulgaria during World War I. It became part of the Kingdom of Serbs, Croats and Slovenes in 1918. From 1929 to 1941, Kičevo was part of the Vardar Banovina of the Kingdom of Yugoslavia.

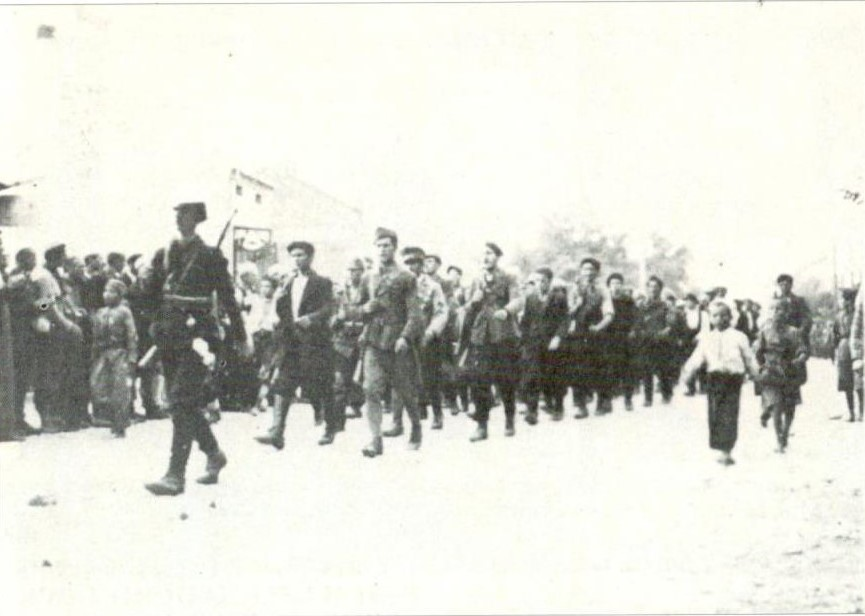
Macedonian Partisans entering Kičevo on September 9, 1943, after the capitulation of Italy.

During World War II, Kičevo was occupied by forces from Fascist Italy and ceded to the Italian protectorate of Albania. On September 9, 1943, after the Armistice of Cassibile, Macedonian and Albanian partisan units disarmed the Italian garrison and took temporary control of the city. However, soon after the capitulation of Italy, Nazi Germany occupied that area. The Germans put Balli Kombëtar in charge of Albania under German rule. The city was finally seized by the Communist Guerillas on November 15, 1944, after German retreat.

From 1945 to 1991 the town belonged to the Socialist Federal Republic of Yugoslavia, as part of its constituent Socialist Republic of Macedonia. Since 1991 the town has been part of the Republic of Macedonia.

== Demographics ==
In the 1467-1468 Ottoman defter, (Note: The names of the defter are: Bojko son of Progon; Pejo son of Progon Koja son of Progon; Tanush son of Novak; Tan-ça (Tan) son of Gjurko; Kala brother of Ragan -in; Ragan's brother Gjini; Stojko son of Dominiko, Tan-o son of Stojko; Radush son of Dominiko; Tush-o son of Bojçin; Dimitri son of Kaliçko; Drago son of Deshgur; Stojko son of Deshkur; Tushko (Tush) son of Kaliçko; Jovan son of Kaliçko; Nikola son of Kaliçko; Niko son of Capanik; Tan-o son of Niko; Dimitri son of Vlad; Gjuro son of Dimitri; Nikola son of Dimitr; Tush-son of Mala (Malja); Dimitri (govedar); Mihal son of Vlad; Tush-ko son of Stojko; Dimitri son of Stojko-s; Bogdan son of Ton-ça; Tush-o son of Bojçin; Nikola son of Petro; Niko son of Todor; Pejo son of Dimitri; Bojka son of Mariq) Kičevo was divided into two mahallas (neighbourhoods): The Mahale-i Arnavut (Albanian neighbourhood), where the heads of families appear with symbiotic Albanian-Christian-Slavic anthroponomy and the overwhelming majority of the population appeared to be of Albanian origin, and the Serbian mahala, where some Albanian names also appear, in conjunction with a majority of Slavic ones.

According to Vasil Kanchov in 1900, the city had a population of 4,844, of which 1,200 were Bulgarian Christians, 3,560 were Bulgarian Muslims, and 84 Roma, with Albanians being present in the surrounding villages.

According to the 1942 Albanian census, Kičevo was inhabited by a total of 7,216 people, 5,569 of whom were Muslim Albanians, 883 Serbian-speaking Orthodox Albanians, 600 Bulgarians and 164 Serbs.

=== Modern ===
The city has 27,076 inhabitants. The largest ethnic group in the city of Kičevo is the Macedonians who constitute for 15,031 people (55.5%), followed by the Albanians with 7,641 people (28.2%), the Turks with about 2,406 (8.9%) and Roma with 4.9%.

Orthodox Christians made up 15,139 (55.9%) of the city's population according to the 2002 census, while Muslims were the second-largest religious group in the city, numbering 11,759 (43.4%).

The most common native languages are Macedonian (62.5%), Albanian (28.2%), Turkish (8.0%) and Romani 0.4%.

City of Kičevo population according to ethnic group 1948-2021
Ethnic group	census 1948		census 1953		census 1961		census 1971		census 1981		census 1994		census 2002		census 2021	
Ethnic group	Number	%	Number	%	Number	%	Number	%	Number	%	Number	%	Number	%	Number	%
Macedonians	..	..	3,747	39.2	6,809	66.0	9,900	64.3	13,236	58.9	15,255	60.7	15,031	55.5	12,687	54.2
Albanians	..	..	232	2.4	681	6.6	2,284	14.9	4,516	20.1	5,902	23.5	7,641	28.2	5,110	21.8
Turks	..	..	4,749	49.7	2,079	20.2	2,041	13.3	2,175	9.7	2,175	8.7	2,406	8.9	2,069	8.8
Romani	..	..	54	0.6	0	0.0	17	0.1	304	1.3	1,235	4.9	1,329	4.9	1,775	7.6
Serbs	..	..	484	5.1	394	3.8	305	2.0	203	0.9	96	0.4	82	0.3	49	0.2
Vlachs	..	..	4	0.1	0	0.0	0	0.0	5	0.0	15	0.1	75	0.3	67	0.2
Bosniaks	..	..	0	0.0	0	0.0	0	0.0	0	0.0	0	0.0	7	0.0	8	0.0
Others	..	..	297	3.1	394	3.5	846	5.5	2,040	9.1	451	1.8	496	1.8	164	0.7
Persons for whom data are taken from administrative sources															1,499	6.4
Total	7,280		9,567		10,324		15,393		22,479		25,129		27,076		23,428	

== Culture ==
=== Мacedonian traditional clothing ===
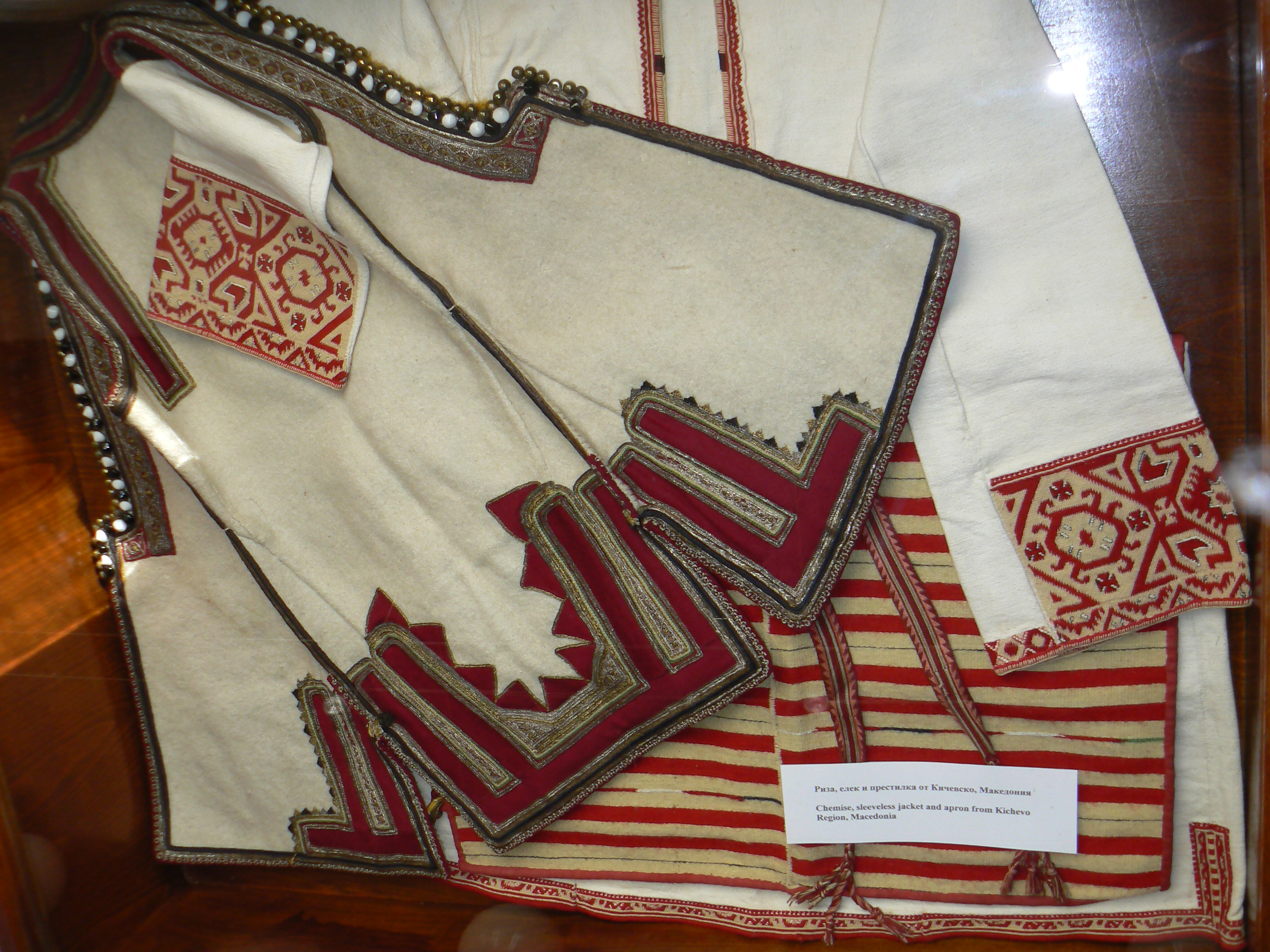
Shirt and bodice from Kičevo

The characteristics of the traditional clothing are massive embroiders on the shirt, collar and sleeves, white and black top garments, several types of head coverings, richly decorated skirts and several different regional varieties of pants and coats, in Kičevo specifically waist sashes are worn, fur coats, decorated collars, embroidered cuffs and fur coats.

=== Albanian traditional clothing ===
The Kičevo area maintains a unique composition of traditional Albanian clothing. Unlike the Albanian dialects of the region, the traditional clothing of the Albanians in Kičevo are unitary; rather, diversity is shown varying on gender, age, and situation. Examples of this include the lower part of men's clothing which is characterised by the tirqe; the colour of the tirqe varied depending on age, with youth usually wearing white tirqe and the older men wearing dark brown tirqe. Women wear a shami (headscarf), which exists in several forms. Depending on the occasion, a shami can be red or white, but white scarves are preferred. The Brezi (belt) was not only used for decoration, but also as a symbol of the level of burrni (manhood) of its wearer as well as to store tobacco and related objects. The brezi of grown married women is usually tighter and typically white, decorated with a variety of ornaments. Young girls wore a black brez, and elderly women wore a reddish brez.

=== Monuments ===
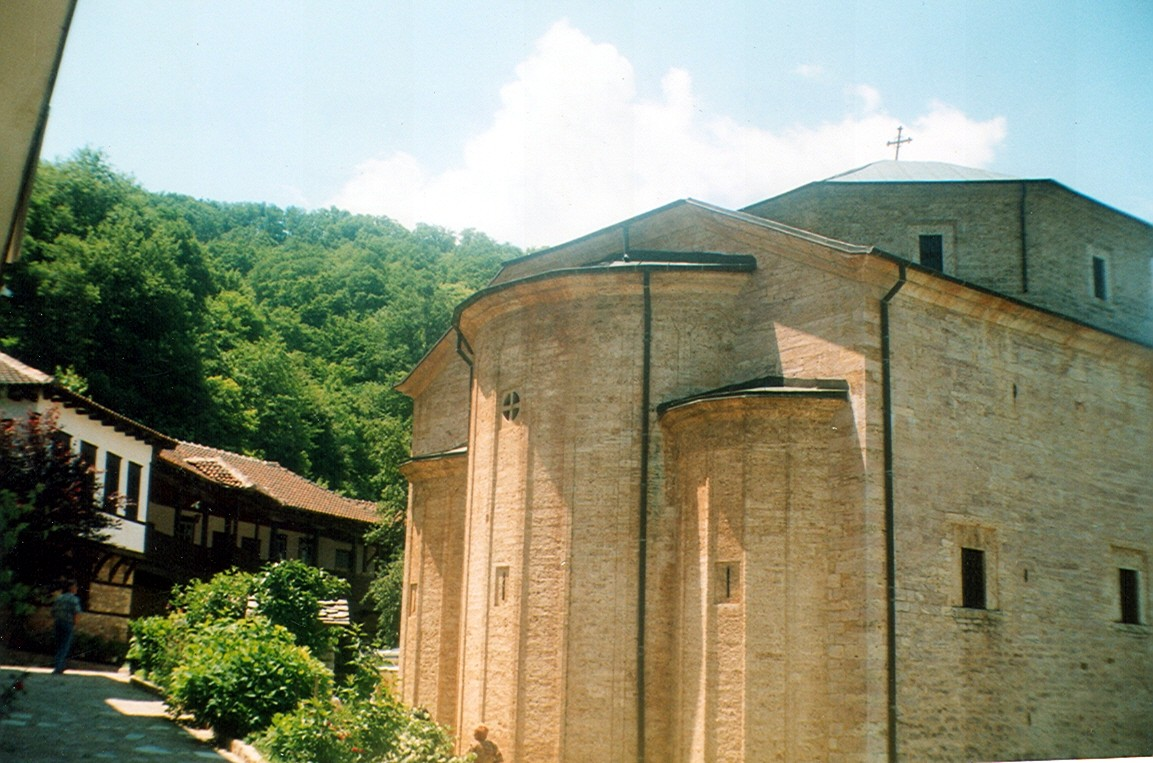
Monastery of St. Bogorodica Prečista near Kičevo.

Monastery of St. Bogorodica Prečista (Monastery of Immaculate Mother of God) is a significant monastery near Kičevo. Dedicated to the Virgin Mary, Mother of God, the feast day of this monastery is "Mala Bogorodica", (Birthday of the Virgin Mary on the 21st of September). The monastery, dedicated to the Annunciation and lodgings for devout female monks, represents a medieval monastery that was known under the name Krninski monastery in the past.

This monastery is actually an important site for the study of common cult of Christians and Muslims because it is visited by believers from both religions. The reason of this common cult is due to the miraculous powers of the water source inside the monastery.

Another important monument is the monastery of St. George located in the vicinity of Kičevo.

There are also many important mosques from the Ottoman Empire's times of rule and from the Muslim population.

== Sports ==
Local football club FK Napredok has spent several seasons in the Macedonian First Football League and defunct club KF Vëllazërimi 77 currently not playing in any of the four highest tiers of Macedonian football, Replaced by KF Vëllazërimi J 1977 currently plays in the Macedonian Third League.

== Twin towns - twin cities ==
- Vratsa – Bulgaria
- Óbuda-Békásmegyer – Hungary

== Notable people ==
- Besart Ibraimi, footballer
- Andrea Beleska, handballer
- Florian Kadriu, footballer
- Xhelil Asani, footballer
- Omer Kaleshi, painter
- Jakub Selimoski, Grand Mufti of Yugoslavia (1989-1993)
- Yoakim Karchovski, priest
- Vlatko Lozanoski, singer
- Vesna Milošević, former handballer
- Vlado Taneski, journalist and serial killer
- Kaliopi, singer
- Martina Dimoska, analog astronaut
- Ali Ahmeti, politician
- Saint Evnuvios, Paisios and Averikios
- Sali Ramadani, politician
