= Sali Ramadani =

Albanian politician

Sali Ramadani (Macedonian: Сали Рамадани) (1939 - 27 January 2018) was an Albanian politician and deputy of the Assembly of North Macedonia.

== Biography ==
He was born in 1939 Kërçova to an ethnic Albanian family. During the Yugoslav era, Ramadani operated as a political dissident and lawyer who legally defended persecuted Albanian activists and fought against systemic discrimination. He also participated in underground networks aimed at preserving Albanian national identity and was also imprisoned by the repressive regime. After the Breakup of Yugoslavia, he became a member of the Assembly of North Macedonia. Ramadani was part of the Party for Democratic Prosperity. On 8 July 1997, he unfurled the Albanian flag in the Macedonian parliament, which sparked controversy among the media and Macedonian lawyers; Ramadani was also criticized by the Speaker of Parliament Tito Petkovski. He later became part of the Democratic Party of Albanians. On 27 January 2018, Ramadani died.
