= Kičevo Monastery =

Macedonian Orthodox monastery in Kičevo, North Maceedonia

Coordinates: 41°30′02″N 21°00′27″E

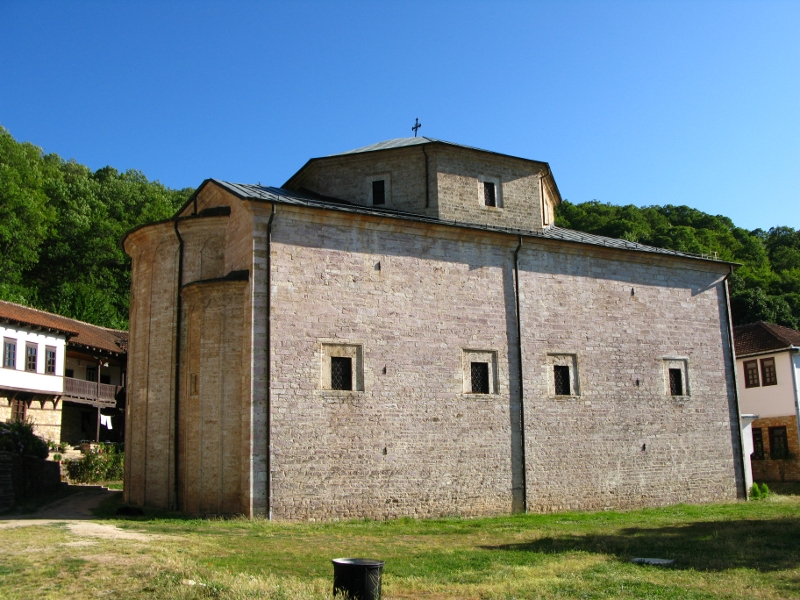
Monastery of Saint Bogorodica Prečista near Kicevo

The Monastery of St. Bogorodica Prečista (Immaculate Mother of God) (Macedonian: Света Богородица Пречиста, Sveta Bogorodica Prečista) is a Macedonian Orthodox monastery situated near the city of Kičevo, North Macedonia. It is dedicated to the Virgin Mary, Mother of God.

In 1924 Dositej, later the first Archbishop of the Macedonian Orthodox Church, became a monk in this monastery. The monastery is also famous for the legend of the 'flying icon' that was moved three times to another monastery and, allegedly, miraculously returned by itself to the original place, guided by a ray of light. The feast of the monastery is Mala Bogorodica (birthday of Virgin Mary on September 21).

== Saints Evnuvios, Paisios and Averikios ==
Saints Evnuvios, Paisios and Averikios

Venerable Martyrs
- Died: 27 May 1558; Kičevo
- Venerated in: Eastern Orthodox Church
- Canonized: Ilinden, Kičevo Monastery by Archbishop of Ohrid and Macedonia Mr. Stephen
- Feast: 27 May; 2 August

Saints Evnuvios, Paisios and Averikios (Macedonian: Свети преподобномаченици Евнувиј, Пајсиј и Аверикиј) were Eastern Orthodox monks from the town of Kičevo, today in North Macedonia, who suffered martyrdom in the monastery while protecting the Orthodox faith from the Ottoman army. They are the first saints to be canonised by the newly-autocephalous Macedonian Orthodox Church; the canonisation took place in the monastery where they died on 2 August 2012.
