= Bazernik =

Bazernik Базерник
- Village
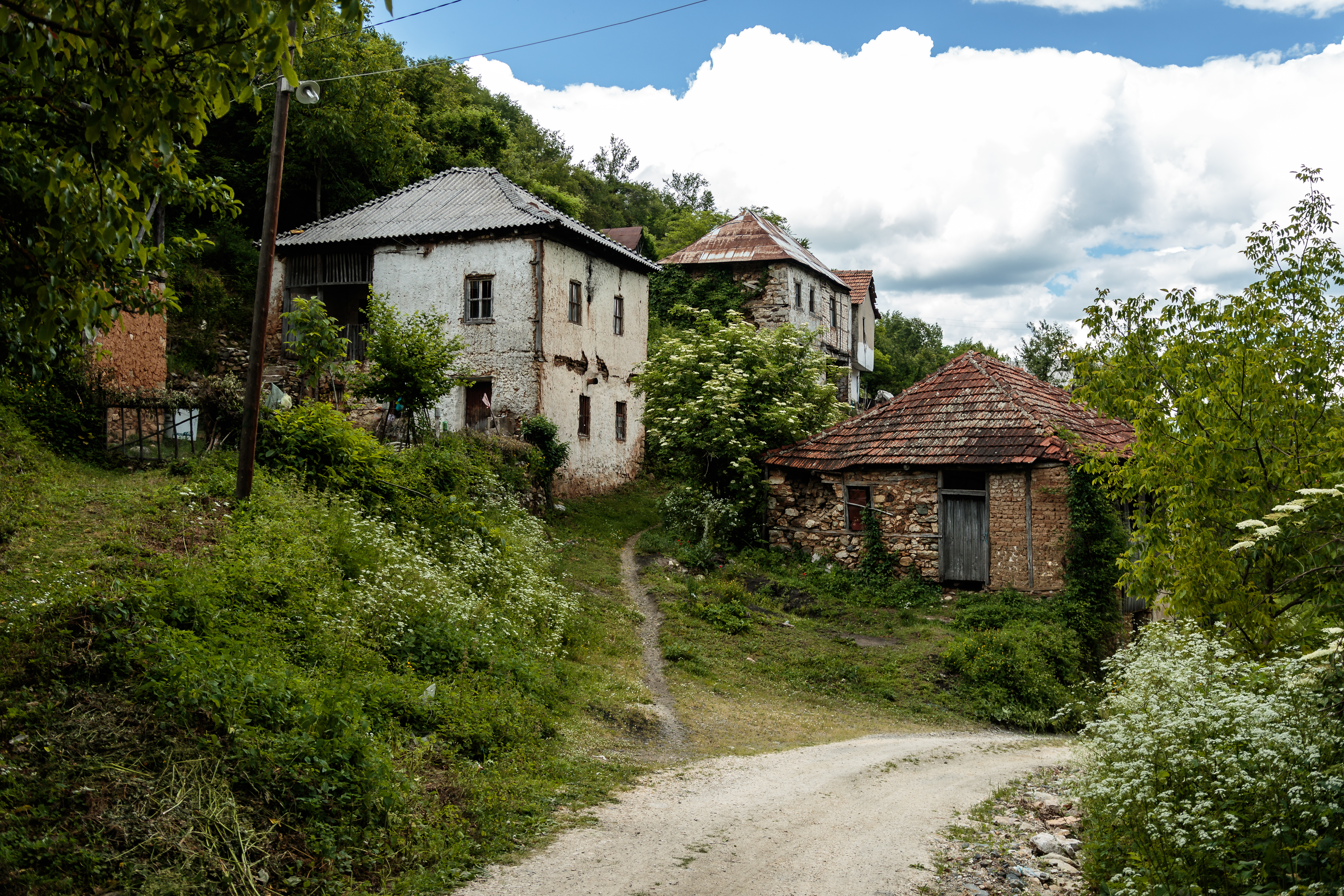

- Location within North Macedonia
- Country: North Macedonia
- Region: Pelagonia
- Municipality: Demir Hisar

Population (2002)
  - Total: 67
- Time zone: UTC+1 (CET)
  - Summer (DST): UTC+2 (CEST)
- Website: .

Bazernik (Macedonian Cyrillic: Базерник) is a village in the municipality of Demir Hisar, North Macedonia.

== Demographics ==
In the 1467/1468 defter the village had 28 households, 1 bachelor and 1 widow. The household heads almost entirely bore Slavic names, while a small minority Albanian.

In statistics gathered by Vasil Kanchov in 1900, the village of Bazernik was inhabited by 350 Christian Bulgarians.

According to the 2002 census, the village had a total of 67 inhabitants. Ethnic groups in the village include:

- Macedonians 52
