= Virovo, Demir Hisar =

Virovo Вирово
- Village
- Location within North Macedonia
- Coordinates: 41.233259°N 21.090021°E
- Country: North Macedonia
- Region: Pelagonia
- Municipality: Demir Hisar

Population (2002)
  - Total: 151
- Time zone: UTC+1 (CET)
  - Summer (DST): UTC+2 (CEST)
- Website: .

Virovo (Macedonian: Вирово) is a village in the municipality of Demir Hisar, North Macedonia. It used to be part of the former municipality of Sopotnica.

== Demographics ==
Virovo is attested in the Ottoman defter of 1467/68 as a village in the vilayet of Manastir. The village had 42 households 6 widows and 2 bachelors. The majority of the inhabitants attested bore typical Christian Slavic anthroponyms, while over a quarter of them bore Albanian or mixed Slavic-Albanian anthroponyms.

In statistics gathered by Vasil Kanchov in 1900, the village of Belče was inhabited by 350 Christian Bulgarians.

According to the 2002 census, the village had a total of 151 inhabitants, all of whom were ethnic Macedonians.
