= Demir Hisar (region) =

Region in North Macedonia

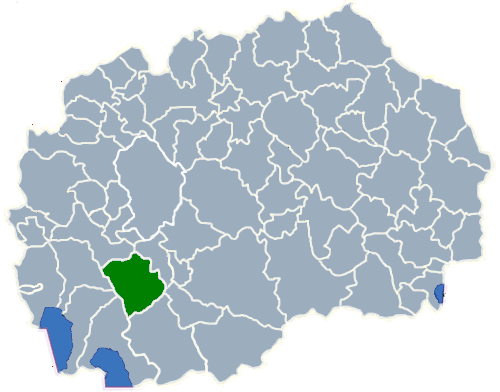
Demir Hisar (region).

Demir Hisar (Macedonian: Демир Хисар), also known as Železnik (Железник), is an area of North Macedonia.
