= Sopotnica, Demir Hisar =

Sopotnica Сoпoτница
- Village
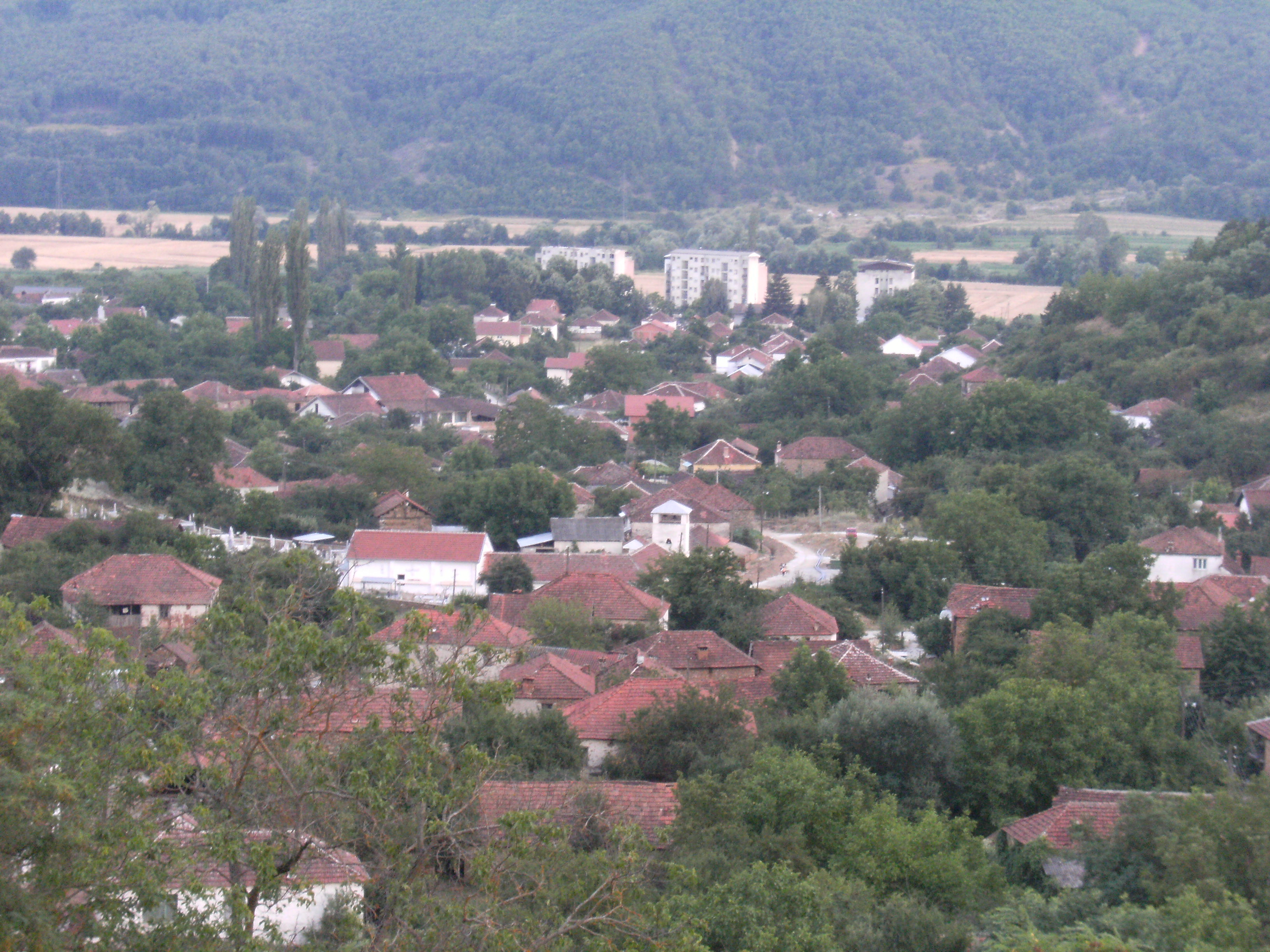
- Panorama of Sopotnica

- Flag Coat of Arms

- Location within North Macedonia
- Coordinates: 41°17′40″N 21°9′18″E
- Country: North Macedonia
- Region: Pelagonia
- Municipality: Demir Hisar

Government
  - Mayor: Ljupčo Najdovski

Area
  - Total: 48,013 km^{2} (18,538 sq mi)
- Highest elevation: 400 m (1,300 ft)
- Lowest elevation: 2,000 m (6,600 ft)

Population (2002)
  - Total: 929
  - Density: 19,780/km^{2} (51,200/sq mi)
- Time zone: UTC+1 (CET)
  - Summer (DST): UTC+2 (CEST)
- Postal code: 2304
- Area code: +389 047
- Car plates: DH
- Website: www.sopotnica.gov.mk/

Sopotnica (Macedonian: Сoпoτница) is a village in North Macedonia. It used to be a separate municipality but is now part of the Demir Hisar Municipality.

The area of Sopotnica includes a mix of rural and urban environments. Settled areas range from smaller villages such as Boište, Cerovo and Virovo, located in the mountainous area of Sopotnica, to places with elements of urban living, such as Sopotnica, the administrative centre of the former Municipality of Sopotnica. A key characteristic of the area is the contrast between the wild landscapes and the man-made features of cultivated areas.

The area of Sopotnica is rich in natural resources, and has significant cultural and historical heritage.

== Demography ==
=== Demographic history ===
According to Vasil Kanchov's study of Macedonia in 1900, "Macedonia, Ethnography and Statistics", (Bulgarian: Македония. Етнография и статистика, romanized: Makedoniya. Etnografiya i statistika), counted the village as having 560 inhabitants, all of whom were counted as Bulgarian Christians.

Dimitar Mišev's 1905 study of the Bulgarian Exarchate, Macedonia and its Christian population (French: La Macédoine et sa Population Chrétienne), counted 640 exarchists in the village.

Demographics of Sopotnica
Census year	Population
1961	956
1994	989
2002	929

=== Demographics today ===
According to the 2002 census, the village had a total of 929 inhabitants. Ethnic groups in the village include:

- Macedonians 926
- Serbs 3

The majority of the population was elderly and the proportion of young people was below the national average.

== Notable people ==
- Radovan Cvetkovski, (1931 – ) – author and writer
