= Demir Hisar Municipality =

Municipality of North Macedonia

Coordinates: 41.22391°N 21.20397°E

Municipality of Demir Hisar Општина Демир Хисар
- Municipality
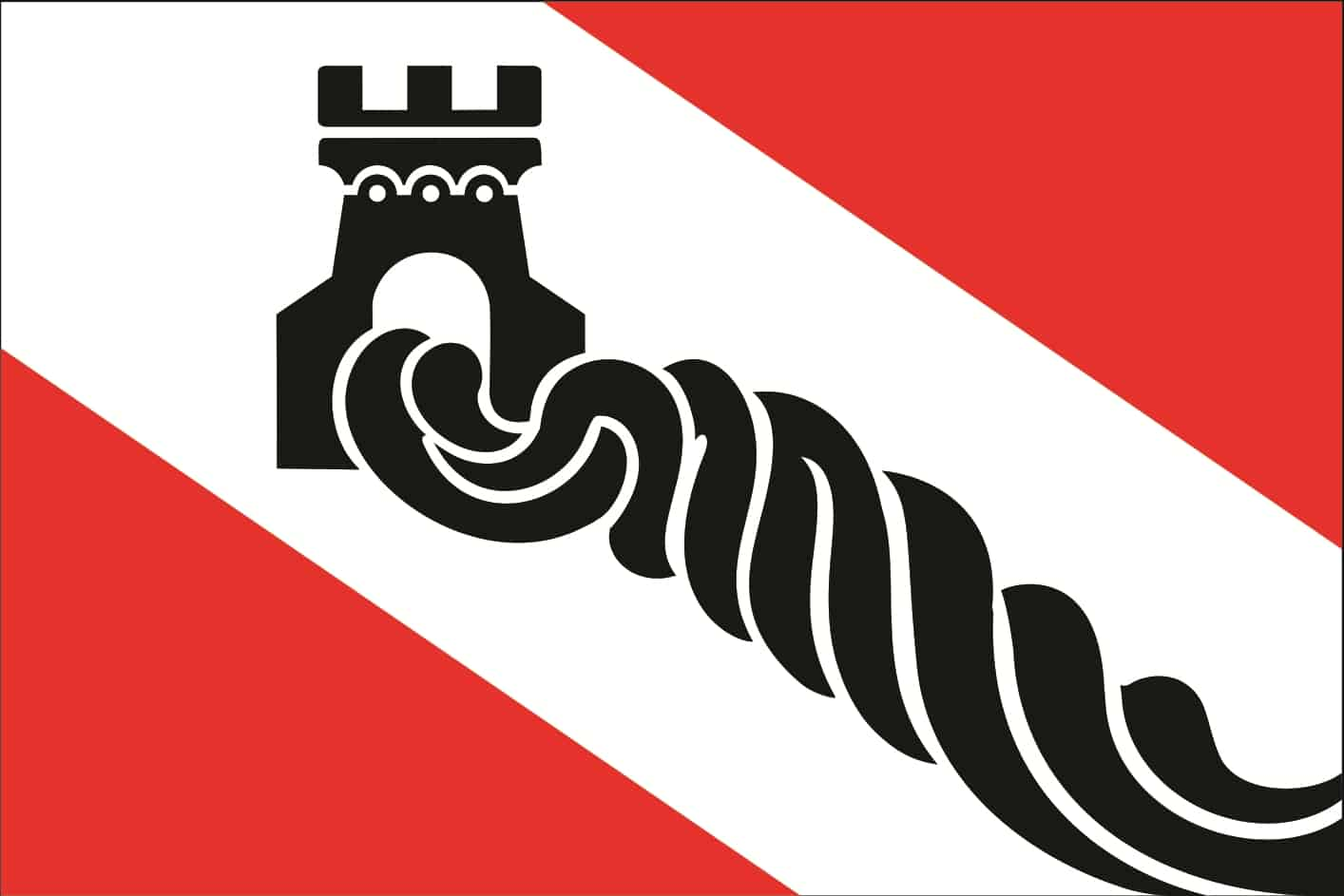
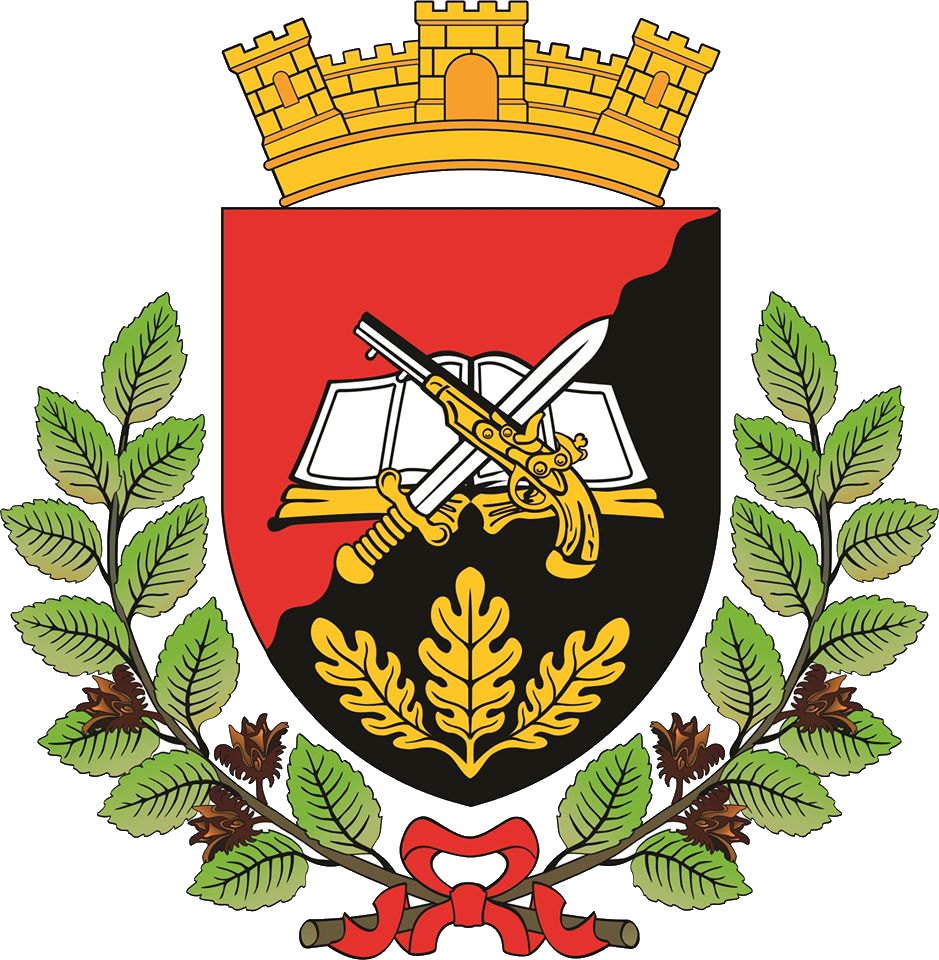
- Flag Coat of arms

- Country: North Macedonia
- Region: Pelagonia
- Municipal seat: Demir Hisar

Government
  - Mayor: Nikola Najdovski (VMRO-DPMNE)

Area
  - Total: 480.13 km^{2} (185.38 sq mi)

Population
  - Total: 7,260
  - Density: 15.1/km^{2} (39.2/sq mi)
- Time zone: UTC+1 (CET)
- Area code: 47
- Vehicle registration: DH

Demir Hisar (Macedonian: Демир Хисар [dɛˈmir‿xisar]) is a municipality in the southwestern part of North Macedonia. Demir Hisar, which means "iron fortress" in Turkish, is also the name of the town where the municipal seat is located. The Demir Hisar Municipality is part of the Pelagonia Statistical Region.

== Geography ==
The municipality borders the Kičevo Municipality to the north, the Kruševo and Mogila Municipalities to the east, the Bitola Municipality to the south, and the Resen, Ohrid, and Debarca Municipalities to the west.

== Demographics ==
According to the 2021 North Macedonia census, this municipality has 7,260 inhabitants. Ethnic groups in the municipality include:

	2002		2021	
	Number	%	Number	%
TOTAL	9,497	100	7,260	100
Macedonians	9,179	96.65	6,708	92.4
Albanians	232	2.44	218	3
Roma	11	0.12	16	0.22
Vlachs	7	0.07	10	0.14
Serbs	13	0.14	6	0.08
Turks	35	0.37	4	0.06
Bosniaks	2	0.02		
Other / Undeclared / Unknown	18	0.19	29	0.39
Persons for whom data are taken from administrative sources			269	3.71
