= Evla, Centar Župa =

Evla Евла Avla
- Village
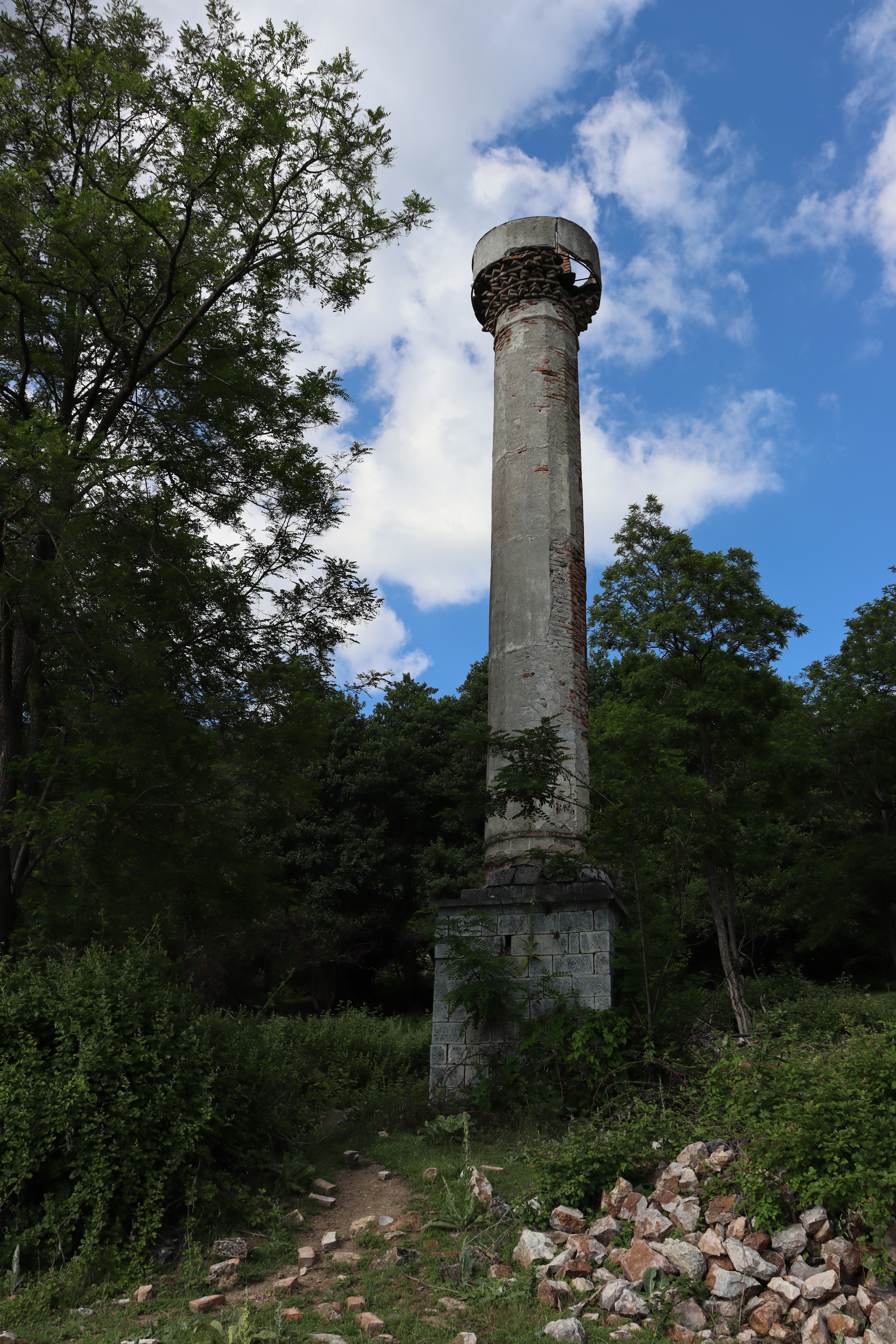
- Ruins of the former mosque in the village Evla

- Location within North Macedonia
- Coordinates: 41°25′15″N 20°37′23″E
- Country: North Macedonia
- Region: Southwestern
- Municipality: Centar Župa

Population (2002)
  - Total: 0
- Time zone: UTC+1 (CET)
  - Summer (DST): UTC+2 (CEST)
- Car plates: DB
- Website: .

Evla, also Dolno Elevci (Macedonian: Евла, Albanian: Avla) is an abandoned village in the municipality of Centar Župa, North Macedonia.

== Demographics ==
According to Ottoman tahrir defters from the 1520s, 16 villages (all present-day Centar Župa villages) associated with Kala-i Kodžadžik had no Muslim population. However, the Muslim population increased in subsequent years. This was likely part of the Islamization of Macedonia under Turkish rule.

In the 1901 Ethnographic Map of the Bitola Vilayet, produced by the Sofia Cartography Institute, Dolno Elevci part of the Sanjak of Dibra—is depicted as a village of 37 households with a mixed population of Bulgarians, Pomaks, Albanians, and Turks.

According to the statistics of Jovan Hadži-Vasiljević "Muslims of Our Blood in Southern Serbia" (Muslimani naše krvi u Južnoj Srbiji. Beograd 1924) from 1924, the Muslim inhabitants of the villages of Gorno Elevci and Dolno Elevci were Torbeši linguistically and culturally Turkified.

According to the 1942 Albanian census, Evla was inhabited by 42 Muslim Albanians.

The settlement last had inhabitants in the 1961 census, where it was recorded as being populated by 2 Albanians.

According to the 2002 census, the village had a total of 0 inhabitants.
