= Odžovci =

- Village
- Оџовци; Hoxhaj
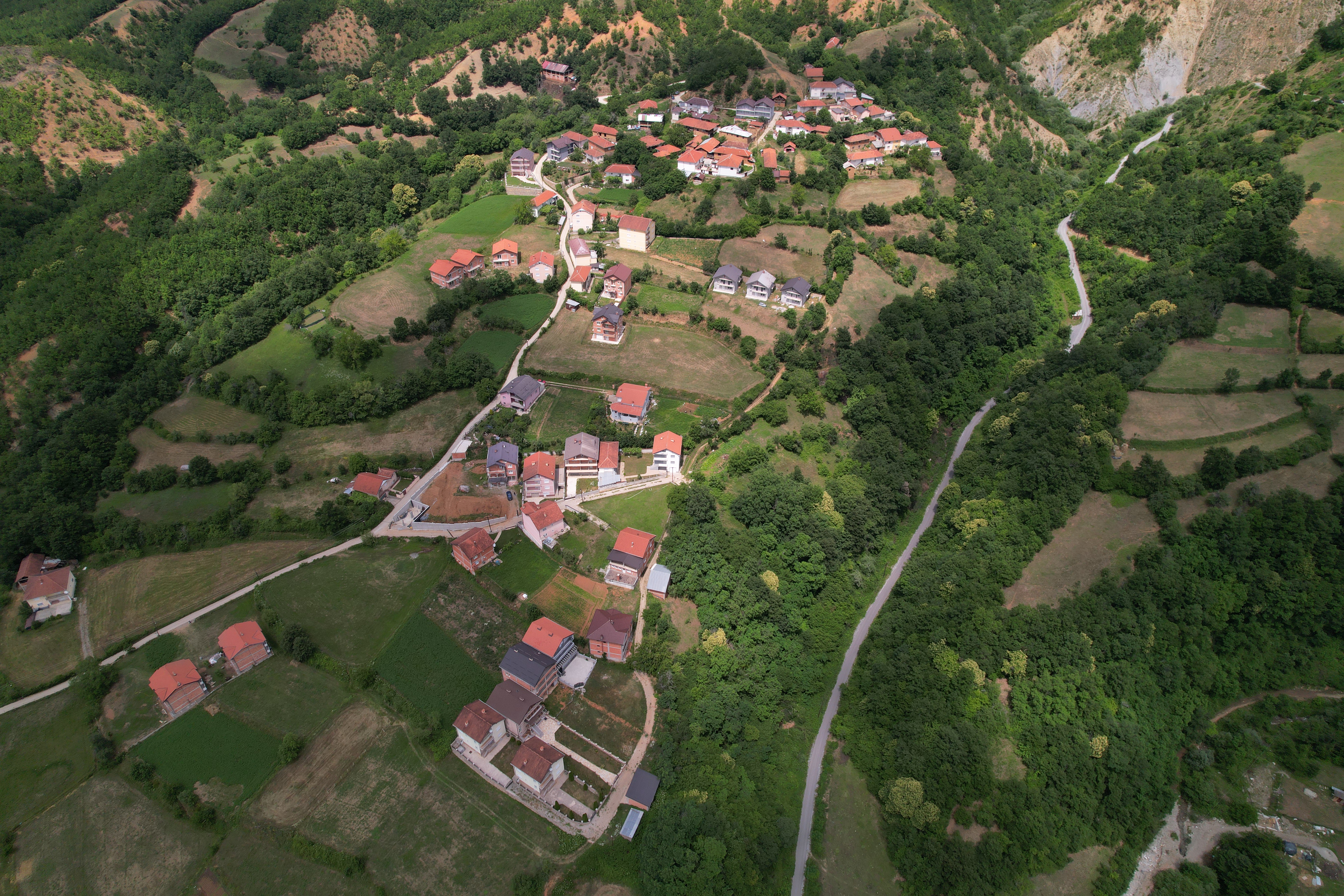
- Airview of the village

- Location within North Macedonia
- Coordinates: 41°29′N 20°34′E
- Country: North Macedonia
- Region: Southwestern
- Municipality: Centar Župa

Population (2021)
  - Total: 94
- Time zone: UTC+1 (CET)
  - Summer (DST): UTC+2 (CEST)
- Car plates: DB
- Website: .

Odžovci (Macedonian: Оџовци, Albanian: Hoxhaj; Turkish: Ocovtsa) is a village in the municipality of Centar Župa, North Macedonia. Odžovci was once a former neighbourhood of the village of Balanci and in 1965 elevated to the status of an independent village. The population density of the village is 6.4 km2.

== Name ==
The toponym Odžovci is a patronymic formation derived from the term odža (meaning teacher, via Turkish from Persian) and the suffix ovci.

== Demographics ==
According to Ottoman tahrir defters from the 1520s, 16 villages (all present-day Centar Župa villages) associated with Kala-i Kodžadžik had no Muslim population. However, the Muslim population increased in subsequent years. This was likely part of the Islamization of Macedonia under Turkish rule.

As of the 2021 census, Odžovci had 94 residents with the following ethnic composition:

- Turks 64
- Persons for whom data are taken from administrative sources 18
- Albanians 10
- Macedonians 2

According to the 2002 census, the village had a total of 220 inhabitants. Ethnic groups in the village include:

- Turks 203
- Albanians 17
