= Broštica =

- Village
- Броштица; Broshticë
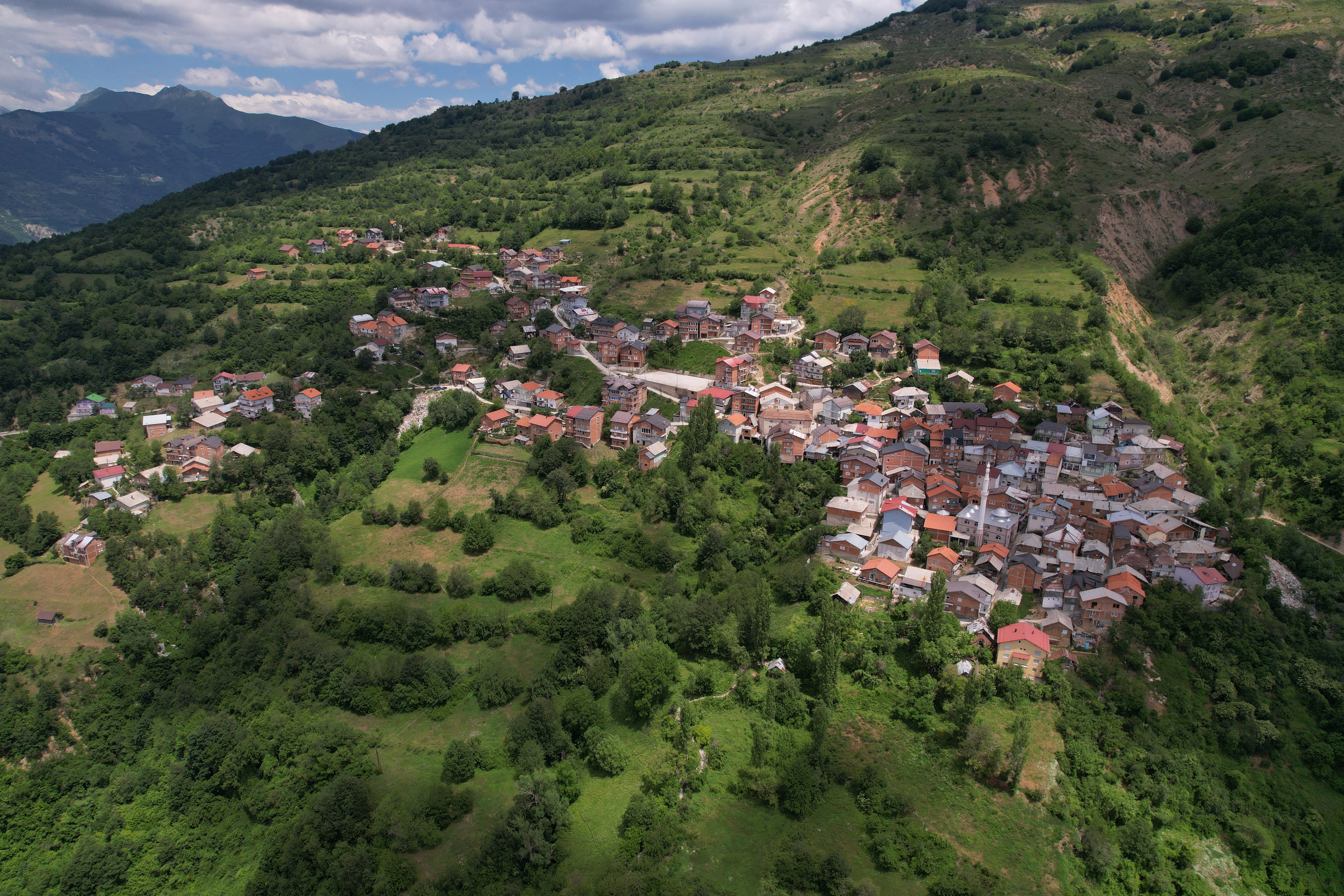
- Airview of the village

- Location within North Macedonia
- Coordinates: 41°29′30″N 20°35′04″E
- Country: North Macedonia
- Region: Southwestern
- Municipality: Centar Župa

Population (2002)
  - Total: 748
- Time zone: UTC+1 (CET)
  - Summer (DST): UTC+2 (CEST)
- Car plates: DB

Broštica (Macedonian: Броштица, Albanian: Broshticë) is a village in the municipality of Centar Župa, North Macedonia.

== Demographics ==
According to Ottoman tahrir defters from the 1520s, 16 villages (all present-day Centar Župa villages) associated with Kala-i Kodžadžik had no Muslim population. However, the Muslim population increased in subsequent years. This was likely part of the Islamization of Macedonia under Turkish rule.

In the 1901 Ethnographic Map of the Bitola Vilayet, produced by the Sofia Cartography Institute, Broštica part of the Sanjak of Dibra—is depicted as a village of 116 households with a mixed population of Bulgarians, Pomaks, Albanians, and Turks.

Broštica has traditionally been inhabited by an Orthodox Macedonian and Torbeš population. A few Albanians live in the village alongside the Torbeš population of Broštica.

According to the 2002 census, the village had a total of 748 inhabitants. Ethnic groups in the village include:

- Macedonians 622
- Turks 124
