= Gorenci, Centar Župa =

Gorenci
- Village
- Горенци
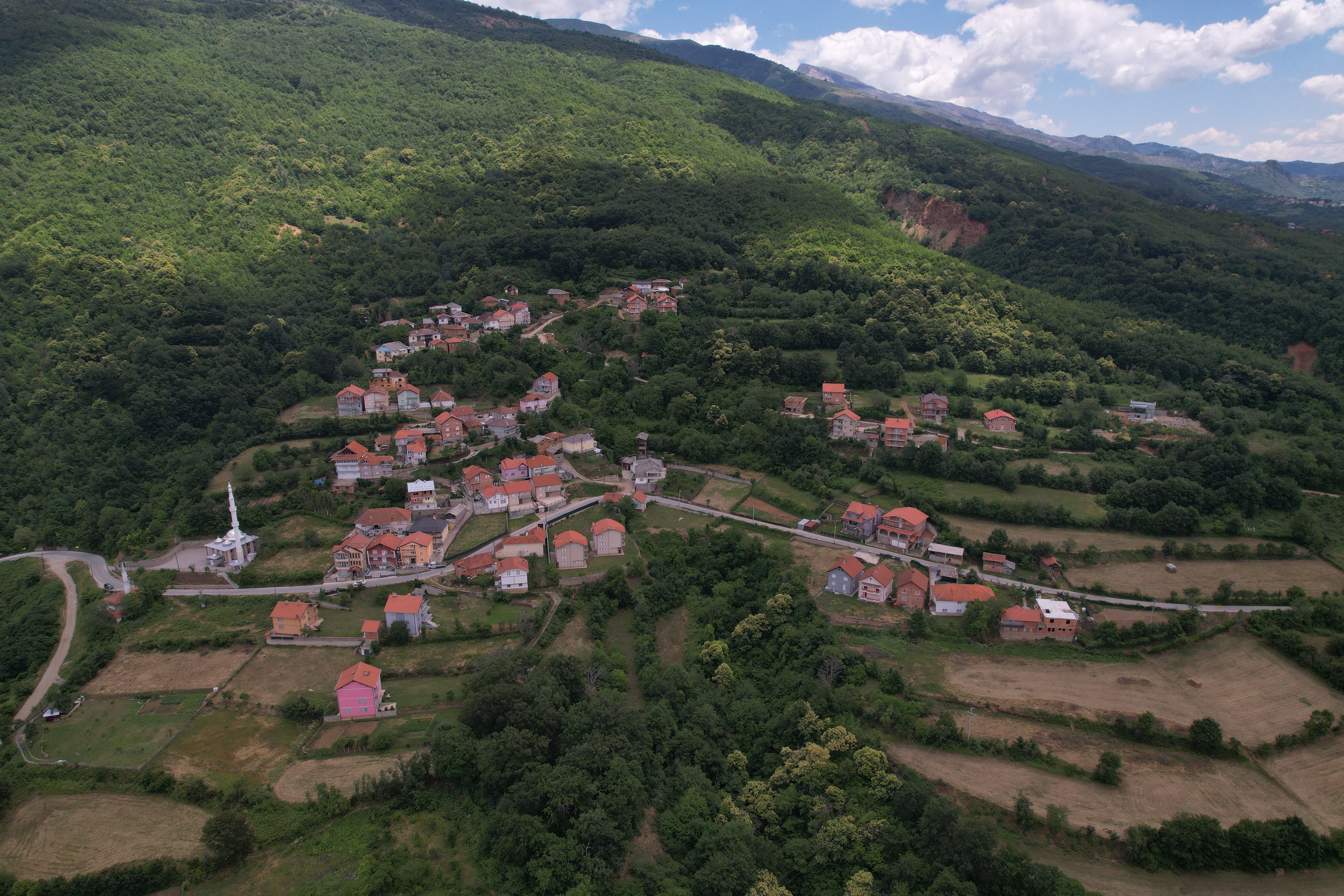
- Airview of the village

- Location within North Macedonia
- Coordinates: 41°30′03″N 20°33′24″E
- Country: North Macedonia
- Region: Southwestern
- Municipality: Centar Župa

Population (2002)
  - Total: 267
- Time zone: UTC+1 (CET)
  - Summer (DST): UTC+2 (CEST)
- Car plates: DB

Gorenci (Macedonian: Горенци) is a village in the municipality of Centar Župa, North Macedonia.

== Demographics ==
Gorenci(Guranxhi) is recorded in the Ottoman defter of 1467 as a village in the vilayet of Upper Dibra, part of the timar Borizan Sulejman. The settlement had a total of 2 households with the anthroponymy attested being of a mixed Albanian-Slavic character.

According to Ottoman tahrir defters from the 1520s, 16 villages (all present-day Centar Župa villages) associated with Kala-i Kodžadžik had no Muslim population. However, the Muslim population increased in subsequent years. This was likely part of the Islamization of Macedonia under Turkish rule.

In the 1901 Ethnographic Map of the Bitola Vilayet, produced by the Sofia Cartography Institute, Gorenci part of the Sanjak of Dibra—is depicted as a village of 85 households with a mixed population of Bulgarians, Pomaks, Albanians, and Turks.

According to the 2002 census, the village had a total of 267 inhabitants. Ethnic groups in the village include:

- Turks 221
- Macedonians 37
- Albanians 9
