= Kočišta =

- Village
- Кочишта
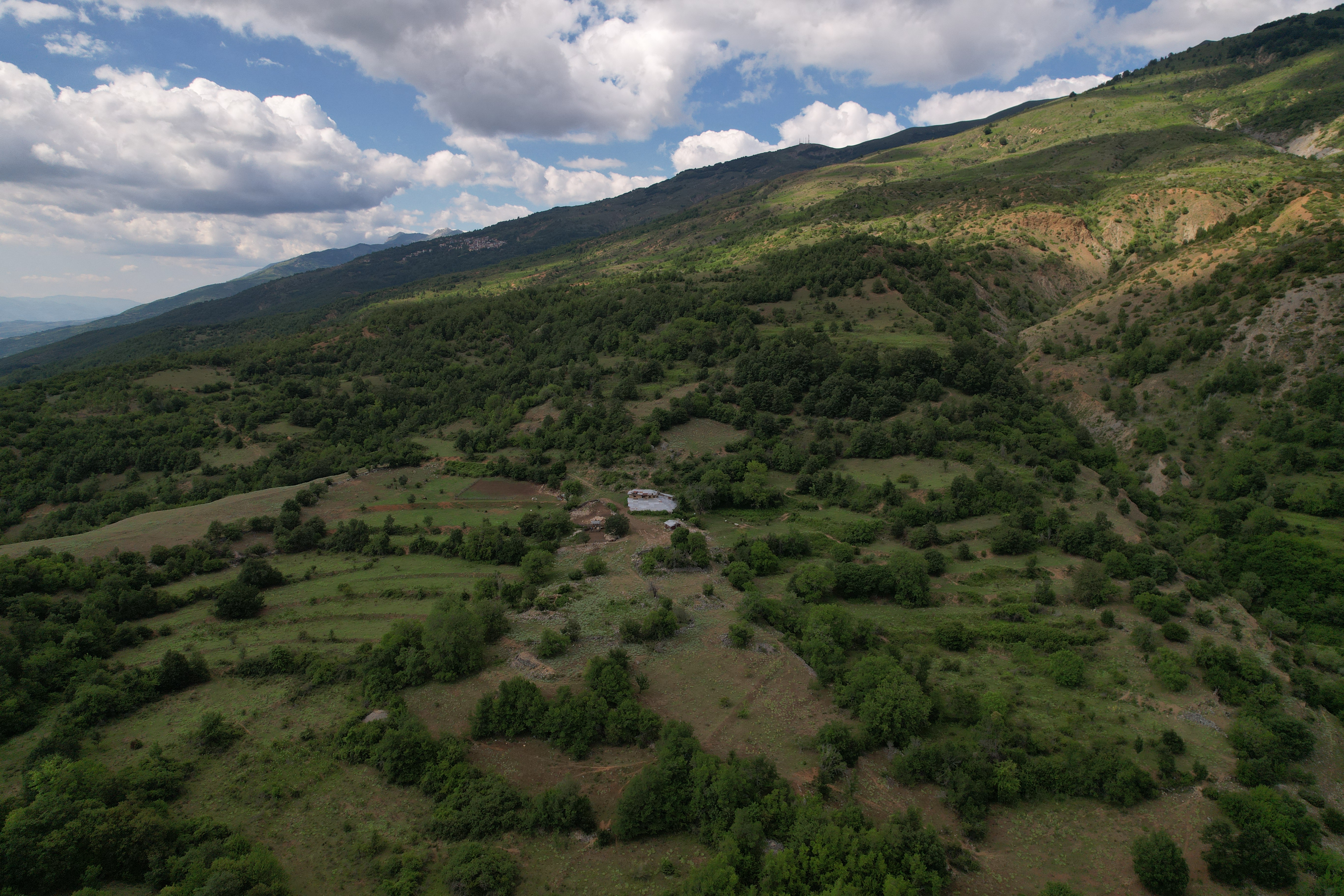
- Airview of the village

- Location within North Macedonia
- Coordinates: 41°27′46″N 20°35′29″E
- Country: North Macedonia
- Region: Southwestern
- Municipality: Centar Župa

Population (2002)
  - Total: 0
- Time zone: UTC+1 (CET)
  - Summer (DST): UTC+2 (CEST)
- Car plates: DB

Kočišta (Macedonian: Кочишта) is an abandoned village in the municipality of Centar Župa, North Macedonia.

== Demographics ==
Kočišta (Коçishtë) is recorded in the Ottoman defter of 1467 as a village in the vilayet of Upper Dibra, part of the timar of Muhidin. The settlement was recorded as abandoned.

According to Ottoman tahrir defters from the 1520s, 16 villages (all present-day Centar Župa villages) associated with Kala-i Kodžadžik had no Muslim population. However, the Muslim population increased in subsequent years. This was likely part of the Islamization of Macedonia under Turkish rule. According to Vasil Kanchov's statistics in his book Macedonia: Ethnography and Statistics, 180 Bulgarian Christians and 175 Bulgarian Muslims lived in Kočišta in 1900. In the 1901 Ethnographic Map of the Bitola Vilayet, produced by the Sofia Cartography Institute, Kočišta part of the Sanjak of Dibra—is depicted as a village of 60 households with a mixed population of Bulgarians, Pomaks, Albanians, and Turks.

The village when inhabited in past times had a Torbeš population.

According to the 2002 census, the village had a total of 0 inhabitants.
