= Vlasiḱi =

Vlasiḱi Власиќи Vllasiq
- Village
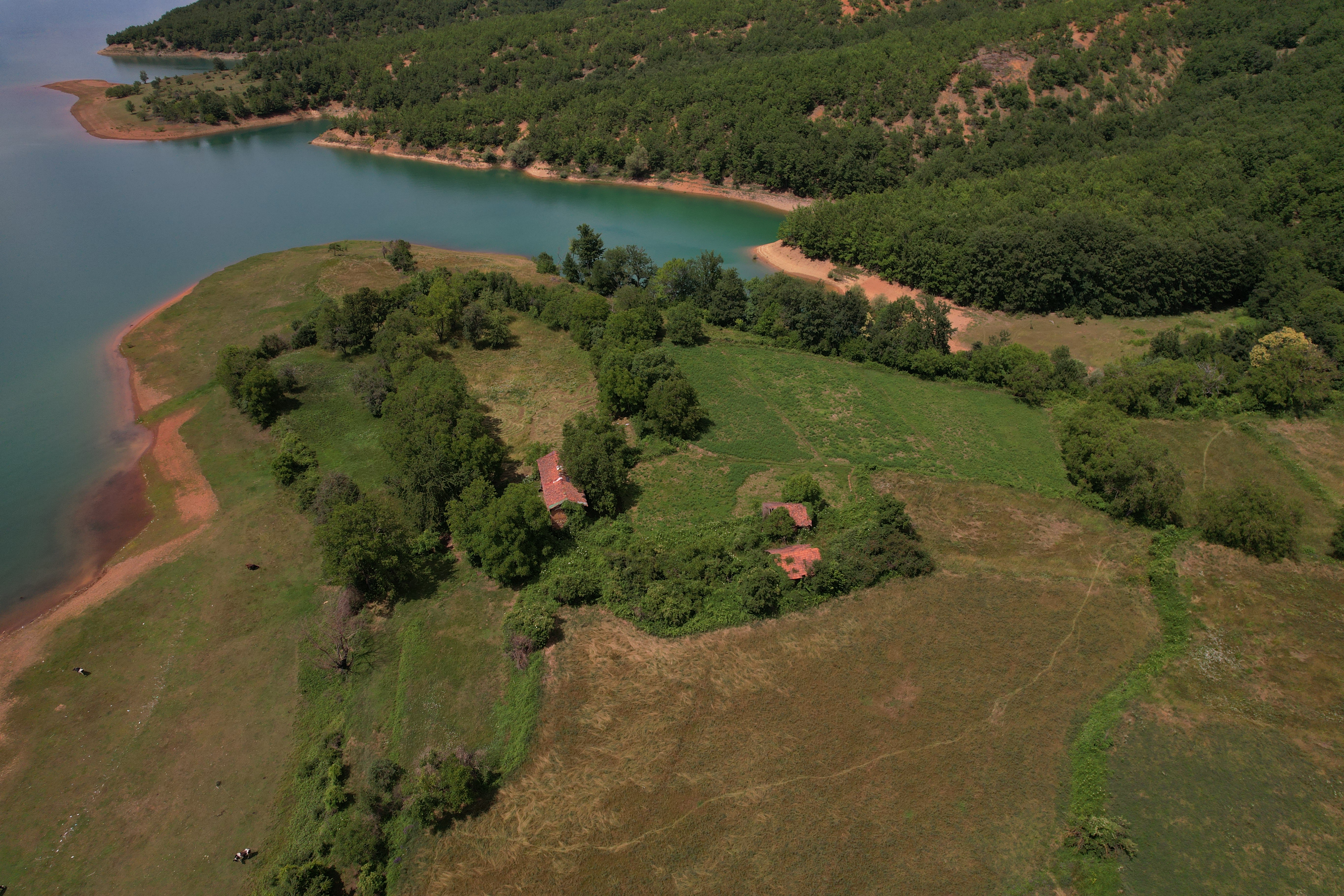
- Airview of the village

- Location within North Macedonia
- Coordinates: 41°28′36″N 20°31′30″E
- Country: North Macedonia
- Region: Southwestern
- Municipality: Centar Župa

Population (2002)
  - Total: 0
- Time zone: UTC+1 (CET)
  - Summer (DST): UTC+2 (CEST)
- Car plates: DB
- Website: .

Vlasiḱi (Macedonian: Власиќи, Albanian: Vllasiq) is an abandoned village in the municipality of Centar Župa, North Macedonia. The settlement of Vlasiḱi was once a neighborhood of the nearby village of Balanci.

== Demographics ==
Vlasiḱi (Ilasiçe) is recorded in the Ottoman defter of 1467 as a village in the vilayet of Upper Dibra, part of the timar of Karagjoz. The settlement was attested as being uninhabited.

According to Ottoman tahrir defters from the 1520s, 16 villages (all present-day Centar Župa villages) associated with Kala-i Kodžadžik had no Muslim population. However, the Muslim population increased in subsequent years. This was likely part of the Islamization of Macedonia under Turkish rule.

In the late Ottoman period, Vlasiḱi was traditionally inhabited by an Orthodox Macedonian and Muslim Macedonian (Torbeš) population. In the twentieth century, the village when inhabited had Albanians living in Vlasiḱi.

According to the 2002 census, the village had a total of 0 inhabitants.
