= Žitineni =

- Village
- Житинени; Zhitinen
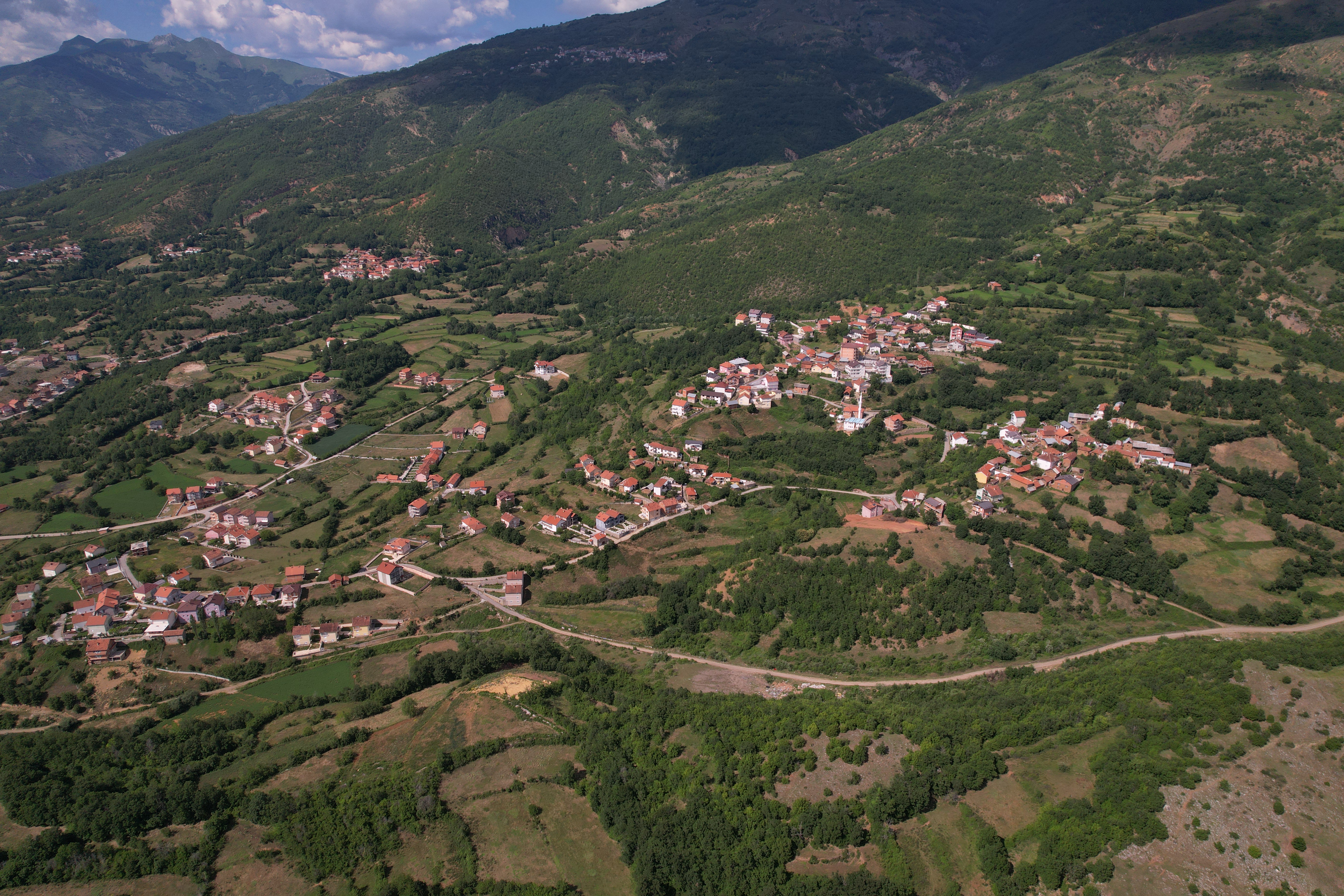
- Airview of the village

- Location within North Macedonia
- Coordinates: 41°28′N 20°34′E
- Country: North Macedonia
- Region: Southwestern
- Municipality: Centar Župa

Population (2021)
  - Total: 258
- Time zone: UTC+1 (CET)
  - Summer (DST): UTC+2 (CEST)
- Car plates: DB
- Website: .

Žitineni (Macedonian: Житинени, Albanian: Zhitinen; Turkish: Jitnenik) is a village in the municipality of Centar Župa, North Macedonia.

== Demographics ==
Žitineni (Zhitinen) is recorded in the Ottoman defter of 1467 as a village in the vilayet of Upper Dibra, part of the timar of Kara Ahmed. The settlement was recorded as abandoned.

According to Ottoman tahrir defters from the 1520s, 16 villages (all present-day Centar Župa villages) associated with Kala-i Kodžadžik had no Muslim population. However, the Muslim population increased in subsequent years. This was likely part of the Islamization of Macedonia under Turkish rule.

Žitineni has traditionally been inhabited by Orthodox Macedonian and a Turks (Torbeši) population. A few Albanians live in the village alongside the Turks (Torbeši) Muslim population in Žitineni.

As of the 2021 census, Žitineni had 258 residents with the following ethnic composition:

- Turks 224
- Persons for whom data are taken from administrative sources 33
- Albanians 1

According to the 2002 census, the village had a total of 537 inhabitants. Ethnic groups in the village include:

- Turks 536
- Albanians 1
