= Golem Papradnik =

- Village
- Голем Папрадник
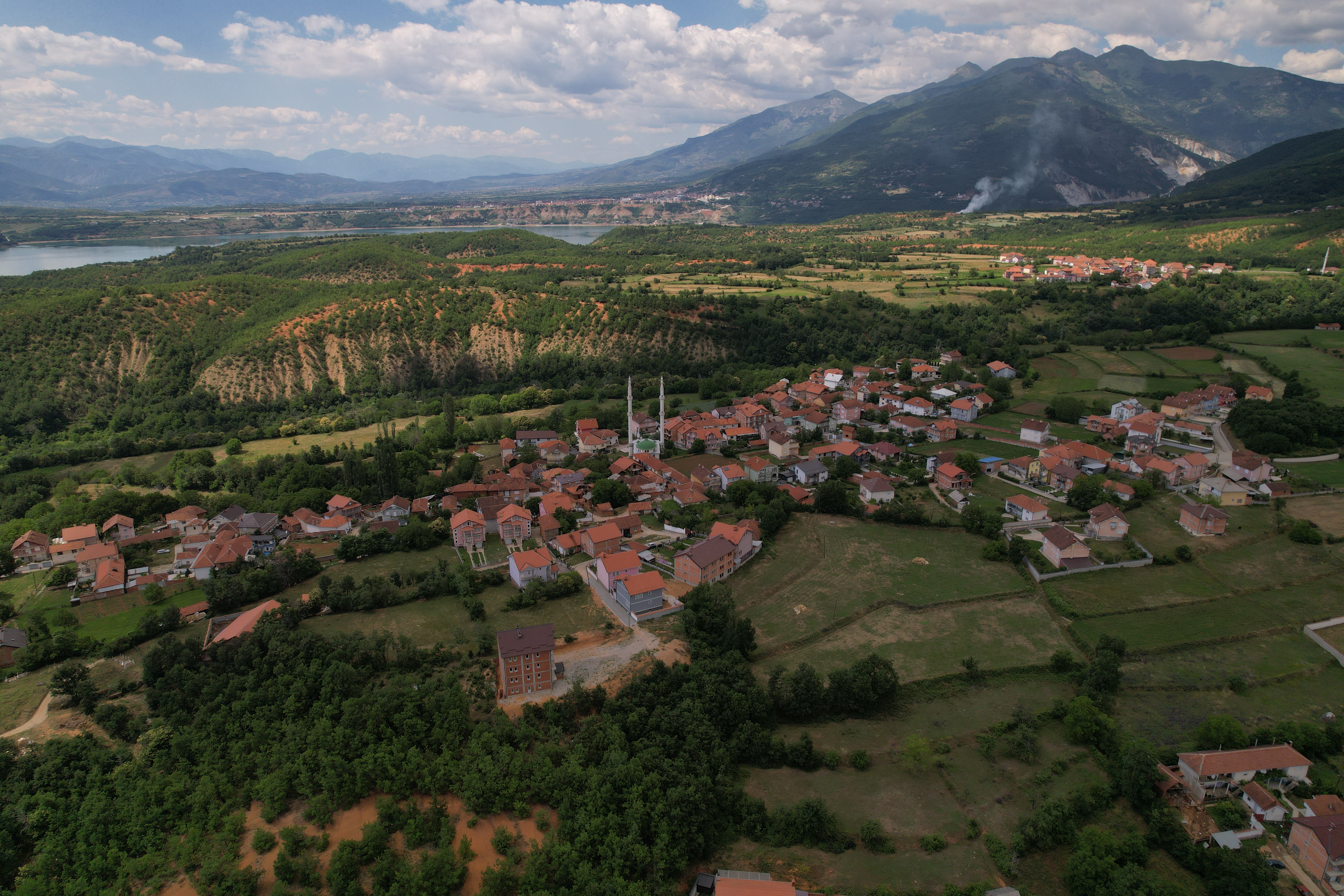
- Airview of the village

- Location within North Macedonia
- Coordinates: 41°29′N 20°33′E
- Country: North Macedonia
- Region: Southwestern
- Municipality: Centar Župa

Population (2021)
  - Total: 443
- Time zone: UTC+1 (CET)
  - Summer (DST): UTC+2 (CEST)
- Car plates: DB
- Website: .

Golem Papradnik (Macedonian: Голем Папрадник) is a village in the municipality of Centar Župa, North Macedonia.

== Demographics ==
Golem Papradnik (Papratnik) is recorded in the Ottoman defter of 1467 as a village in the vilayet of Upper Dibra. The settlement was abandoned.

According to Ottoman tahrir defters from the 1520s, 16 villages (all present-day Centar Župa villages) associated with Kala-i Kodžadžik had no Muslim population. However, the Muslim population increased in subsequent years. This was likely part of the Islamization of Macedonia under Turkish rule.

In the 1901 Ethnographic Map of the Bitola Vilayet, produced by the Sofia Cartography Institute, Golemo Papranci part of the Sanjak of Dibra—is depicted as a village of 126 households with a mixed population of Bulgarians, Pomaks, Albanians, and Turks.

As of the 2021 census, Golem Papradnik had 443 residents with the following ethnic composition:

- Turks 329
- Persons for whom data are taken from administrative sources 79
- Macedonians 22
- Albanians 11
- Others 2

According to the 2002 census, the village had a total of 840 inhabitants. Ethnic groups in the village include:

- Turks 799
- Macedonians 30
- Albanians 1
- Others 10
