= Crno Boci =

- Village
- Црно Боци
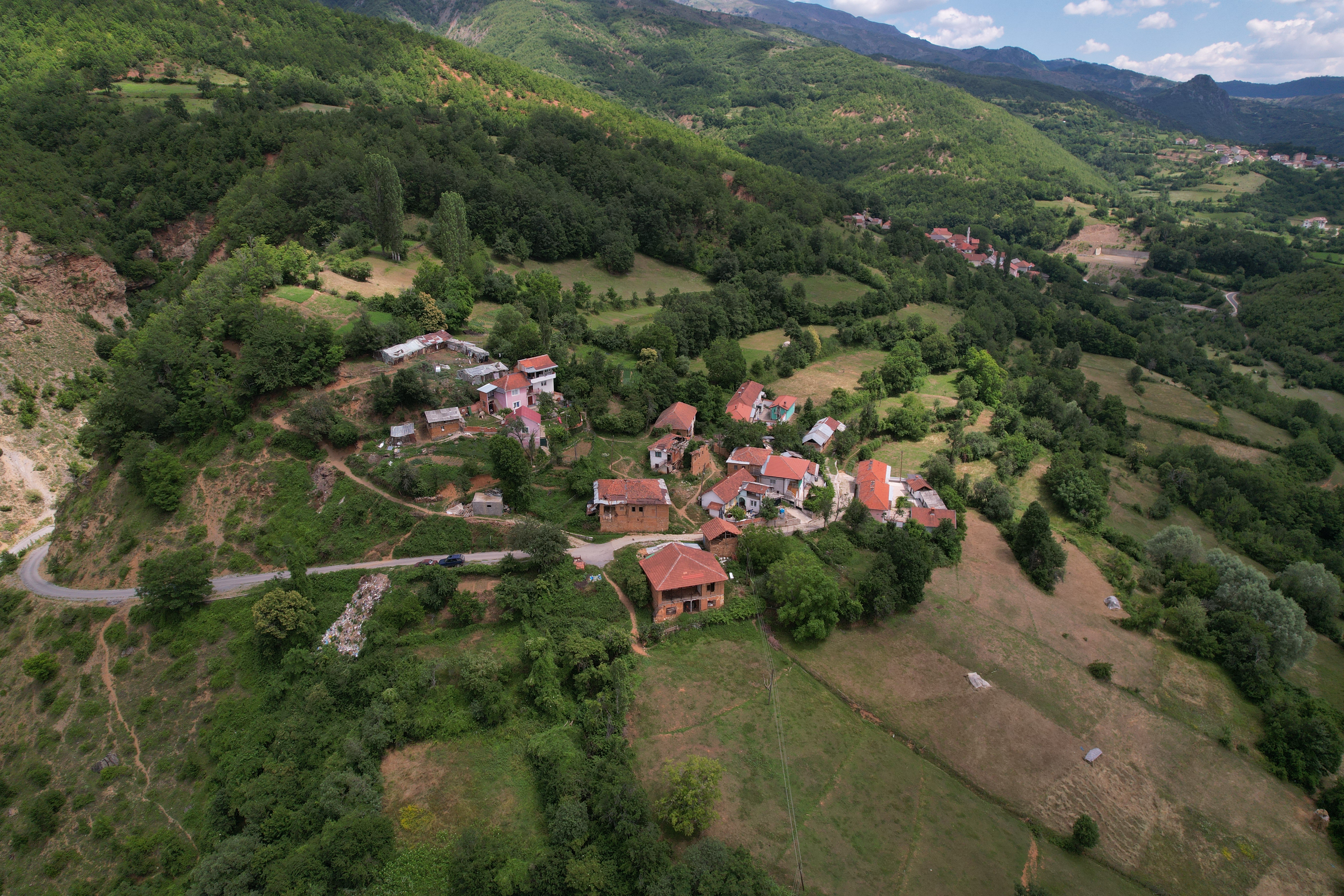
- Airview of the village

- Location within North Macedonia
- Coordinates: 41°29′03″N 20°34′02″E
- Country: North Macedonia
- Region: Southwestern
- Municipality: Centar Župa

Population (2021)
  - Total: 30
- Time zone: UTC+1 (CET)
  - Summer (DST): UTC+2 (CEST)
- Car plates: DB
- Website: .

Crno Boci (Macedonian: Црно Боци) is a village in the municipality of Centar Župa, North Macedonia. Crno Boci, a former neighbourhood of the village of Balanci was elevated in the 1960s to the status of an independent village. The population density of the village is 6.4 km2.

== Name ==
The toponym Crno Boci is derived from the name of a pagan Slavic deity Chernobog (Black God).

== Demographics ==
Crno Boci (Çernobok) is recorded in the Ottoman defter of 1467 as a village in the vilayet of Dulgobrda. The settlement was abandoned.

According to Ottoman tahrir defters from the 1520s, 16 villages (all present-day Centar Župa villages) associated with Kala-i Kodžadžik had no Muslim population. However, the Muslim population increased in subsequent years. This was likely part of the Islamization of Macedonia under Turkish rule.

Crno Boci has traditionally been inhabited by a Turks (Torbeši) population.

As of the 2021 census, Crno Boci had 30 residents with the following ethnic composition:

- Turks 30

According to the 2002 census, the village had a total of 40 inhabitants. Ethnic groups in the village include:

- Turks 40
