= Balanci =

Balanci Баланци Ballancë
- Village
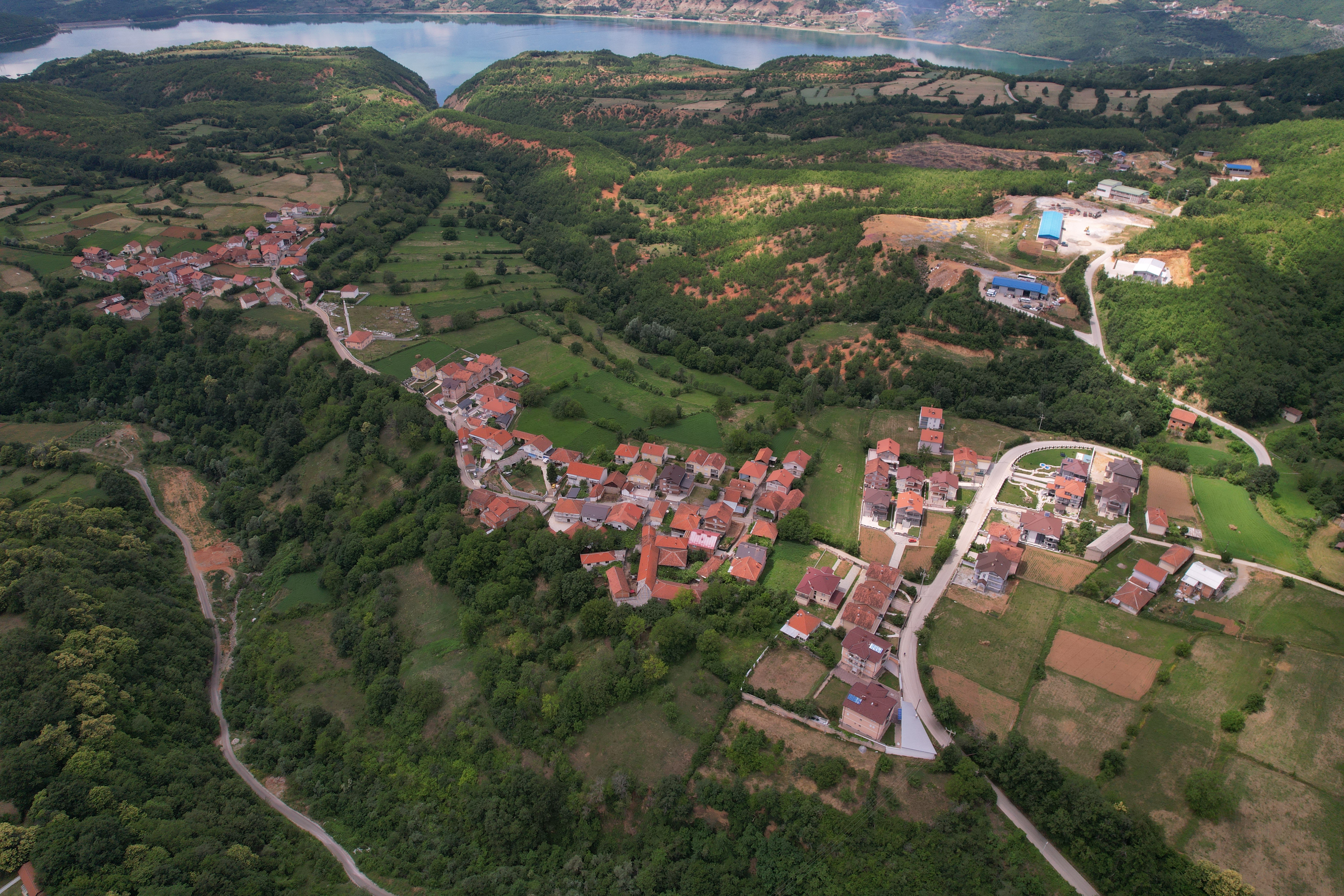
- Airview of the village Balanci

- Location within North Macedonia
- Coordinates: 41°29′N 20°33′E
- Country: North Macedonia
- Region: Southwestern
- Municipality: Centar Župa

Population (2021)
  - Total: 165
- Time zone: UTC+1 (CET)
  - Summer (DST): UTC+2 (CEST)
- Car plates: DB
- Website: .

Balanci (Macedonian: Баланци, Albanian: Ballancë) is a village in the municipality of Centar Župa, North Macedonia. The nearby village of Vlasiḱi was once a neighbourhood of Balanci. Other neighbouring villages of Bajramovci, Crno Boci and Odžovci were also once neighbourhoods of Balanci until the mid 1960s when they were elevated to the status of separate villages. This is the only village within the municipal boundaries where the majority of the population identifies as Albanian in modern censuses.

== Name ==
The toponym Balanci is a patronymic formation derived from the name Balan and the suffix (ov)ci.

== Demographics ==
Balanci (Ballani) is recorded in the Ottoman defter of 1467 as a village in the vilayet of Upper Dibra. The settlement was abandoned.

According to Ottoman tahrir defters from the 1520s, 16 villages (all present-day Centar Župa villages) associated with Kala-i Kodžadžik had no Muslim population. However, the Muslim population increased in subsequent years. This was likely part of the Islamization of Macedonia under Turkish rule.

In the 19th century, Balanci was a village in the Sanjak of Dibra within the Ottoman Empire. In the work titled *Ethnography of the Vilayets of Adrianople, Monastir, and Salonika*—published in Istanbul in 1878 and based on male population statistics from 1873—Balanci is listed as a village comprising 28 households and a population of 42 Pomaks and 35 Bulgarians.

In the 1901 ethnographic map of the Bitola Vilayet prepared by the Sofia Cartographic Institute, Balanca is depicted as a village comprising 60 households inhabited exclusively by Pomaks, situated within the Sanjak of Dibra.

According to the 1942 Albanian census, Balanci was inhabited by 352 Muslim Albanians.

As of the 2021 census, Balanci had 165 residents with the following ethnic composition:

- Albanians 149
- Persons for whom data are taken from administrative sources 12
- Turks 4

According to the 2002 census, the village had a total of 432 inhabitants. Ethnic groups in the village include:

- Albanians 422
- Macedonians 9
- Others 1

Some Macedonian Muslims live in the village alongside the Albanian population of Balanci.
