= Breštani =

Breštani Брештани Breştanik
- Village
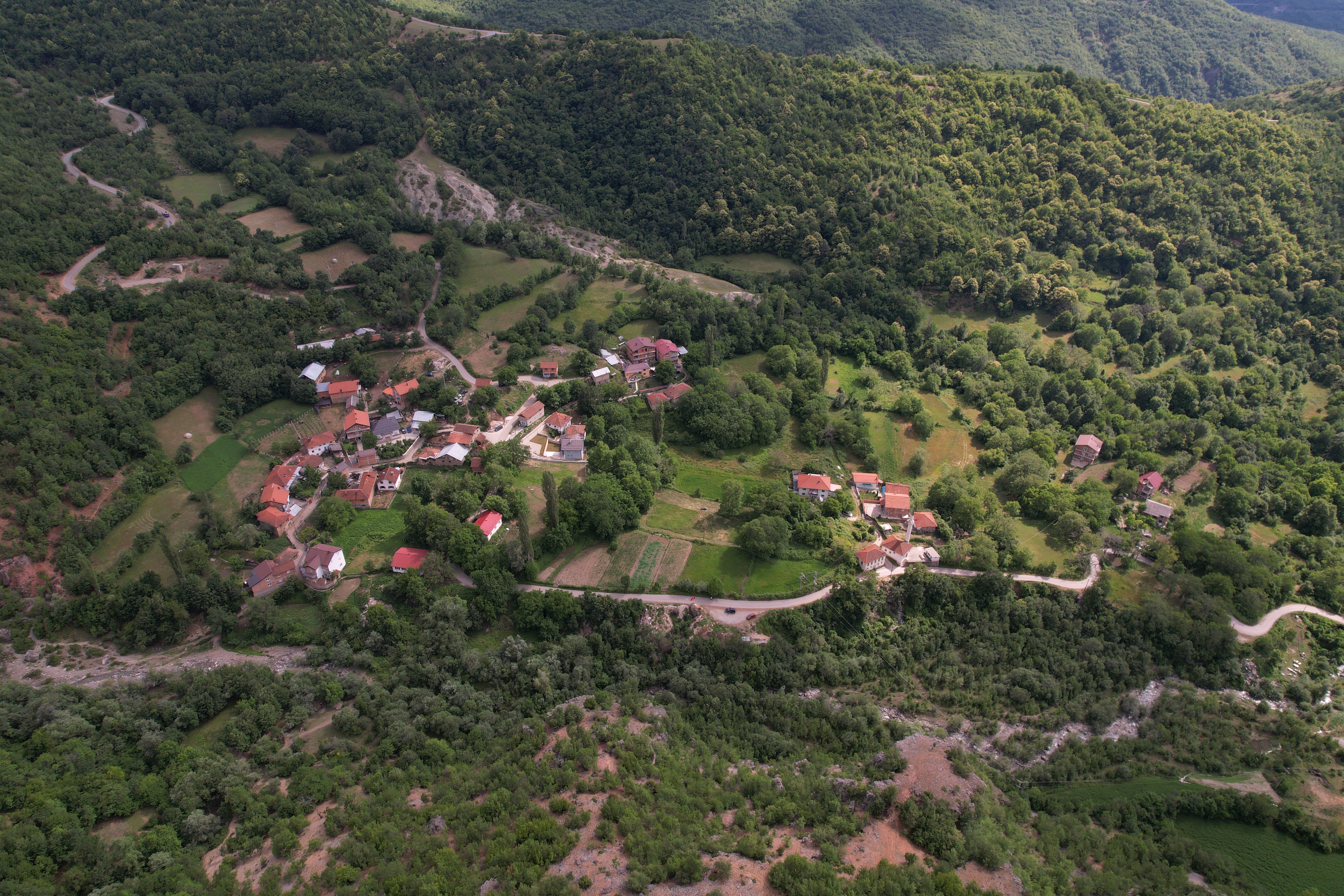
- Airview of the village

- Location within North Macedonia
- Coordinates: 41°27′15″N 20°35′09″E
- Country: North Macedonia
- Region: Southwestern
- Municipality: Centar Župa

Population (2021)
  - Total: 104
- Time zone: UTC+1 (CET)
  - Summer (DST): UTC+2 (CEST)
- Car plates: DB
- Website: .

Breštani (Macedonian: Брештани, Turkish: Breştanik) is a village in the municipality of Centar Župa, North Macedonia.

== Demographics ==
Breštani (Birzdan) appears in the Ottoman defter of 1467 as a village in the vilayet of Dulgobrda. The settlement had a total of 11 households and the anthroponyms recorded attest to a mixed Albanian-Slavic character, with instances of Slavicisation (e.g., Martin Shpani, Dimitri Filsha, Haranec son of Sima etc.). According to Ottoman tahrir defters from the 1520s, 16 villages (all present-day Centar Župa villages) associated with Kala-i Kodžadžik had no Muslim population. However, the Muslim population increased in subsequent years. This was likely part of the Islamization of Macedonia under Turkish rule. Breštani is again recorded in the Ottoman defter of 1583 as a village in the vilayet of Dulgobrda. The settlement had grown to 107 households with 80 Muslim families. Alongside Muslim anthroponyms, which due to Islamisation sometimes appear in combination with Albanian names (i.e Pervane Gjoni; Bali Hasani; etc.), mixed Slavic-Albanian names also appear, with the Albanian anthroponyms often exhibiting instances of Slavicisation (e.g., Kolë Bozhiq-i; Gjon Baro; Gjon Jovan-i; Pal Pejo; Ivan Duka; Bojko Gjini; Petko Pali etc.).

According to Jovan Hadži Vasiljević's work "Muslims of Our Blood in Southern Serbia" (Muslimani naše krvi u Južnoj Srbiji. Beograd 1924), the village of Breštani had a population of approximately 900. More than 600 of these were Muslims (Torbeši). Some of the names of parts of the village are: Osoj, Cupuljčica, Asanov Pot (put), Grbov Kamen, Starci.

According to the 1942 Albanian census, Breštani was inhabited by 258 Muslim Albanians.

As of the 2021 census, Breštani had 104 residents with the following ethnic composition:

- Turks 101
- Persons for whom data are taken from administrative sources 3

According to the 2002 census, the village had a total of 120 inhabitants. Ethnic groups in the village include:

- Turks 120
