= Mal Papradnik =

- Village
- Мал Папрадник
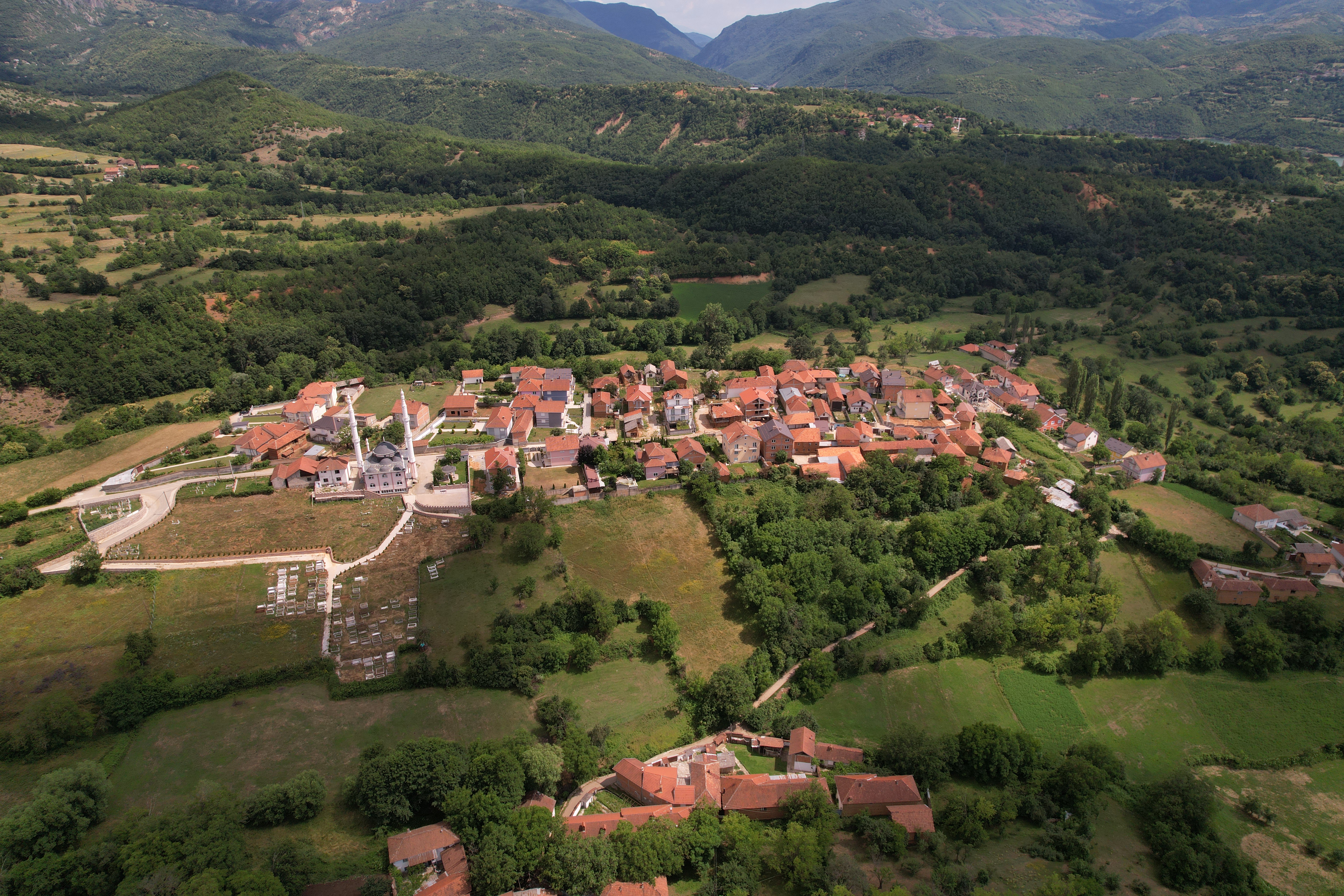
- Airview of the village

- Location within North Macedonia
- Coordinates: 41°28′18″N 20°32′48″E
- Country: North Macedonia
- Region: Southwestern
- Municipality: Centar Župa

Population (2002)
  - Total: 486
- Time zone: UTC+1 (CET)
  - Summer (DST): UTC+2 (CEST)
- Car plates: DB
- Website: .

Mal Papradnik (Macedonian: Мал Папрадник; Turkish: Küçük Papradnik) is a village in the municipality of Centar Župa, North Macedonia.

== Demographics ==
According to Ottoman tahrir defters from the 1520s, 16 villages (all present-day Centar Župa villages) associated with Kala-i Kodžadžik had no Muslim population. However, the Muslim population increased in subsequent years. This was likely part of the Islamization of Macedonia under Turkish rule.

Mal Papradnik has traditionally been inhabited by a Turks (Torbeši) population.

According to the 2002 census, the village had a total of 486 inhabitants. Ethnic groups in the village include:

- Turks 455
- Macedonians 25
- Others 6
