= Dolgaš =

Dolgaš Долгаш Dolgaş
- Village
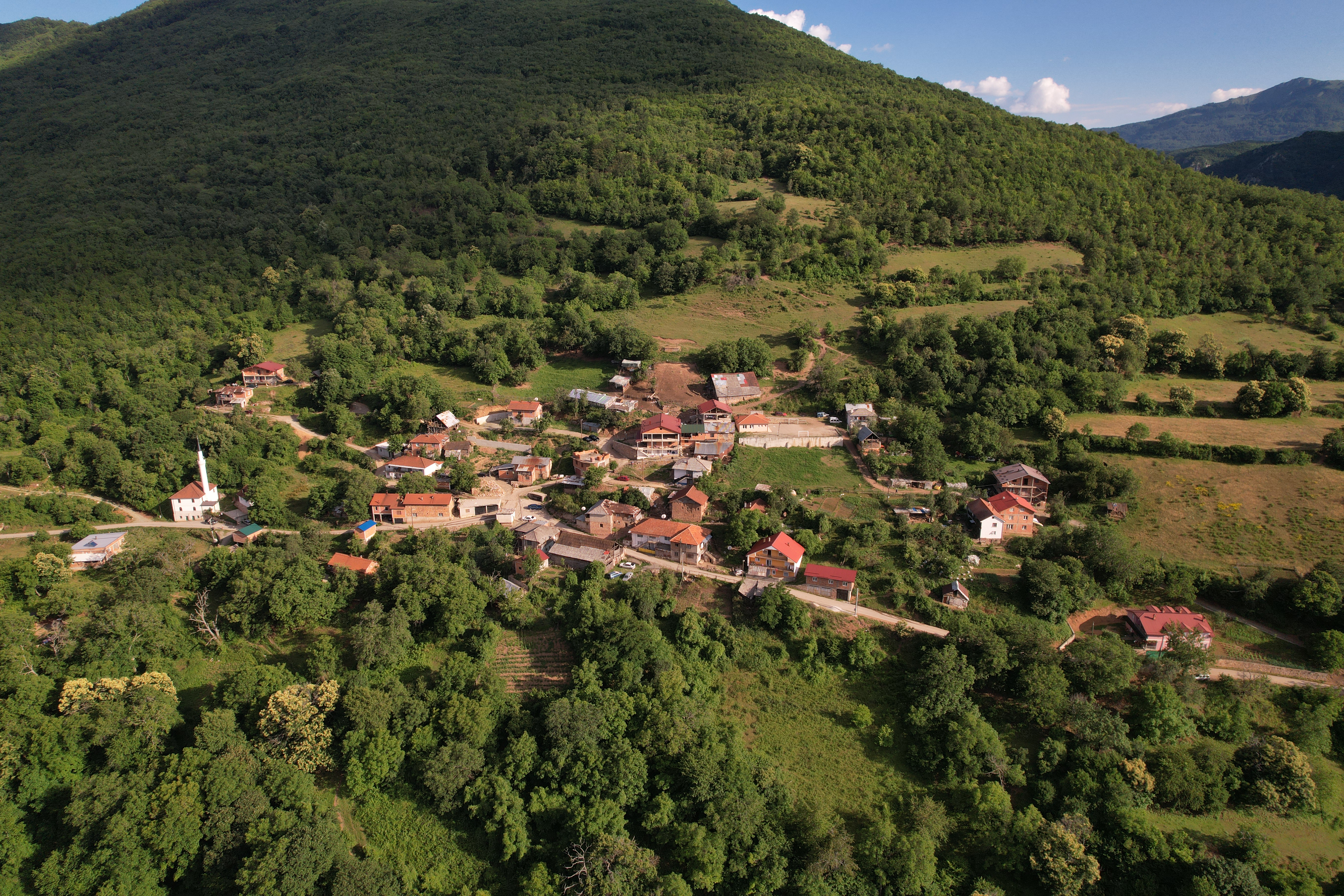
- Airview of the village

- Location within North Macedonia
- Coordinates: 41°25′23″N 20°35′15″E
- Country: North Macedonia
- Region: Southwestern
- Municipality: Centar Župa

Population (2002)
  - Total: 123
- Time zone: UTC+1 (CET)
  - Summer (DST): UTC+2 (CEST)
- Car plates: DB
- Website: .

Dolgaš (Macedonian: Долгаш, Turkish: Dolgaş) is a village in the municipality of Centar Župa, North Macedonia.

== Demographics ==
Dolgaš (Dulgash) is recorded in the Ottoman defter of 1467 as a village in the vilayet of Upper Dibra, part of the timar of Muhidin. The settlement had a total of 2 households with the anthroponymy attested being of a mixed Albanian-Slavic character.

The village is inhabited by a Turkish speaking population consisting of Turks or Torbeši.

According to the 2002 census, the village had a total of 123 inhabitants. Ethnic groups in the village include:

- Turks 123
