= Gorno Melničani =

- Village
- Горно Мелничани
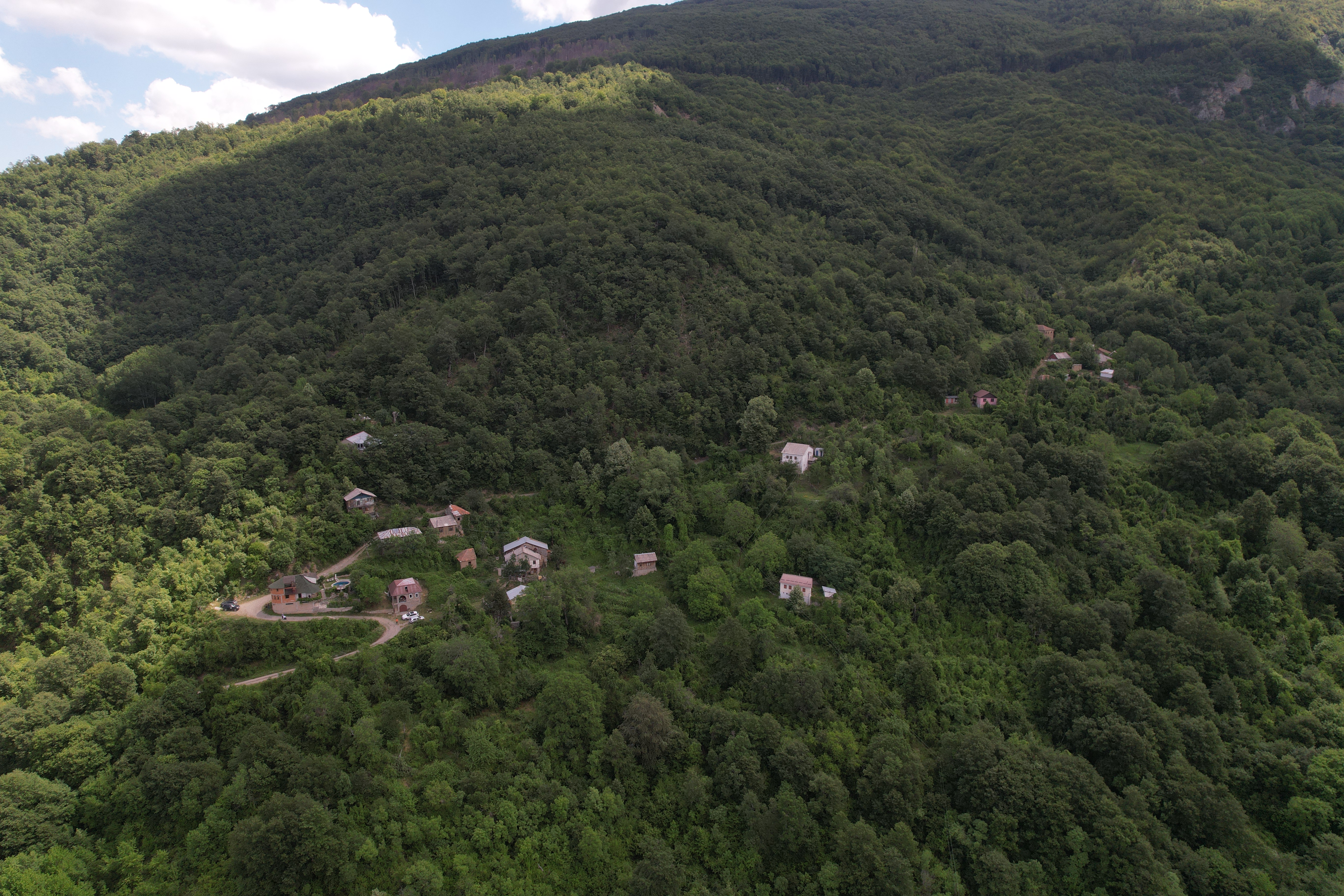
- Airview of the village

- Location within North Macedonia
- Coordinates: 41°31′08″N 20°35′17″E
- Country: North Macedonia
- Region: Southwestern
- Municipality: Centar Župa

Population (2002)
  - Total: 0
- Time zone: UTC+1 (CET)
  - Summer (DST): UTC+2 (CEST)
- Car plates: DB
- Website: .

Gorno Melničani (Macedonian: Горно Мелничани) is an uninhabited village in the municipality of Centar Župa, North Macedonia.

== Demographics ==
Gorno Melničani (Gorna-Menliçani) is attested in the Ottoman defter of 1467 as a village in the ziamet of Reka which was under the authority of Karagöz Bey. The village had a total of six households and the anthroponymy attested depicts a mixed Albanian-Slavic character with instances of Slavicisation; as is depicted in the case of Andrija Zogovići, his surname being formed from the Albanian zog ("bird") and Slavic suffix -ići.

According to the 1942 Albanian census, Gorno Melničani was inhabited by 193 Bulgarians.

Gorno Melničani has traditionally been inhabited by an Orthodox Macedonian and Torbeš population.

According to the 2002 census, the village had a total of 0 inhabitants.
