= Žubrino =

Žubrino Жубрино Zhubrinë
- Village
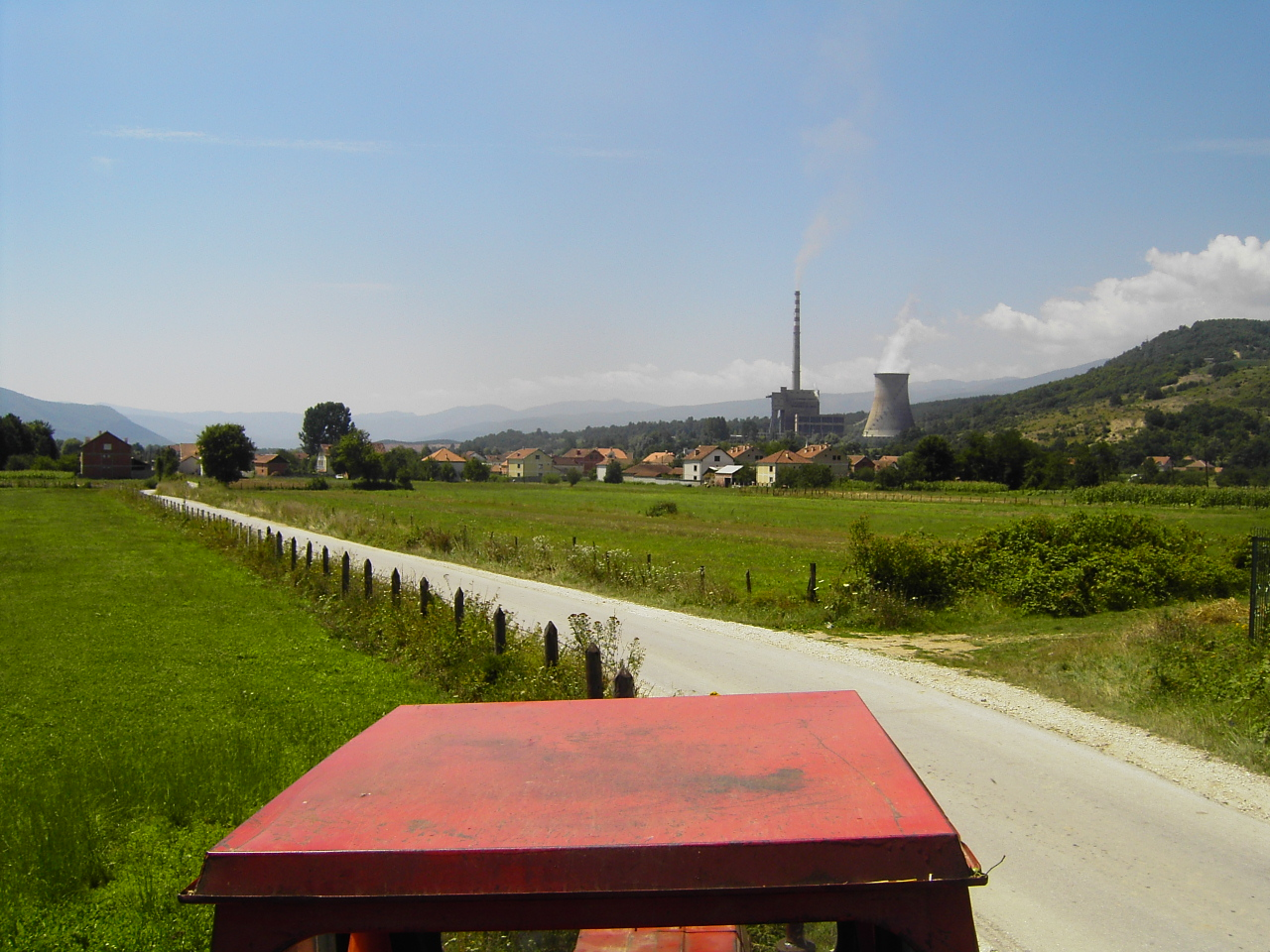

- Location within North Macedonia
- Coordinates: 41°35′N 21°01′E
- Country: North Macedonia
- Region: Southwestern
- Municipality: Kičevo

Population (2021)
  - Total: 203
- Time zone: UTC+1 (CET)
  - Summer (DST): UTC+2 (CEST)
- Car plates: KI
- Website: .

Žubrino (Macedonian: Жубрино, Albanian: Zhubrinë) is a village in the municipality of Kičevo, North Macedonia. It used to be part of the former municipality of Oslomej.

== Demographics ==
The village is attested in the 1467/68 Ottoman tax registry (defter) for the Nahiyah of Kırçova. The village had a total of 2 houses, excluding bachelors (mucerred).

According to the 1942 Albanian census, Žubrino was inhabited by a total of 253 Muslim Albanians.

As of the 2021 census, Žubrino had 203 residents with the following ethnic composition:

- Albanians 198
- Persons for whom data are taken from administrative sources 5

According to the 2002 census, the village had a total of 547 inhabitants. Ethnic groups in the village include:

- Albanians – 306
- Others – 3
