= Bajramovci =

Bajramovci Бајрамовци
- Village
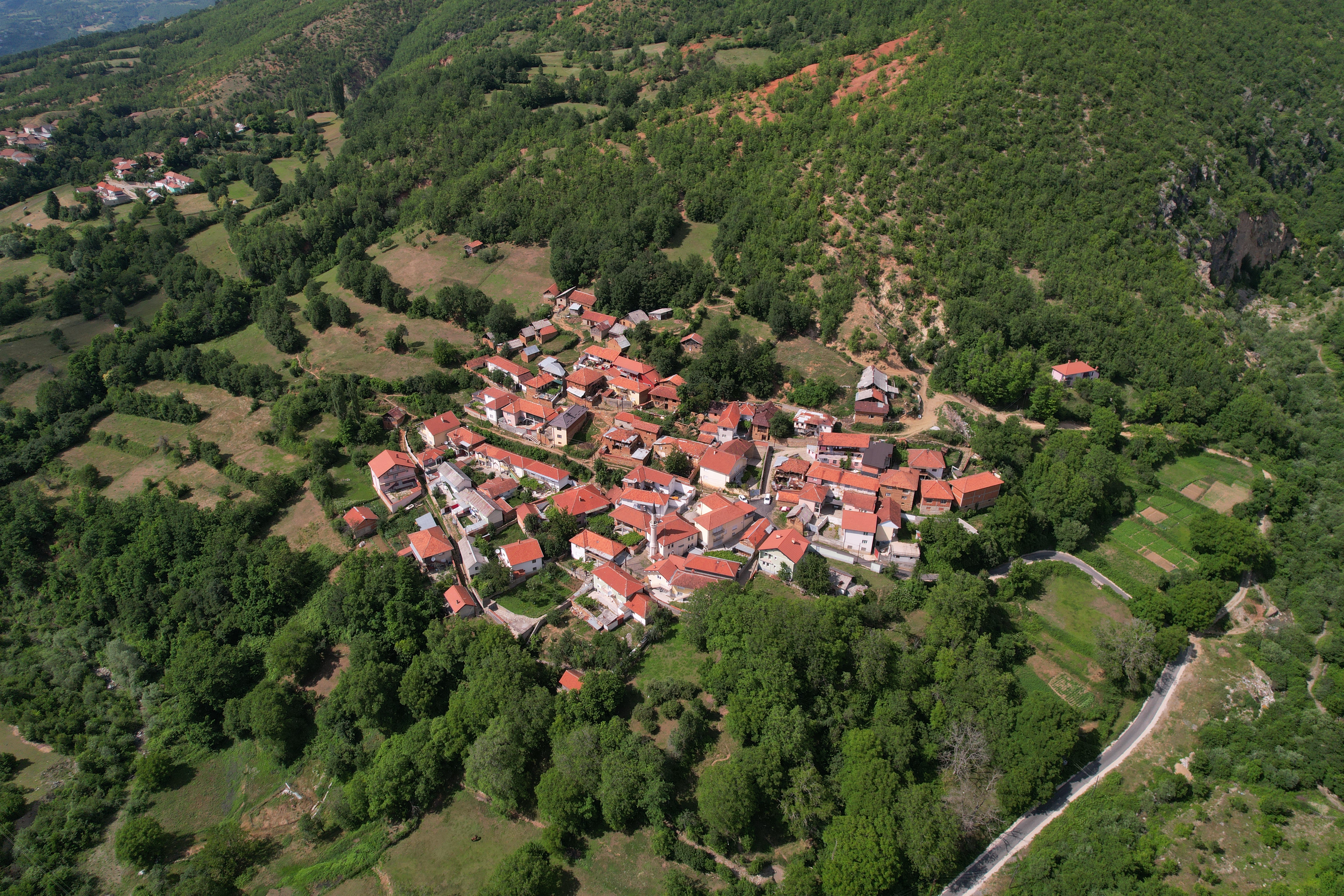
- Airview of the village

- Location within North Macedonia
- Coordinates: 41°28′53″N 20°34′15″E
- Country: North Macedonia
- Region: Southwestern
- Municipality: Centar Župa

Population (2021)
  - Total: 104
- Time zone: UTC+1 (CET)
  - Summer (DST): UTC+2 (CEST)
- Car plates: DB
- Website: .

Bajramovci (Macedonian: Бајрамовци) is a village in the municipality of Centar Župa, North Macedonia. Bajramovci was once a former neighbourhood of the village of Balanci and in 1965 elevated to the status of an independent village. The population density of the village is 6.4 km2.

== Name ==
The toponym Bajramovci is a patronymic formation derived from the name Bajram and the suffix ovci.

== Demographics ==
Bajramovci has traditionally been inhabited by a Turks (Torbeši) population.

As of the 2021 census, Bajramovci had 104 residents with the following ethnic composition:

- Turks 81
- Persons for whom data are taken from administrative sources 22
- Albanians 1

According to the 2002 census, the village had a total of 117 inhabitants. Ethnic groups in the village include:

- Turks 117
