= Popolžani =

Popolžani Пополжани
- Village
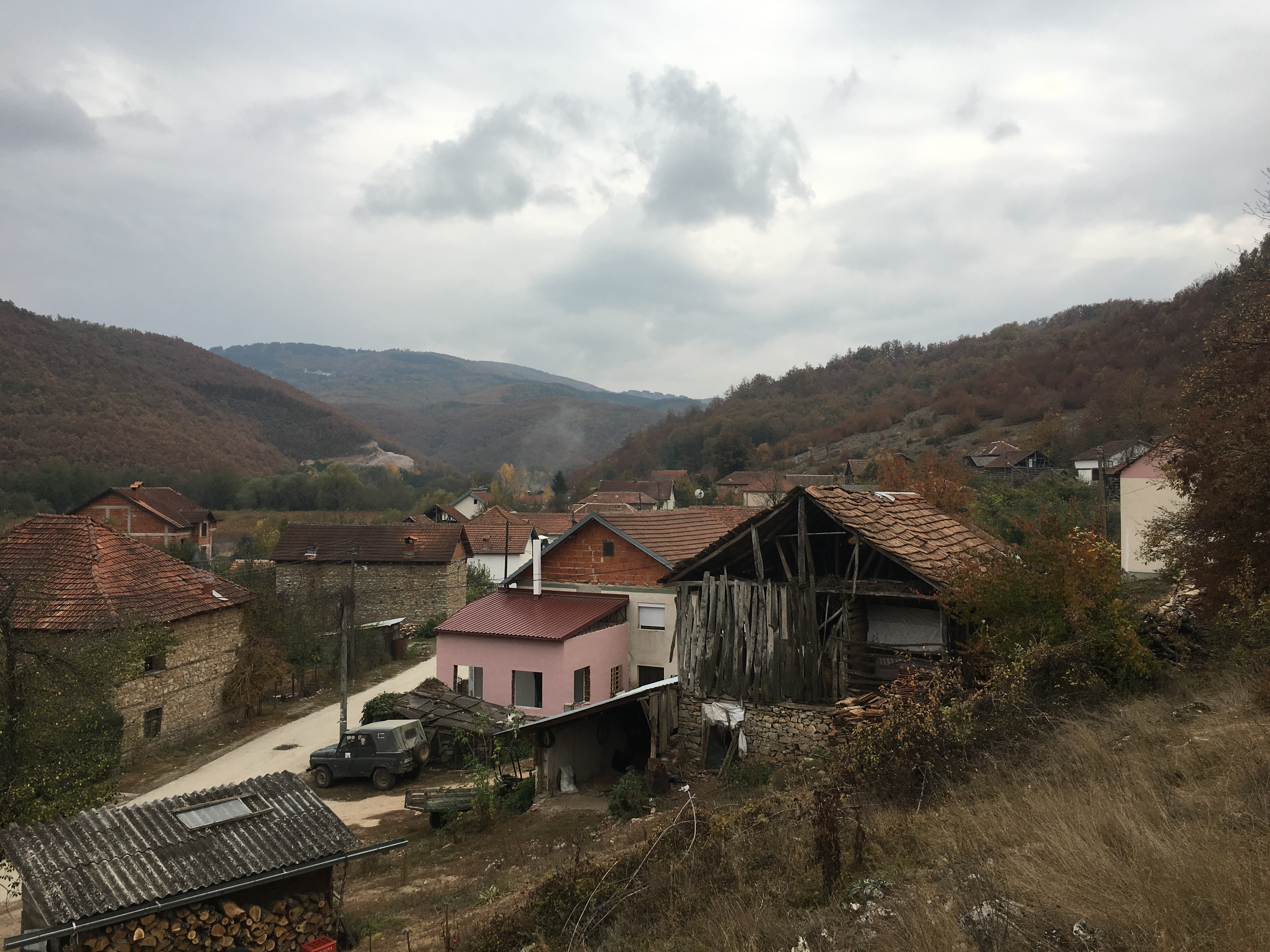

- Location within North Macedonia
- Coordinates: 41.477820°N 20.921276°E
- Country: North Macedonia
- Region: Southwestern
- Municipality: Kičevo

Population (2021)
  - Total: 115
- Time zone: UTC+1 (CET)
  - Summer (DST): UTC+2 (CEST)
- Website: .

Popolžani (Macedonian: Пополжани) is a village in the municipality of Kičevo, North Macedonia. It used to be part of the former Drugovo Municipality.

== Demographics ==
The village is attested in the 1467/68 Ottoman tax registry (defter) for the Nahiyah of Kırçova. The village had a total of 10 houses, excluding bachelors (mucerred).

According to the 1942 Albanian census, Popolžani was inhabited by a total of 171 Bulgarians.

According to the 2002 census, the village had a total of 109 inhabitants. Ethnic groups in the village include:

- Macedonians 108
- Serbs 1

As of the 2021 census, Popolžani had 115 residents with the following ethnic composition:

- Macedonians 114
- Others 1
