= Centar Župa =

Centar Župa Центар Жупа Merkez Jupa
- Village
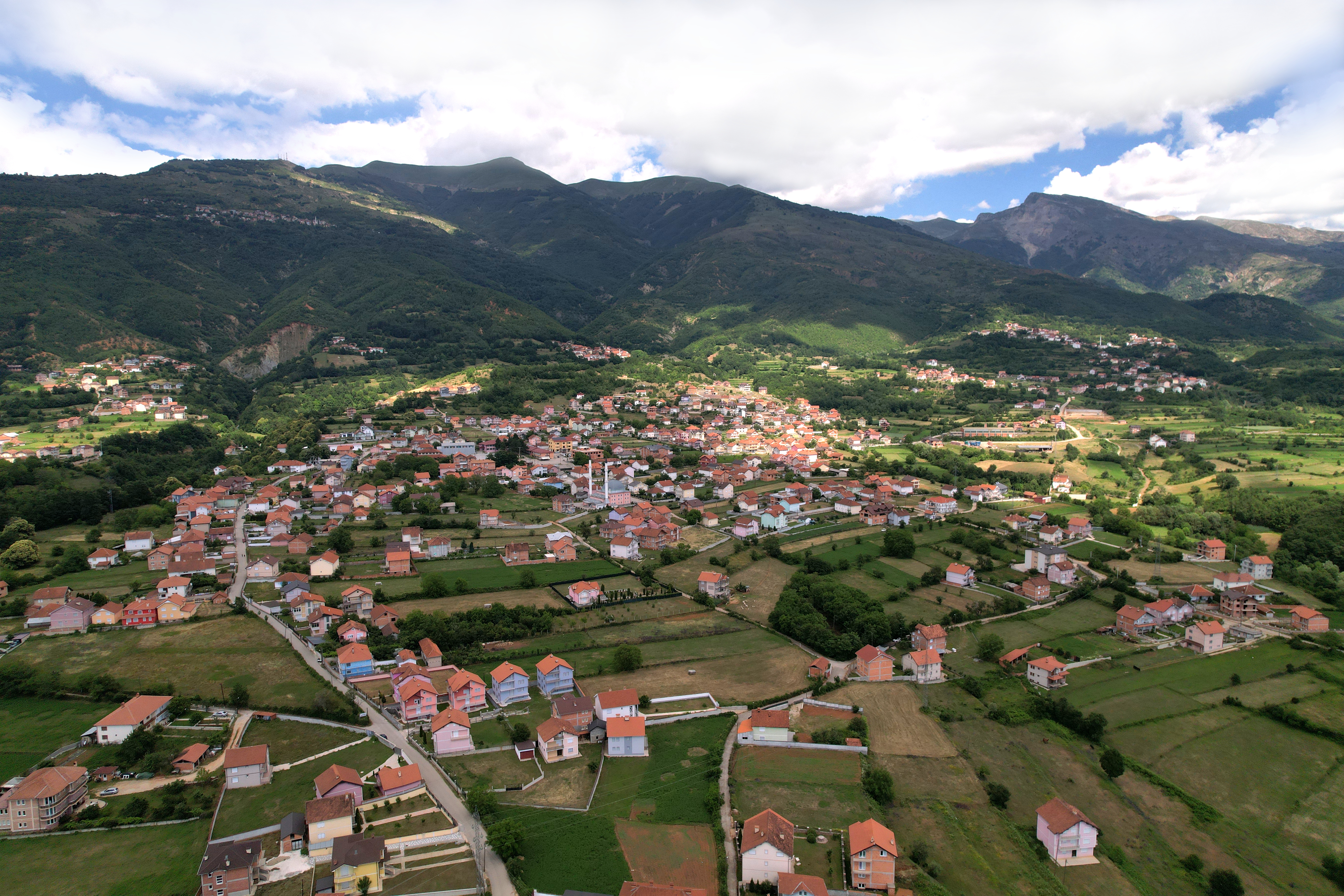
- Airview of the village

- Location within North Macedonia
- Country: North Macedonia
- Region: Southwestern
- Municipality: Centar Župa

Population (2021)
  - Total: 354

Official Language(s)
  - primary: Macedonian
  - secondary: Turkish
- Time zone: UTC+1 (CET)
  - Summer (DST): UTC+2 (CEST)
- Vehicle registration: DB
- Website: .

Centar Župa (Macedonian: Центар Жупа; Turkish: Merkez Jupa) is a village and seat in the municipality of Centar Župa, North Macedonia. The town is inhabited mainly by Turks.

== Demographics ==
Centar Župa is a new village formed by families who settled in the area and originate from the villages of Balanci, Bajramovci, Crno Boci, Golem Papradnik and Mal Papradnik.

As of the 2021 census, Centar Župa had 354 residents with the following ethnic composition:

- Turks 304
- Macedonians 33
- Persons for whom data are taken from administrative sources 13
- Albanians 4

According to the 2002 census, the village had a total of 800 inhabitants. Ethnic groups in the village include:

- Turks 714
- Macedonians 80
- Albanians 4
- Others 2
