= Kodžadžik =

Kodžadžik Коџаџик Kocacık
- Village
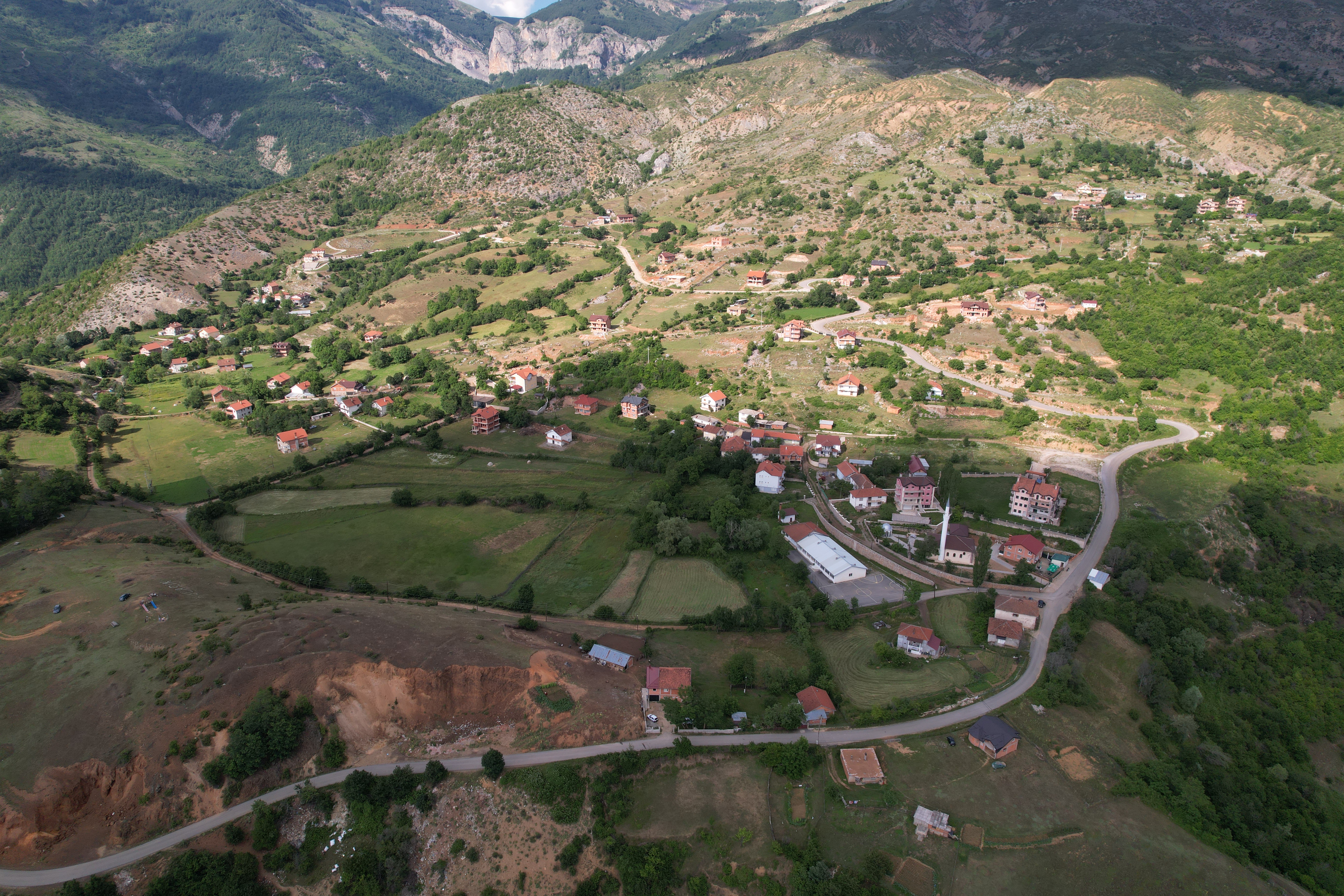
- Airview of the village

- Location within North Macedonia
- Coordinates: 41°27′N 20°36′E
- Country: North Macedonia
- Region: Southwestern
- Municipality: Centar Župa

Population (2021)
  - Total: 146
- Time zone: UTC+1 (CET)
  - Summer (DST): UTC+2 (CEST)
- Car plates: DB
- Website: .

Kodžadžik (Macedonian: Коџаџик; Turkish: Kocacık), is a village in the municipality of Centar Župa, North Macedonia.

== Name ==
A former Ottoman fortress existed at the location of Kodžadžik before the end of the first half of the 15th century. Scholars such as Smiljanić and Hadži Vasiljević stated that a battle between Skanderbeg and the Ottoman Turks took place in the area, and that the name of the village derives from the Ottoman Turkish expression kocacenk, which means big battle.

== History ==
It was known as Svetigrad before the Ottoman conquest in 1448, in which Ottoman forces captured it from forces of the League of Lezhë after sieging it for three months.

The local church was converted to an Ottoman mosque, and Kodžadžik, as part of the sanjak (district) Debra-i Bala, became a center that connected the southeast with Albania and the Adriatic Sea. The fortress of Kodžadžik is recorded in the Ottoman defter of 1467 with 51 household heads being attested who were exempt from paying the haraç tax as long as they maintained the upper fortress. The personal names recorded are of a mixed local Albanian-Slavic (and more generally Christian) character. No Turkic settlers were recorded.

The carpenters of the upper castle, who were also exempt from taxes, were: Gjin Drodgjeri; Bogiçe, son of Gjin; and Aleko, son of Gjin.

During the Ottoman era, the local population converted to Islam and adopted a Turkish identity. Kodžadžik is known for the house of Mustafa Kemal Atatürk's parents. The memorial house of Kemal Atatürk's father was reconstructed in Kodžadžik.

On his ethnic map of Northwestern Macedonia in 1929, Afanasy Selishchev marked Kodžadžik as a mixed Bulgarian-Turkish (Muslim) village.

== Castle ==
The castle of Kodžadžik lays in the middle of the valley bordering the village of Kodžadžik to the southeast and Breštani to the northwest. The positioning of the castle gives it favorable strategic control several surrounding areas such as the Black Drin, the Debar-Kodžadžik road, Dibër County and the settlements of Debar. At the Kodžadžik Castle, there are traces of habitation dating back to the Late Bronze Age and Early Iron Age, as well as the Late Antiquity and medieval periods. The topographical location of Kodžadžik Castle closely aligns with Barleti's description of the city of Sfetigrad, to the extent that it appears almost identical. Furthermore according to Barleti, the castle of Sfetigrad (Kodžadžik) was similar in size to the castle of Stelushi and shared a comparable topographical position, a detail that has been affirmed by archaeological excavations. Parts of the fortification system from the Late Antiquity and medieval periods are present on the upper platform of its level rocky surface. This platform has a polygonal plan with a perimeter of 145 meters, measuring 58 meters in length and 34 meters in width, covering an area of approximately 1,600 square meters. The walls follow the contours of the crest, except on the southern side, where they enclose two narrow terraces suitable for habitation. The fortification takes advantage of the natural defensive features of the rocky crest, at times incorporating natural rock formations into its structure or discontinuing where the slopes are rocky or particularly steep. The Late Antiquity wall represents the earliest fortification of Kodžadžik Castle. It was constructed using river and natural stones bound with limestone mortar, the opus incertum technique was used for its construction. The castle was extensively refortified during the medieval period, with damaged sections repaired and new fortification lines constructed. From a chronological perspective, the medieval fortification of Kodžadžik Castle dates to the 14th-15th centuries AD. This period is evidenced by the construction techniques of the surrounding walls, their narrow width, the characteristics of the limestone-based mortar, and the use of iron scaffolding during construction.

== Demographics ==
The village is inhabited by a Turkish-speaking population consisting of Turks. According to a 2014 study conducted on immigrants from Elevci and Kodžadžik villages by Ali Dikici, Elevci and Kodžadžik were Macedonian Muslim villages.

According to the 2002 census, the village had a total of 275 inhabitants, who were Turks. As of the 2021 census, Kodžadžik had 146 residents with the following ethnic composition:

- Turks 146
- Persons for whom data are taken from administrative sources 5
