= Centar Župa Municipality =

Municipality of North Macedonia

Centar Župa Municipality Општина Центар Жупа Merkez Jupa Belediyesi
- Rural municipality
- Flag Coat of arms

- Coordinates: 41.48°N 20.58°E
- Country: North Macedonia
- Region: Southwestern
- Municipal seat: Centar Župa

Government
  - Mayor: Arijan Ibraim (DPT)

Population
  - Total: 3,720

Official Language(s)
- Time zone: UTC+1 (CET)
- Official languages: Macedonian, Turkish
- Vehicle registration: MB

Centar Župa (Macedonian: Центар Жупа; Turkish: Merkez Jupa) is a municipality in the western part of North Macedonia. Centar Župa is also the name of the village where the municipal seat is found. Centar Župa Municipality is part of the Southwestern Statistical Region.

== History ==
When the Republic of Macedonia (now North Macedonia) proclaimed its independence in 1991, it implemented nationalist politics, which aimed to assimilate Macedonian Muslims into a broader category of "Macedonians". The government banned education in Turkish in all regions to "prevent Turkification". This, however, was met with resistance by Muslims who did not support the association and wanted to learn Turkish and continue their education in Turkish. The protests failed, although one person applied to the European Court of Human Rights. The case revolved around rights to education in the mother tongue.

== Geography ==
The municipality borders Struga Municipality to the south, Debar Municipality to the east, north and west, and Albania to the west.

== Demographics ==
The literature described the villages in the Upper Župa as Turkish, while it referred to Lower Župa as inhabited by Torbeši.

Mothers tongues in the municipality include (2021):

- Turkish: 2,209 (59.4%)
- Macedonian: 962 (25.9%)
- Persons for whom data are taken from administrative sources: 324 (9.5%)
- Albanian: 192 (5.2%)
- Others: 3 (0.1%)

Ethnic groups in the municipality according to the 2021 North Macedonia census:

	2002		2021	
	Number	%	Number	%
TOTAL	6,519	100	3,720	100
Turks	5,226	80.17	2,899	77.93
Macedonians	814	12.49	236	6.34
Albanians	454	6.96	187	5.03
Bosniaks			1	0.03
Other / Undeclared / Unknown	25	0.38	43	1.15
Persons for whom data are taken from administrative sources			354	9.52
