= Southwestern Statistical Region =

Coordinates: 41.5100°N 20.9700°E

Southwestern Statistical Region Југозападен Регион (Macedonian) Rajoni jugperendimor (Albanian)
- Statistical region
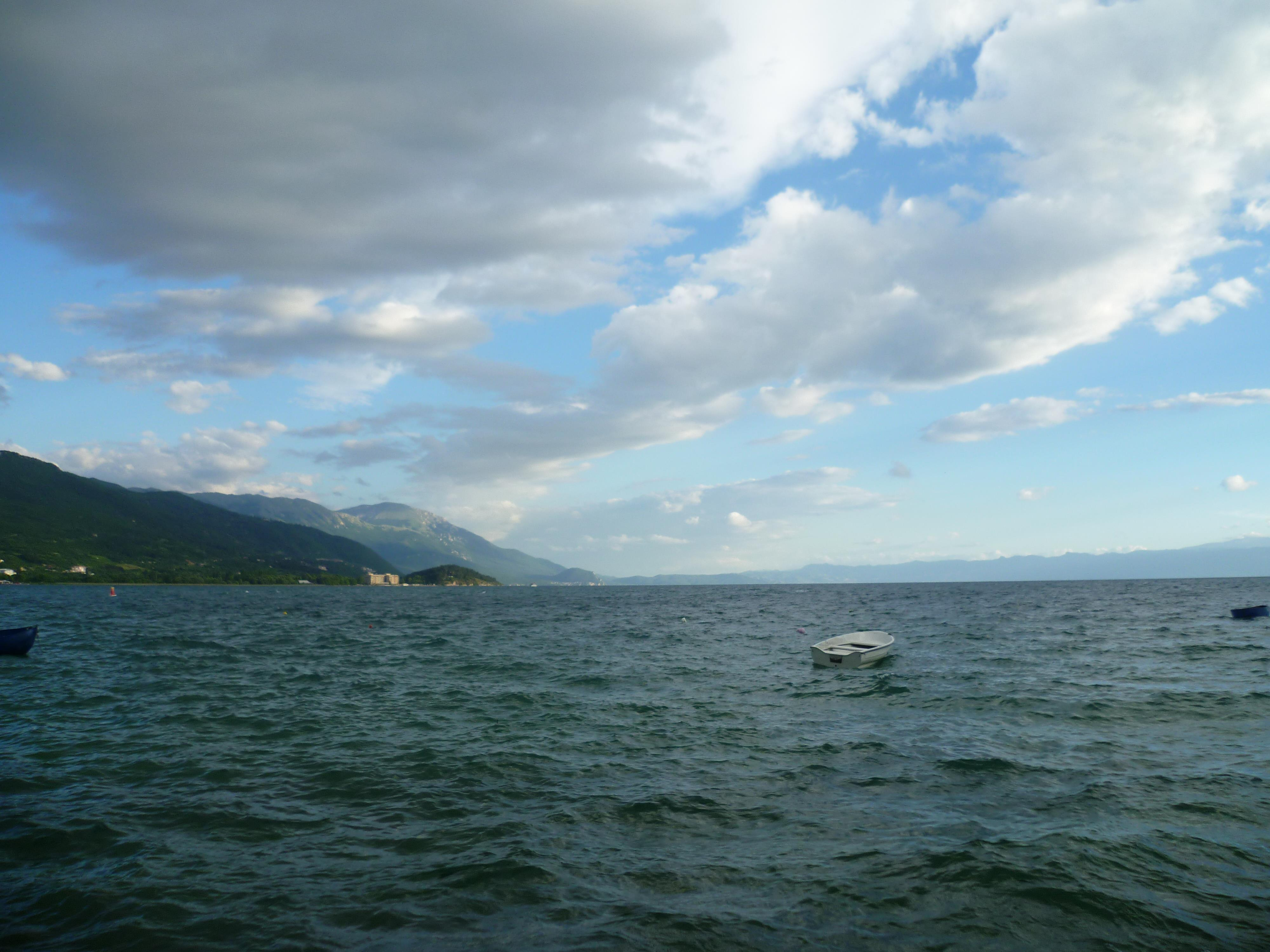
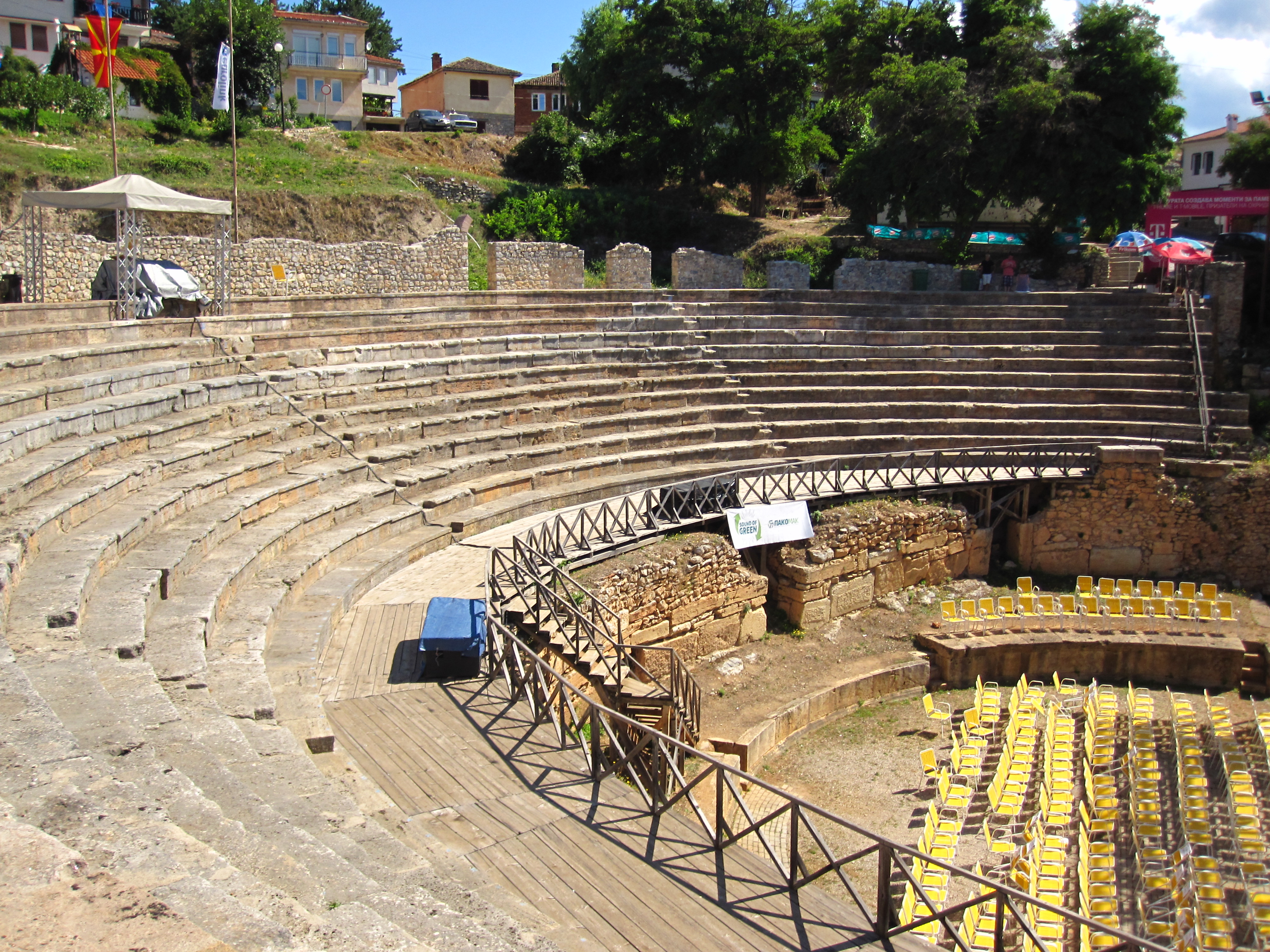
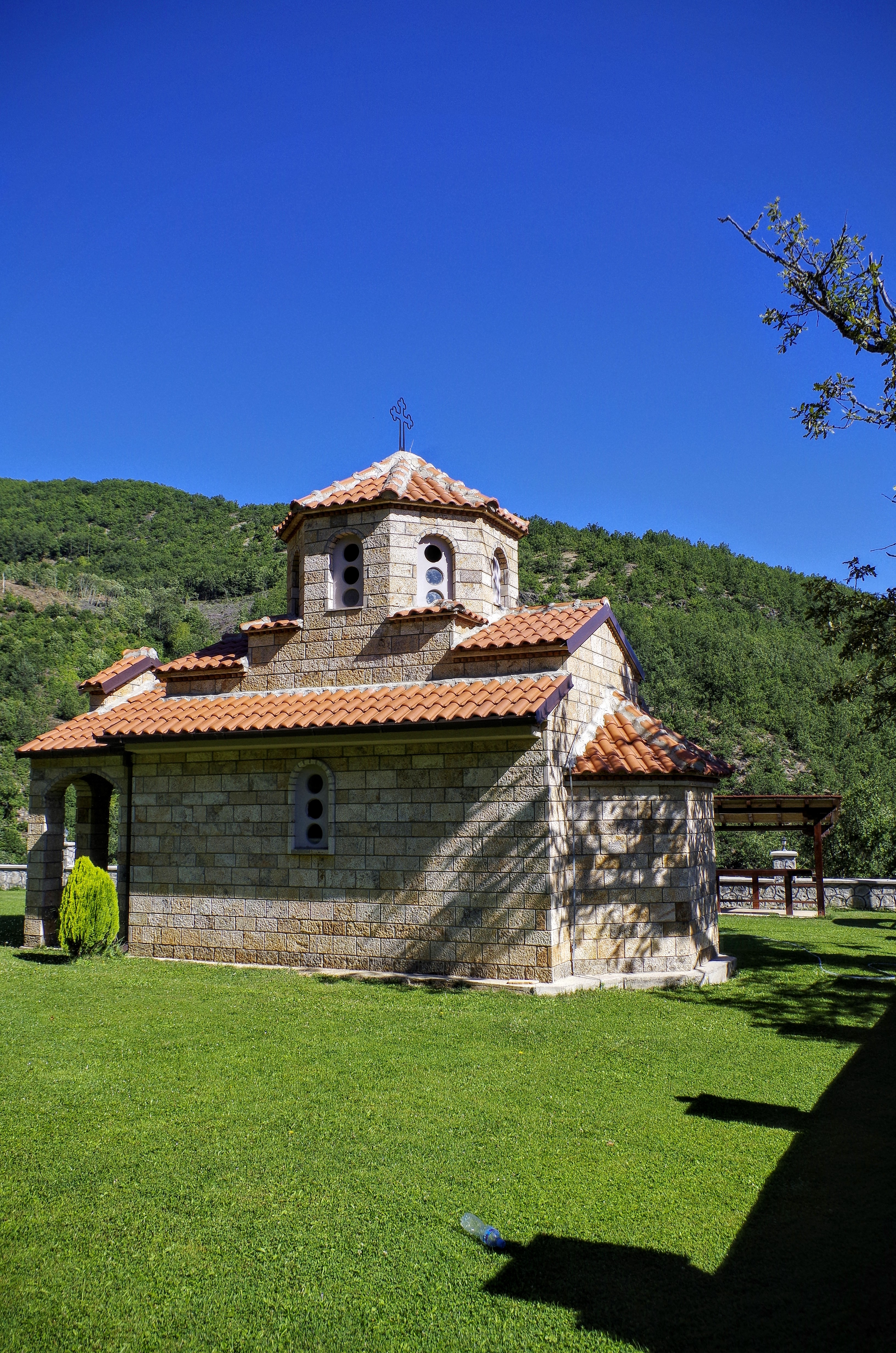
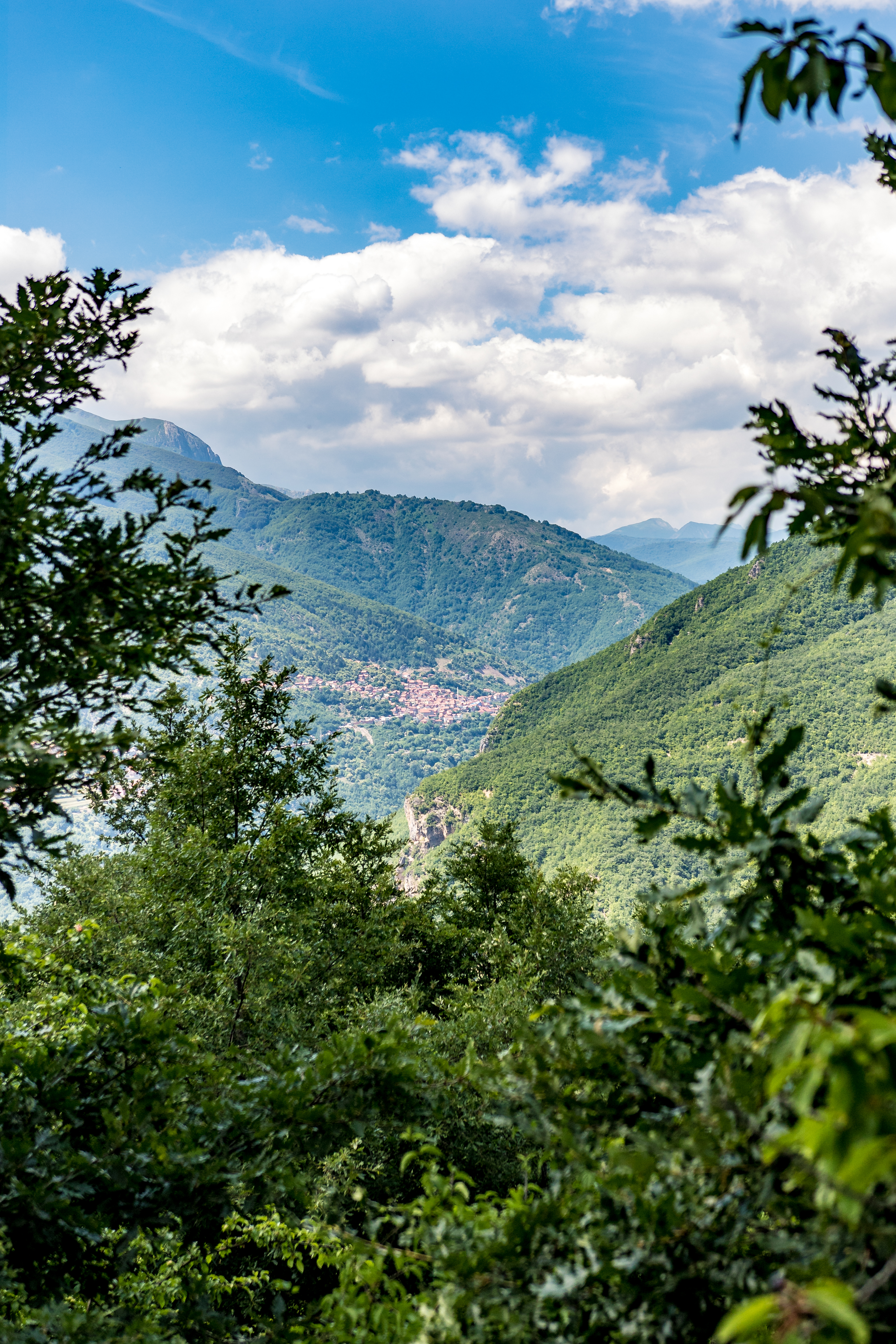
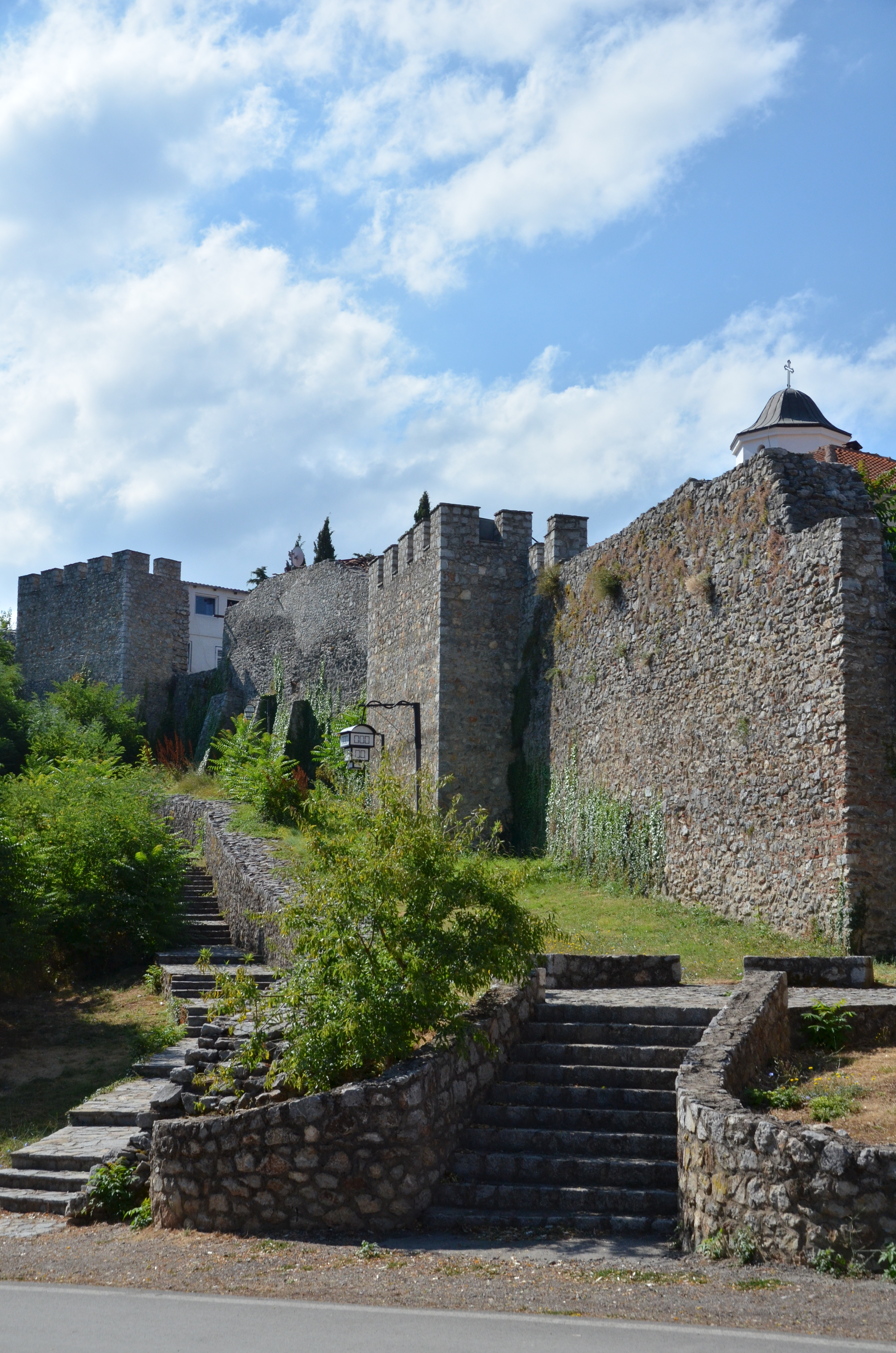
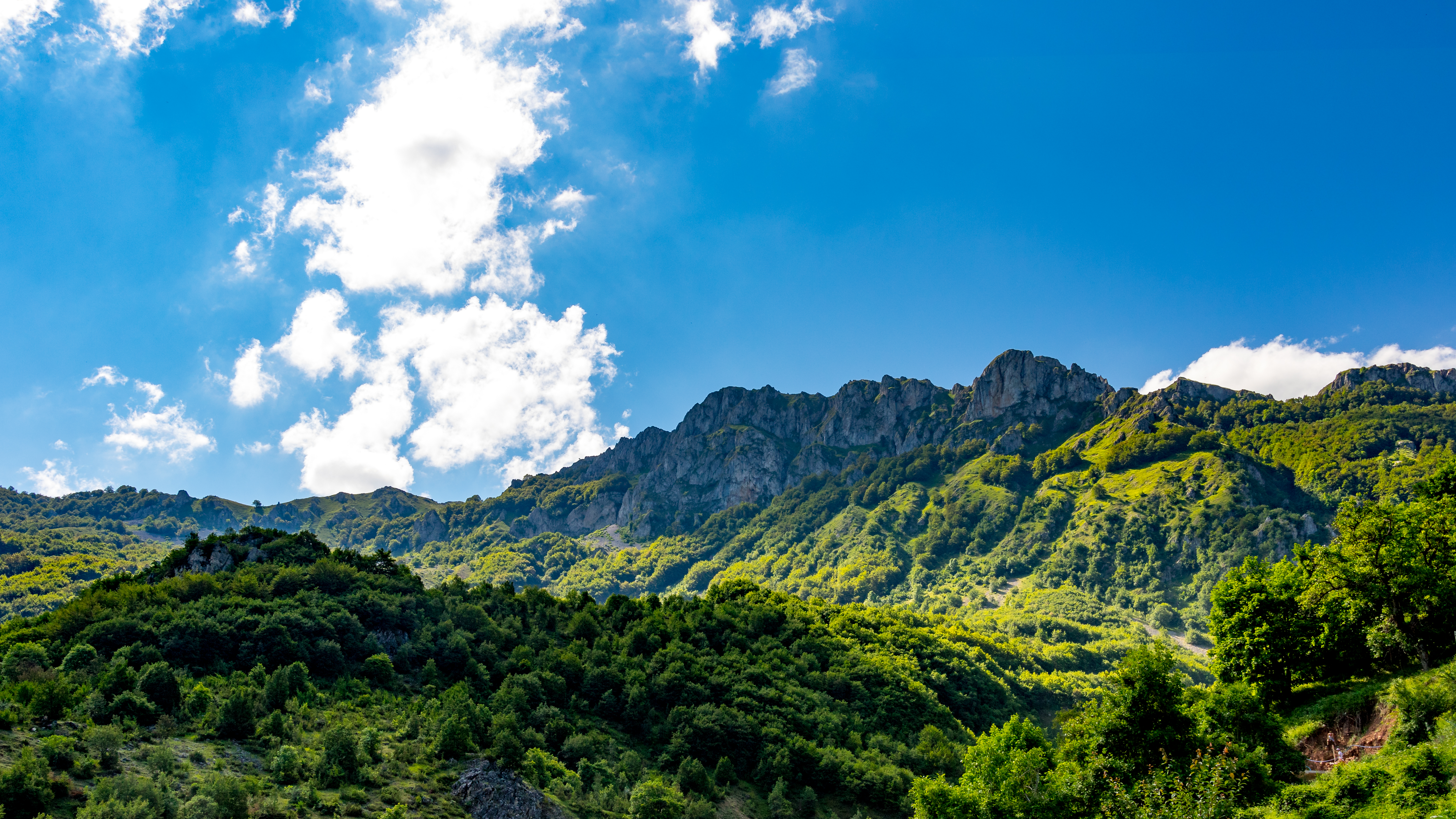
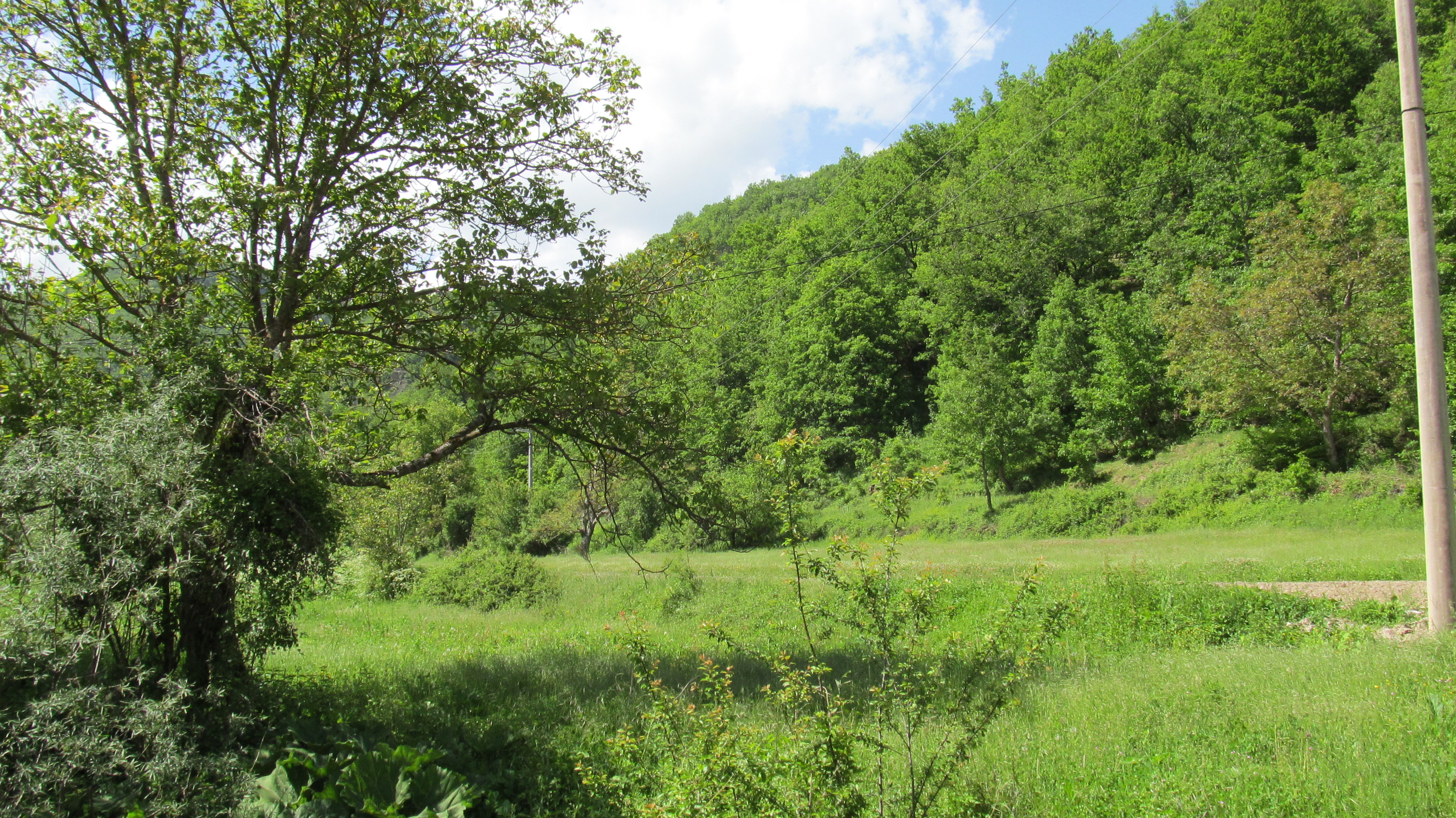
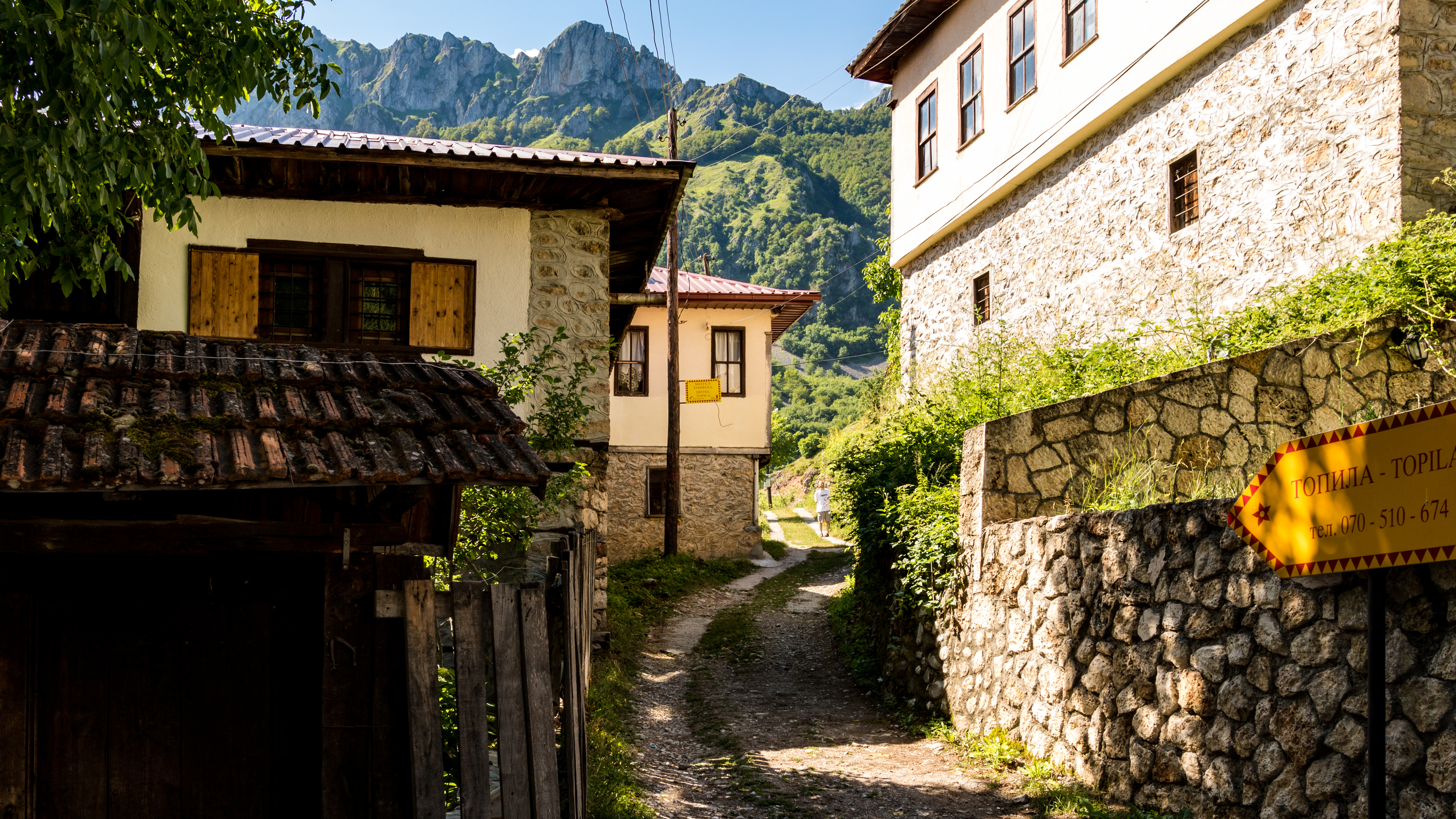
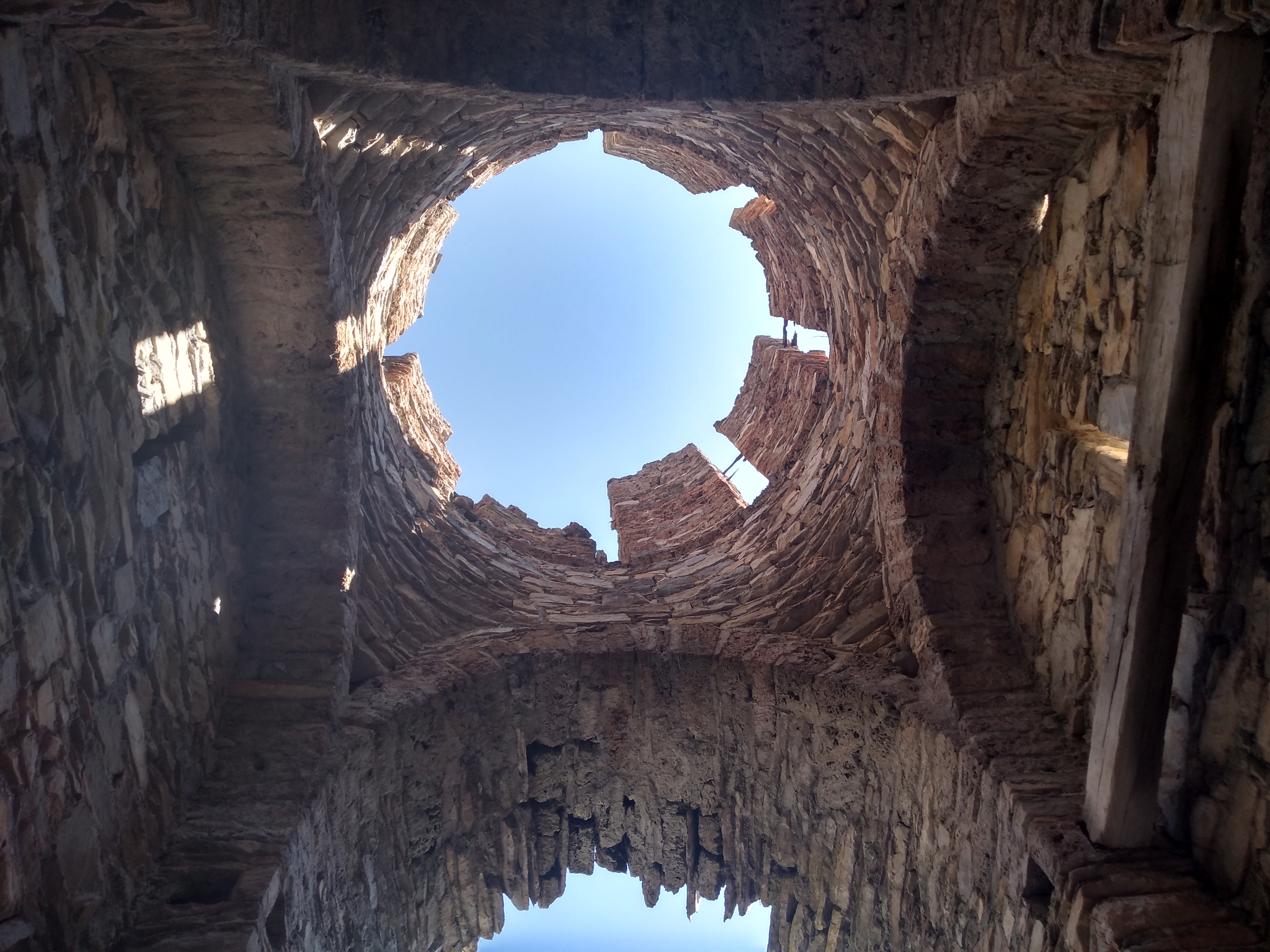
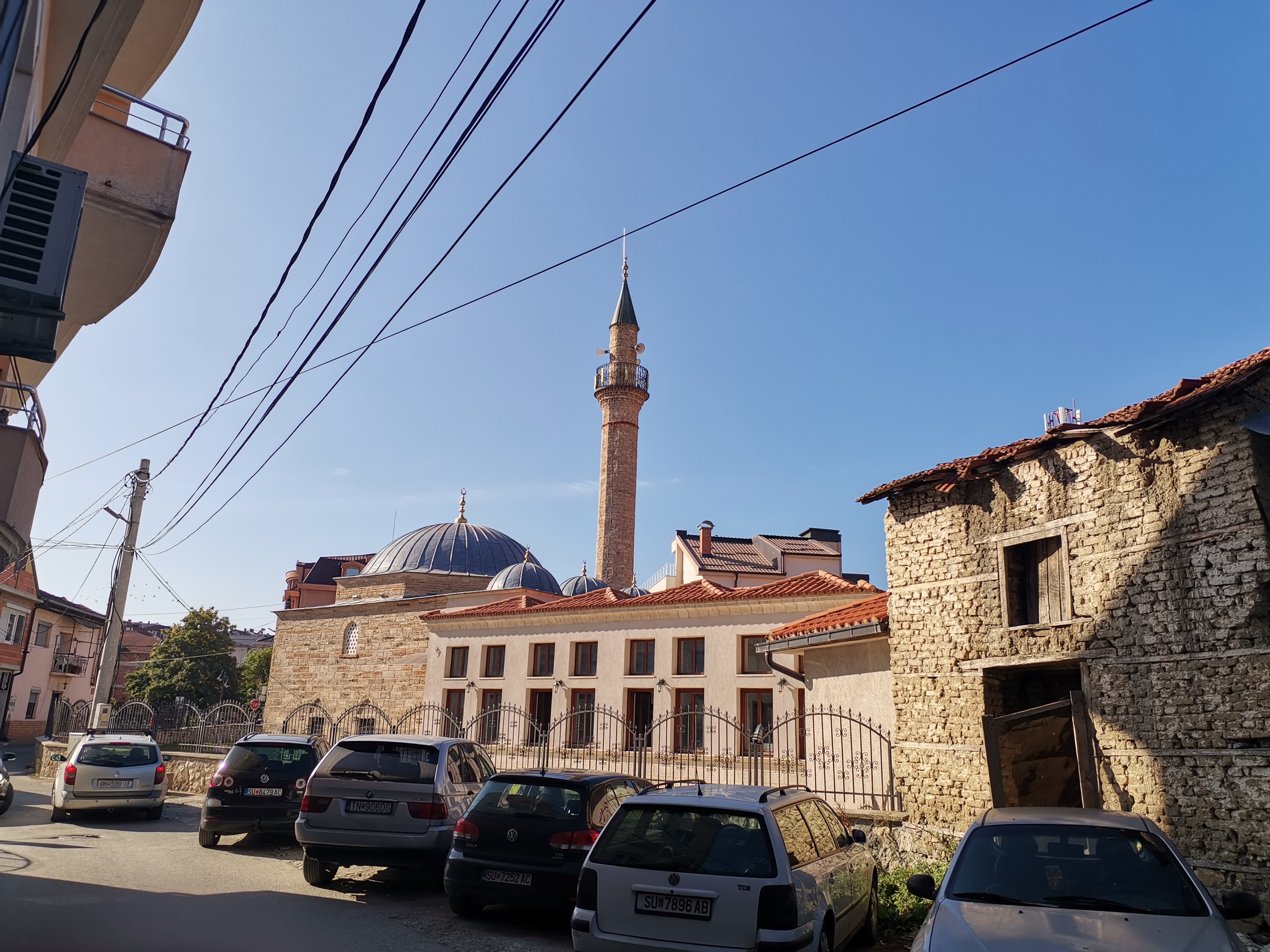
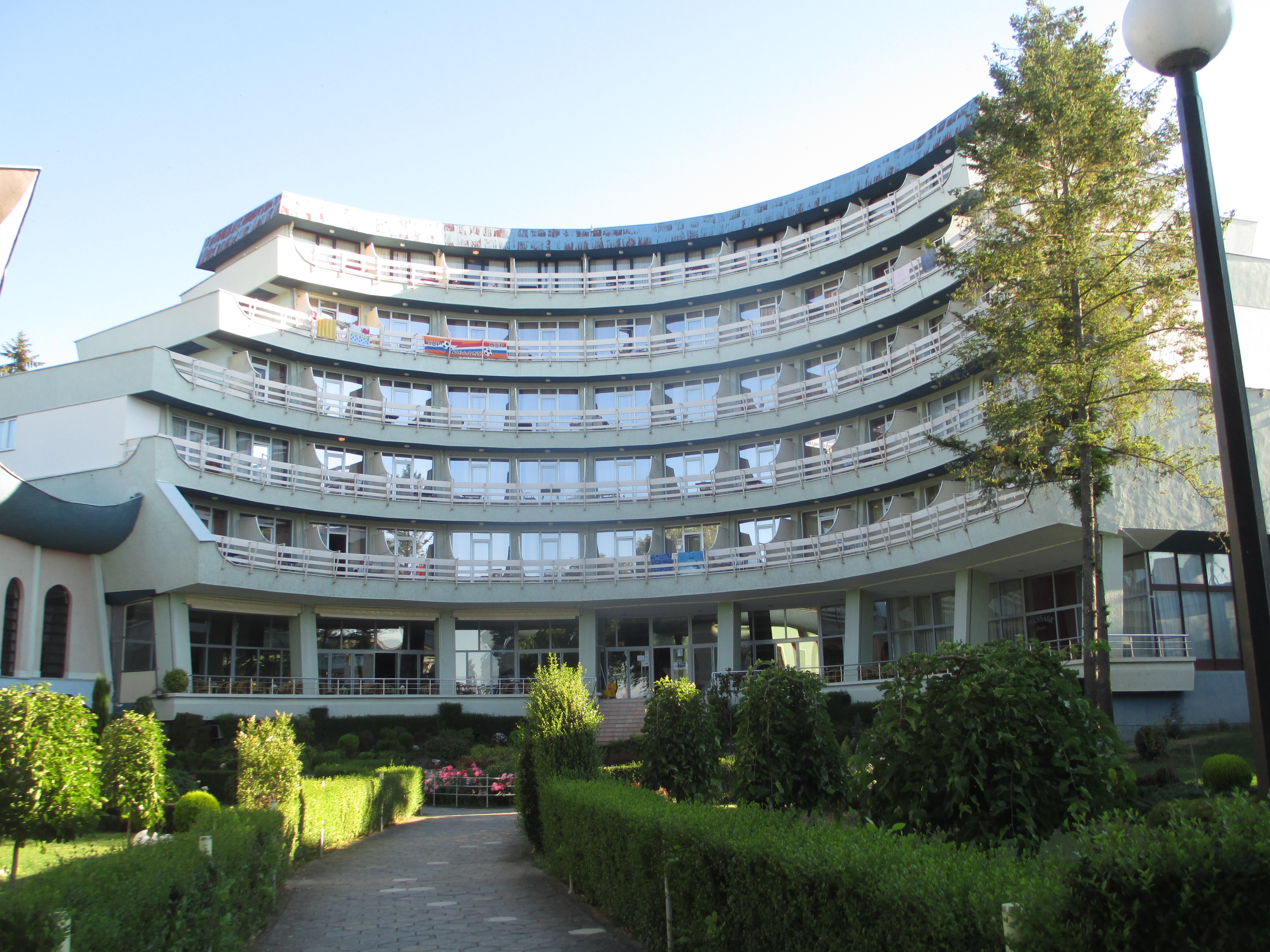
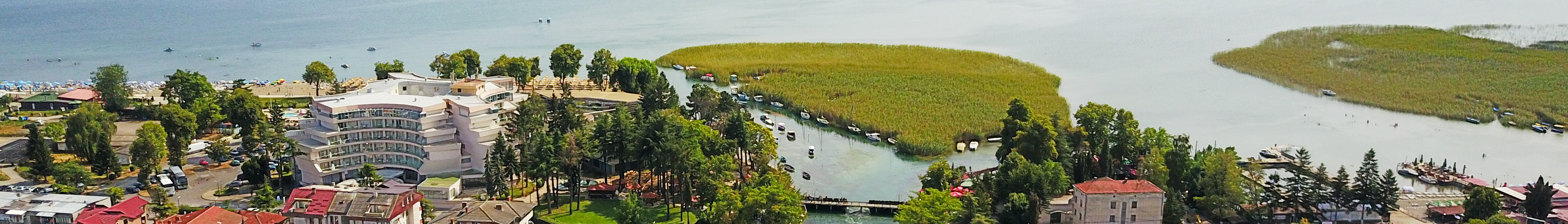

- Seal

- Country: North Macedonia

Area
  - Total: 3,280 km^{2} (1,270 sq mi)

Population (2021)
  - Total: 177,398
  - Density: 54.1/km^{2} (140/sq mi)
- HDI (2017): 0.758 high · 4th of 8
- Website: southwestregion.mk

The Southwestern Statistical Region (Macedonian: Југозападен Регион, romanized: Jugozapaden Region; Albanian: Rajoni jugperendimor) is one of eight statistical regions of North Macedonia. Southwestern, located in the western part of the country, sharing Ohrid Lake with its westerly border Albania. Internally, it borders the Pelagonia, Polog, Skopje, and Vardar statistical regions.

== Municipalities ==
Map of the municipalities of the region (2004-2013).

The Southwestern Statistical Region is divided into nine municipalities:

- Centar Župa
- Debar
- Debarca
- Kičevo
- Makedonski Brod
- Ohrid
- Plasnica
- Struga
- Vevčani

== Population ==
The current population of the Southwestern statistical region is 177,398 citizens, according to the last population census in 2021.

Census Year	Population	Change
1994	211,046	N/A
2002	221,546	+5.0%
2021	177,398	-19.9%

== Ethnicities ==
Map of the majority ethnic groups by municipality (2004-2013).

The largest ethnic group in the region are the Macedonian followed by the Albanians and Turks.

	2002		2021
	Number	%	Number	%
TOTAL	221,546	100	177,398	100
Macedonians	107,387	48.47	83,757	47.21
Albanians	81,896	36.97	52,849	29.79
Turks	21,433	9.67	17,832	10.05
Roma	2,899	1.31	3,570	2.01
Vlachs	1,059	0.48	882	0.5
Serbs	629	0.28	428	0.24
Bosniaks	144	0.07	145	0.09
Others / Undeclared / Unknown	6,099	2.75	5,161	2.91
Persons for whom data are taken from administrative sources			12,774	7.2

== Religions ==
Religious affiliation according to the 2002 and 2021 North Macedonia censuses:

Religion	2002		2021
Religion	Number	%	Number	%
TOTAL	221,546	100	177,398	100
Orthodox	103,013	46.5	67,108	47.2
Christians/Protestants	7	0.13	16,304	47.2
Catholics	296	0.00	271	47.2
Islam	116,395	52.5	80,612	45.4
Others	1,840	0.83	329	0.19
Refused/Undeclared			12,774	7.20
