= List of settlements along the River Drin =

This is a list of settlements located along the River Drin, its tributaries, and its distributaries. This includes the following rivers:

- The Drin in northern Albania.
- The White Drin in Kosovo and northern Albania, a tributary of the Drin.
  - The tributaries of the White Drin, namely Lumbardhi i Pejës (including the Haxhaj River, Čakorski Stream, Meteški Stream and Bjeluha River), Lumbardhi i Deçanit, Prue Stream, Erenik, Istok River (including the Kujafq River), Klina River, Mirusha River, Rimnik River, Toplluhë River, and Lumbardhi i Prizrenit.
- The Black Drin, a tributary of the Drin.
  - The tributaries of the Black Drin, namely the Zalli River, Perroi i Moglicës, Perroi i Borovës, Perroi i Maqellarës, Perroi i Grazhdanit, Perroi i Herebelit, Perroi i Erebarës, Perroi i Gjurasit, Perroi i Melanit, Perroi i Llixhave, Perroi i Bahutës, Perroi i Vilës, Malla River and Perroi i Bushtricës.
  - Debar Lake, formed by the damming of the Black Drin.
- The Great Drin (Albanian: Drini i Madhë), the section of the Drin that diverges into the Bojana.
- The Buna river (Serbo-Croatian: Bojana), a distributary of the Drin.

The list will start from the source of each river and end at the mouth. Major settlements (population of 1,000 or greater) are highlighted in bold.

== White Drin (Kosovo and Albania) ==
Settlement	Country	Other names	Municipality	Population	Date, Source	Language(s)
**Radac**	**Kosovo**	Radavac	**Peć Municipality**	**1,350**	2011 census	Albanian, Bosnian
Novosellë	Kosovo	Novosella	Peć Municipality			Albanian
Dubovë e Vogël	Kosovo	Dubova e Vogël, Driloni e Vogël, Malo Dubovo	Istog Municipality	346	1981 census	Albanian, Bosnian
Dubovë e Madhë	Kosovo	Dubova e Madhë, Driloni e Madhë	Peć Municipality			Albanian
Ozdrin	Kosovo	Ozrim	Peć Municipality	551	2011 census	Albanian
Stupë	Kosovo	Stupa	Klina Municipality			Albanian
Budisalc	Kosovo		Klina Municipality	398	2011 census	Albanian
Krushevë e Madhe	Kosovo	Krusheva e Madhe	Klina Municipality			Albanian
Zllakuqan	Kosovo		Klina Municipality			Albanian
Jagodë	Kosovo	Jagoda	Klina Municipality	197	2011 census	Albanian
Paskalicë	Kosovo	Paskalica	Klina Municipality			Albanian
Videjë	Kosovo	Videja	Klina Municipality	663	2011 census	Albanian
**Klina**	**Kosovo**	Klinë	Klina Municipality	**38,496**	2011 census	Albanian
Polanë	Kosovo	Polana	Klina Municipality	15	2011 census	Albanian
Deiq	Kosovo		Klina Municipality			Albanian
Përlinë	Kosovo		Klina Municipality			Albanian
**Zajm**	**Kosovo**		Klina Municipality	**1,267**	2011 census	Albanian
Dollovë	Kosovo		Klina Municipality	444	2011 census	Albanian
Rakovinë	Kosovo	Rakovina	Gjakova Municipality	561	2011 census	Albanian
Qifllak	Kosovo	Çifllak, Çifllëk	Gjakova Municipality			Albanian
Meqë	Kosovo	Mece	Gjakova Municipality			Albanian
**Dejnë**	**Kosovo**	Dejna	Gjakova Municipality	**1,757**	2011 census	Albanian
Balldrin	Kosovo	Doblibarë	Gjakova Municipality	902	2011 census	Albanian
Drinas	Kosovo	Ratkoc	Gjakova Municipality			Albanian
Bardhasan	Kosovo		Gjakova Municipality	316	2011 census	Albanian
**Radostë**	**Kosovo**	Radosta	Orahovac Municipality	**2,346**	2011 census	Albanian
Marmull	Kosovo		Gjakova Municipality	641	2011 census	Albanian
Xërxë	Kosovo	Xërxa	Dragash Municipality	236	2011 census	Albanian
Rugova	Kosovo	Rugovë	Dragash Municipality			Albanian
Lukinë	Kosovo	Lukina	Prizren Municipality			Albanian
**Krajk**	**Kosovo**	Krajkë, Krajka	Prizren Municipality	**1,676**	2011 census	Albanian
**Nashec**	**Kosovo**		Prizren Municipality	**1,379**	2011 census	Albanian
Kobajë	Kosovo		Prizren Municipality			Albanian
Dobrushtë	Kosovo	Dobrushta	Prizren Municipality	495	2011 census	Albanian
Stajk	Kosovo		Prizren Municipality			Albanian
Shkoza	Kosovo		Prizren Municipality			Albanian
Vermica	Kosovo		Prizren Municipality			Albanian
Gorozhup	Kosovo		Prizren Municipality			Albanian
Martinaj	Montenegro		plave e guci Municipality			Albanian
Morina	Albania		Kukës Municipality			Albanian
Domaj	Albania		Kukës Municipality			Albanian
Përbreg	Albania		Kukës Municipality			Albanian
**Kukës**	Albania		Kukës Municipality	**16,719**		Albanian

== Black Drin and tributaries (Macedonia and Albania) ==
Settlement	Country	Other names	Municipality	Population	Date, Source	Language(s)
Black Drin
**Struga**	R. Macedonia	Струга, Strugë	Struga Municipality	**16,559**	2002 census	Macedonian, Albanian, Turkish, Aromanian
Moroista	R. Macedonia	Moroishta, Мороишта	Struga Municipality			Macedonian, Albanian
Vranishta	R. Macedonia	Враништа, Vranisht, Vranishtë	Struga Municipality			Macedonian, Albanian
Draslajca	R. Macedonia	Драслајца	Struga Municipality	778	2002 census	Macedonian
Lozhani	R. Macedonia	Ложани	Struga Municipality			Macedonian, Albanian
**Velešta**	R. Macedonia		Struga Municipality	**8,156**	2002 census	Albanian
Dobovjani	R. Macedonia	Dobovjan	Struga Municipality	475	2002 census	Albanian
Tashmarunishta	R. Macedonia	Tashmorunishta, Tashmarunishcha	Struga Municipality	210	2002 census	Macedonian
Globochica	R. Macedonia	Glloboçica, Globochitsa, Глобочица	Struga Municipality	0	2002 census	
Lukovo	R. Macedonia		Struga Municipality	447	2002 census	Macedonian
Dolgash	R. Macedonia		Centar Župa			Turkish, Macedonian, Albanian
Dzhepishte	R. Macedonia		Centar Župa			Turkish, Macedonian, Albanian
Otashani	R. Macedonia	Otishani, Отишани	Centar Župa	530	2002 census	Macedonian, Turkish, Albanian
Osolnica	R. Macedonia	Osollnica, Osolnitsa, Осолница	Centar Župa	0	2002 census	
Pralenik	R. Macedonia		Centar Župa	177	2002 census	Turkish
Mal Papradnik	R. Macedonia	Мал Папрадник	Centar Župa	486	2002 census	Turkish, Macedonian
Golem Papradnik	R. Macedonia	Голем Папрадник	Centar Župa	840	2002 census	Turkish, Macedonian
Vlasiki	R. Macedonia		Centar Župa			Turkish, Macedonian, Albanian
Lake Debar, of Black Drin
Black Drin
Miresh	Albania		Bulqizë Municipality			Albanian, Macedonian
Gollovisht	Albania		Bulqizë Municipality			Albanian
Trnanikj	R. Macedonia		Debar Municipality			Albanian, Macedonian, Turkish
Tërbaç	Albania		Bulqizë Municipality			Albanian
Viçisht	Albania		Bulqizë Municipality			Albanian
Bomovo	R. Macedonia		Debar Municipality			Albanian, Macedonian, Turkish
Gjoricë e Sipërme	Albania	Gjorica e Sipërme	Bulqizë Municipality			Albanian
Selokukji	R. Macedonia		Debar Municipality			Albanian, Macedonian, Turkish
Gjoricë e Poshtme	Albania	Gjorica e Poshmte	Bulqizë Municipality			Albanian
Spas	R. Macedonia		Debar Municipality			Albanian, Macedonian, Turkish
Zalli, of Black Drin
Black Drin
Podgorcë	Albania	Podgorca	Dibër Municipality			Albanian
Okshatinë	Albania	Okshatina	Dibër Municipality			Albanian
**Topojan**	Albania		Dibër Municipality	**1,753**	2011 census	Albanian
Fushë e Vogël	Albania	Fusha e Vogël	Dibër Municipality			Albanian
Kovashicë	Albania	Kovashica	Dibër Municipality			Albanian
Maqellara River, of Black Drin (2)
Kovashicë	Albania	Kovashica	Dibër Municipality			Albanian
Gradec	Albania		Dibër Municipality			Albanian
Fushë e Vogël	Albania	Fushë e Vokël	Dibër Municipality			Albanian
Pesjakë	Albania	Pesjaka	Dibër Municipality			Albanian
Maqellarë	Albania	Maqellara	Dibër Municipality			Albanian
Kërçisht	Albania	Karçisht	Dibër Municipality			Albanian
Pocest	Albania		Dibër Municipality			Albanian
Katund i Vogël	Albania	Katun i Vokël	Dibër Municipality			Albanian
Grazhdan River, of Black Drin (2)
Kovashicë	Albania	Kovashica	Dibër Municipality			Albanian
Gradec	Albania		Dibër Municipality			Albanian
Dovolan	Albania	Доволан	Dibër Municipality			Albanian, Macedonian/Bulgarian
Fushë e Vogël	Albania	Fushë e Vokël	Dibër Municipality			Albanian
Grazhdan	Albania		Dibër Municipality			Albanian
Herebel	Albania		Dibër Municipality			Albanian
Popinarë	Albania		Dibër Municipality			Albanian
Black Drin (1)
Gradec	Albania		Dibër Municipality			Albanian
Herebel River, of Black Drin (2)
Kovashicë	Albania	Kovashica	Dibër Municipality			Albanian
Gradec	Albania		Dibër Municipality			Albanian
Dovolan	Albania	Доволан	Dibër Municipality			Albanian, Macedonian/Bulgarian
Grazhdan	Albania		Dibër Municipality			Albanian
Herebel	Albania		Dibër Municipality			Albanian
Erebarë	Albania		Dibër Municipality			Albanian
Erebara River, of Black Drin (2)
Gradec	Albania		Dibër Municipality			Albanian
Dovolan	Albania	Доволан	Dibër Municipality			Albanian, Macedonian/Bulgarian
Herebel	Albania		Dibër Municipality			Albanian
Erebarë	Albania		Dibër Municipality			Albanian
Black Drin (1)
Dovolan	Albania	Доволан	Dibër Municipality			Albanian, Macedonian/Bulgarian
Gjuras River, of Black Drin (2)
Xhurxhe	Albania		Dibër Municipality			Albanian
Hotesh	Albania		Dibër Municipality			Albanian
Mazhicë	Albania		Bulqizë Municipality			Albanian
Gjuras	Albania		Bulqizë Municipality			Albanian
Black Drin (1)
Xhurxhe	Albania		Dibër Municipality			Albanian
Hotesh	Albania		Dibër Municipality			Albanian
Melan River, of Black Drin (2)
Hotesh	Albania		Dibër Municipality			Albanian
Skuke	Albania		Dibër Municipality			Albanian
Selane	Albania		Dibër Municipality			Albanian
Pejkë	Albania		Dibër Municipality			Albanian
Trenë	Albania		Dibër Municipality			Albanian
Grevë	Albania		Dibër Municipality			Albanian
Melan	Albania		Dibër Municipality			Albanian
Trepçë	Albania		Dibër Municipality			Albanian
Ilnicë	Albania		Dibër Municipality			Albanian
Black Drin (1)
Skuke	Albania		Dibër Municipality			Albanian
Selane	Albania		Dibër Municipality			Albanian
Perroi i Llixhave, of Black Drin (2)
Selane	Albania		Dibër Municipality			Albanian
Çëtushë	Albania	Çatusha	Dibër Municipality			Albanian
**Dohoshisht**	Albania		Dibër Municipality	**~2,000**	2011 census	Albanian
**Peshkopi**	Albania	Peshkopia	Dibër Municipality	**13,251**	2011 census	Albanian
Begjunec	Albania		Dibër Municipality			Albanian
Staravec	Albania		Dibër Municipality			Albanian
Rabdisht	Albania		Dibër Municipality			Albanian
Black Drin (1)
**Luzni**	Albania		Dibër Municipality	**2,433**	2011 census	Albanian
Çëtushë	Albania	Çatusha	Dibër Municipality			Albanian
**Muhurr**	Albania		Dibër Municipality	**2,780**	2011 census	Albanian
Laçes	Albania		Dibër Municipality			Albanian
Arras	Albania		Dibër Municipality			Albanian
Kodër Leshaj	Albania		Dibër Municipality			Albanian
Fushë-Çidhën	Albania		Dibër Municipality			Albanian
Mustafë	Albania		Dibër Municipality			Albanian
Lugje	Albania		Dibër Municipality			Albanian
Zall-Dardhë	Albania		Dibër Municipality			Albanian
Kalis	Albania		Kukës Municipality			Albanian
Bardhaj Reç	Albania		Dibër Municipality			Albanian
Zall-Reç	Albania		Dibër Municipality			Albanian
Draj-Reç	Albania		Dibër Municipality			Albanian
Qafë-Draj	Albania		Kukës Municipality			Albanian
Thark	Albania		Dibër Municipality			Albanian
Skavicë	Albania		Kukës Municipality			Albanian
Ujëmisht	Albania		Kukës Municipality			Albanian
Tejdrin	Albania		Kukës Municipality			Albanian
Gjabricë	Albania		Kukës Municipality			Albanian
Surroj	Albania		Kukës Municipality			Albanian
Bushat	Albania		Kukës Municipality			Albanian
Gostil	Albania		Kukës Municipality			Albanian
Kukës	Albania		Kukës Municipality			Albanian

=== Lake Debar ===
Settlement	Country	Other names	Municipality	Population	Date, Source	Language(s)
Pareshi	R. Macedonia	Paresi, Pareši, Пареши	Centar Župa			Turkish, Macedonian, Albanian
Gorenci, Debarca	R. Macedonia	Горенци, Gorenca	Centar Župa	316	2002 census	Macedonian, Albanian
Dolno Melnicani	R. Macedonia	Долно Мелничани	Centar Župa			Turkish, Macedonian, Albanian
Dolno Kosovrasti	R. Macedonia	Долно Косоврасти, Banishta	Debar Municipality	813	2002 census	Macedonian, Turkish, Albanian
Rajchica	R. Macedonia	Rajçica, Raicki, Рајчица	Debar Municipality			Albanian, Macedonian, Turkish
**Debar**	R. Macedonia	Dibër, Dibra, Debre, Дебар	Debar Municipality	**14,516**	2002 census	Albanian, Turkish, Macedonian

=== Zalli ===
Settlement	Country	Other names	Municipality	Population	Date, Source	Language(s)
Gjoricë e Poshtme	Albania	Gjorica e Poshmte	Bulqizë Municipality			Albanian
Homesh	Albania		Bulqizë Municipality			Albanian
**Shupenzë**	Albania	Shupenza	Bulqizë Municipality	**5,503**	2011 census	Albanian
Gjoricë e Sipërme	Albania	Gjorica e Sipërme	Bulqizë Municipality			Albanian
Vlashaj	Albania		Bulqizë Municipality			Albanian
Çerenec i Poshtëm	Albania		Bulqizë Municipality			Albanian
Moglica River, of Zalli (3)
Çerenec i Poshtëm	Albania		Bulqizë Municipality			Albanian
Çerenec i Sipërme	Albania		Bulqizë Municipality			Albanian
Strikçan	Albania		Bulqizë Municipality			Albanian
Kosoveci	Albania		Bulqizë Municipality			Albanian
Lubalesh	Albania		Bulqizë Municipality			Albanian
Smollik	Albania		Bulqizë Municipality			Albanian
Kojavec	Albania		Bulqizë Municipality			Albanian
Lejçan	Albania		Bulqizë Municipality			Albanian
Stokaj	Albania		Bulqizë Municipality			Albanian
Cenaj	Albania		Bulqizë Municipality			Albanian
Okshtuni i Madh	Albania		Bulqizë Municipality			Albanian
Moglicë	Albania		Bulqizë Municipality			Albanian
Borova River, of Moglica River (4)
Okshtuni i Madh	Albania		Bulqizë Municipality			Albanian
Sebisht	Albania		Bulqizë Municipality			Albanian
Borovë	Albania		Bulqizë Municipality			Albanian
Moglica River, of Zalli (3)
Lilaj	Albania		Bulqizë Municipality			Albanian
Zalli, of Black Drin (2)
Sofraçan	Albania		Bulqizë Municipality			Albanian
Sopot	Albania		Bulqizë Municipality			Albanian
Krajkë	Albania		Bulqizë Municipality			Albanian
Zerqan	Albania		Bulqizë Municipality			Albanian
Peladhi	Albania		Bulqizë Municipality			Albanian
Valikardhë	Albania		Bulqizë Municipality			Albanian
Fushë-Bulqizë	Albania		Bulqizë Municipality			Albanian
Vajkal	Albania		Bulqizë Municipality			Albanian
Qyteti i Ri	Albania		Bulqizë Municipality			Albanian
Bulqizë	Albania		Bulqizë Municipality			Albanian
