= Olga Greceanu =

Romanian artist and writer (1890–1978)

- Born: Olga Șeșevski; 17 August 1890; Mânăstirea Nămăiești, Argeș County, Romania
- Died: 16 November 1978 (aged 88); Bucharest, Romania
- Known for: Murals, mosiacs and religious writing
- Movement: Neo-Byzantine
- Spouse: Nicolae Greceanu

Olga Greceanu (1890–1978) was a Romanian writer and painter, particularly known for her neo-Byzantine church frescoes and mosaics and her writings on religious topics.

== Early life and education ==
Greceanu was born as Olga Șeșevski into an aristocratic family of Bucharest intellectuals with Polish-German origins, on 17 August 1890, in the village of Mânăstirea Nămăiești near Câmpulung in Argeș County, Romania. She attended primary and high schools at private institutions in Bucharest. After completing these, she studied both chemistry and fine arts, first in Bucharest and then in Liège, Belgium from 1911 to 1914, when the outbreak of World War I forced her to return to Romania. There, in 1914, she married her former classmate, Nicolae Greceanu, who was an engineer and came from a well-known noble family.

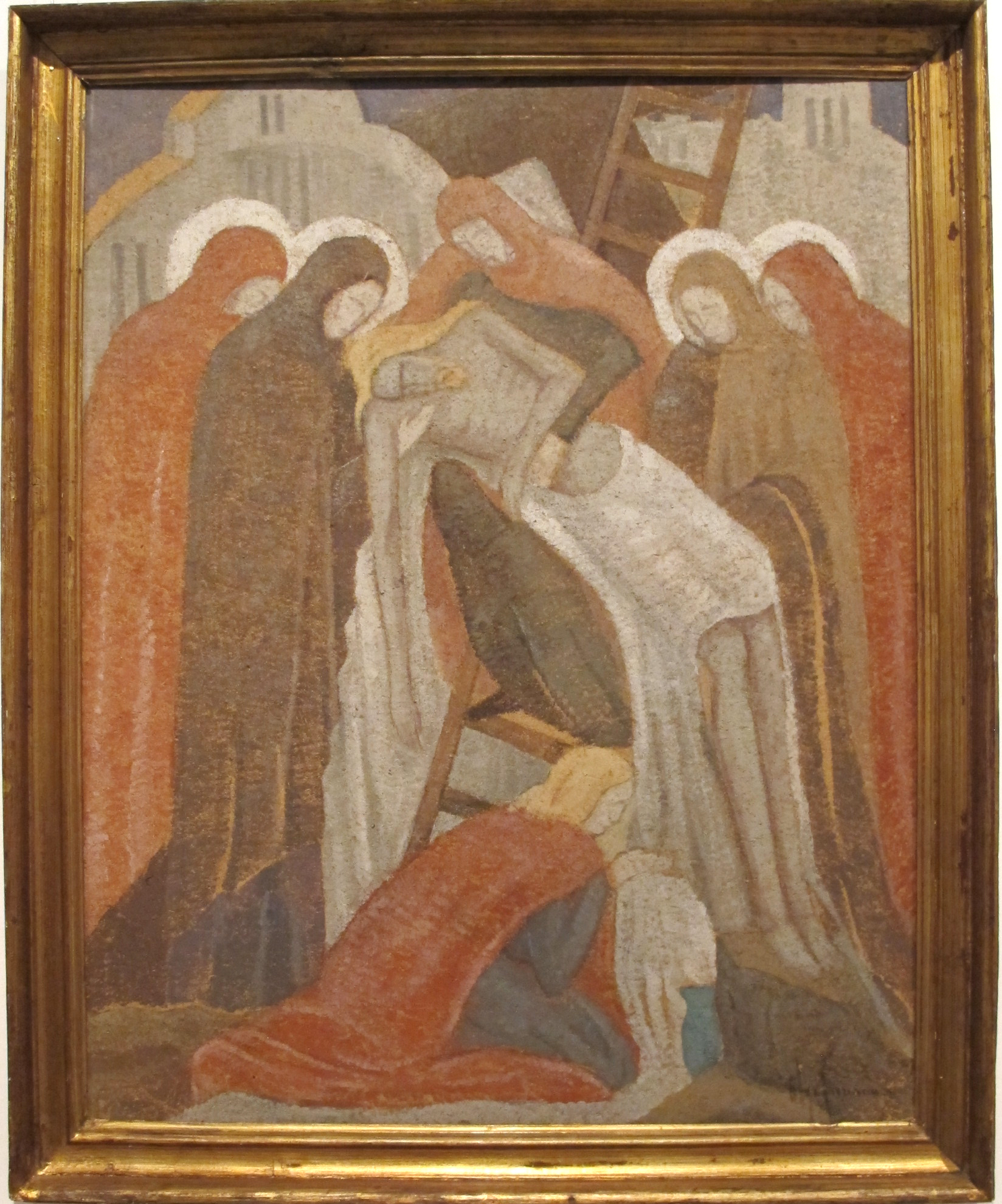
Olga Greceanu, Deposition from the Cross, (1925–30)

== Career ==
Greceanu initiated the first association of women painters and sculptors in Romania in 1914 and, in 1915, organized their first exhibition at the Romanian Athenaeum in Bucharest. She held another group exhibition in Iași in what is now Moldova and a solo exhibition at the Romanian Athenaeum in 1919. Between 1919 and 1922, she returned to Belgium to complete her studies. She then studied fresco painting in Paris, also visiting Italy and other countries. She also organised the Fine Arts Union of Romania in 1921. Along with Cecilia Cuțescu-Storck, she became the best-known woman painter in the interwar period in the country. She had solo exhibitions in New York in 1924 and Paris in 1928, as well as in galleries in Romania. She was among those to exhibit in Les femmes artistes d'Europe, the first international all-woman art show in France, held at the Jeu de Paume in Paris in early 1937. She also participated in the 1939 New York World's Fair. Before World War II she painted avant-garde frescoes in the two halls of the Palace of the Holy Synod in Bucharest, and in the Museum Hall at the Royal Palace of Bucharest. She also worked on frescoes and mosaics in the Ion Mincu University of Architecture and Urban Planning, the Salon of the Mogoșoaia Station and on exterior frescoes at the Nicolae Iorga Institute of History, all in Bucharest.

Following the USSR invasion of Romania in 1944, partial attempts were made to erase Greceanu from Romanian history. In the writings on Romanian art during the last half of the 20th century, she was either ignored or mentioned only in passing. Her paintings in public institutions were covered with lime, and in her home in Bălteni, Dâmbovița County the frescoed walls were torn down. However, she was allowed to work on restoring and painting several Orthodox churches, including in Bălteni (1945 and 1971), the Pitar Moș Church in Bucharest, the Darvari Skete in Bucharest (1967), and the Sapienței Church in Bucharest (1968). Together with Sofian Boghiu, she also worked on external mosaics at the Antim Monastery in Bucharest.

== Religious activities ==
Greceanu was a member of the "Burning Prayer of the Mother of God", which consisted of a nucleus of lay intellectuals and monks who aimed to preserve Orthodox Christian values during what it saw as communist atheism following the USSR takeover. The group was established in 1946 and banned by the government in 1948, although members continued to meet informally at their homes. As restrictions on religion were gradually eased, she was allowed to speak in churches on Sundays, with the blessing of the Patriarch, something extremely rare among laypeople, especially women.

== Publications ==
In addition to her artistic endeavours, Greceanu published several books on art history and Christian-Orthodox themes. Her biblical dictionary, which was completed in 1963 but not published until 2011, has over 1400 articles and is decorated with 500 pencil drawings.

- 1933 — Bucarest et ses environs (in French)
- 1935 — Mural Composition – Its Laws and Techniques, Triumful Graphic Arts Institute, Bucharest (translated into French in 1938)
- 1937 — Culă din Măldărești (The Culă from Măldărești), Triumful Graphic Arts Institute, Bucharest.
- 1939 — The National Specificity in Painting, Tiparul Cartea Românească, Bucharest.
- 1940 — In Your Footsteps, Jesus
- 1943 — Femmes peintres d'autrefois (Women painters of yesteryear), Ziarul Publishing House, Craiova
- 2011 — Testimony in Word and Image. Vocabulary of Faith and Spiritual Life, published posthumously.

== Death ==
Greceanu died on 16 November 1978 in Bucharest, after having spent the day restoring at the Darvari Skete. She was buried at the Bellu Cemetery.
