= Strikçan Roman burial =

Albanian archaeological site

- Interactive map of Strikçan Roman burial
- 41°29′19″N 20°24′27″E
- Type: Roman tomb
- Periods: Roman Empire
- Cultures: Roman
- Associated with: Jupiter; Gellianos
- Location: Strikçan, Bulqizë
- Region: Dibër, Albania

History
- Built: c. 3rd–4th century AD

Site notes
- Excavation dates: August–September 2025
- Archaeologists: Erikson Nikolli (Lead); Albanological Studies

The Strikçan Roman burial is a Roman tomb in Strikçan, Bulqizë, Dibër, Albania. The excavation was carried out between August and September 2025 by the Academy of Albanological Studies, and planned by Erikson Nikolli. The burial is estimated to have been buried occurred between the 3rd and 4th centuries during the Roman imperial period. There is a rare bilingual inscription which archaeologists believed was written in both Greek and Latin, dedicated both to the Roman god Jupiter and to Gellianos, the deceased.

== Excavation ==
In August 2025, a large Roman tomb was found in Strikçan in Dibër County, Albania, on a plateau near the border with North Macedonia. It is the first Roman-era monumental tomb to have been discovered in Albania. The excavation was planned and led by Erikson Nikolli and lasted for a month. Archaeologists were first alerted by local people who had noticed a dug-up stone block, and who quickly reported it to the Academy of Albanological Studies.

It appears that the tomb has been looted at least twice; once in ancient times and more recently when heavy machinery was used to move a large stone on top of the tomb.

== Construction ==
The tomb measures 9 m × 6 m (30 ft × 20 ft), and was constructed out of large carved limestone slabs. It features a monumental staircase leading down to an antechamber and the main burial chamber itself. Both the scale of the tomb, and its construction quality suggest it was built to hold the body of a high-status person.

== Artefacts ==
An inscription found in this Roman tomb was written in Greek and Latin and dedicated the tomb to Jupiter, and to a Roman individual named Gellianos who it is believed was buried in the tomb. This inscription, blending both Greek language and Roman religion provided evidence of cultural hybridity.

Other artefacts that were found in this Roman tomb include glass plates and knives, and fragments of gold-threaded textiles, often used in garments worn by the elite, and indicating high social standing in the Roman period.
