= Tower of Kurt Pasha =

Tower house in Vratsa, Bulgaria

Coordinates: 43°12′3″N 23°32′51″E

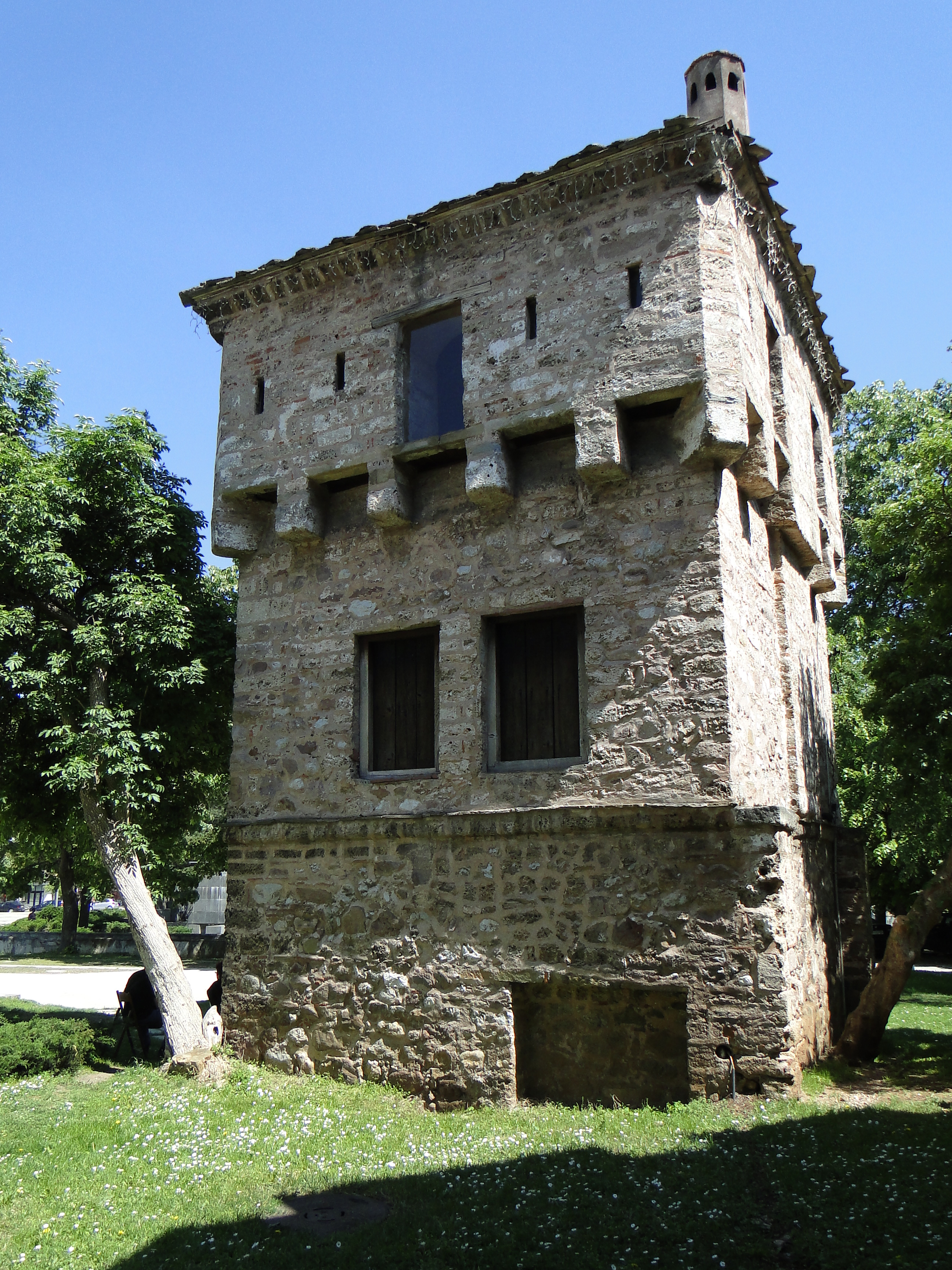
The 17th-century Tower of Kurt Pasha in Vratsa, Bulgaria

The Tower of Kurt Pasha (Bulgarian: Куртпашова кула, Kurtpashova kula), also rendered as Kurt Pasha Tower or Kurtpashov(a) Tower, is an Ottoman-era tower house in the town of Vratsa in northwest Bulgaria. Built in the 17th century, nowadays it is used as an exhibition space and souvenir shop adjacent to the Vratsa Regional Historical Museum.

Like other tower houses in the Balkans from that age, the Tower of Kurt Pasha belongs to a specific type of habitable defensive tower which emerged in parts of the Balkans during a turbulent and anarchic period in the Ottoman Empire in the 17th century. The Tower of Kurt Pasha was constructed by a local feudal lord of the period as a fortified abode for his family, collectively known as Kurtpashovtsi. A legend claims that the family stems from medieval Bulgarian nobility and, having converted to Islam under Ottoman rule, preserved its holdings in the region.

The tower has a square foundation of 6 by 6 m (20 by 20 ft) and reaches 11 m (36 ft) in height. It has a total of four stories, including the basement and ground level. The two top stories were occupied by the family of the owner. The construction of the tower employs trimmer joists, mortar and stone to separate the top floor from the one below, preventing potential fires. The top floor features twelve arrow slits as well as openings designed for pouring boiling liquids over potential enemies. These openings were positioned between the corbels. Although it is smaller in size and more modern than the nearby Tower of the Meshchii, the Tower of Kurt Pasha has the appearance of a small medieval fortress, due to its lack of windows and characteristic shape.

In late 2011, the Tower of Kurt Pasha underwent minor conservation works worth 10,000 Bulgarian leva. Currently, the tower houses a souvenir shop on the first floor as well as exhibition space for exhibits of the Vratsa Regional Historical Museum. From early 2012 to mid-2013, the tower had been visited by a total of 40,000 people.
