= Darvari Skete =

Romanian Orthodox skete

Coordinates: 44°26′35″N 26°06′25″E

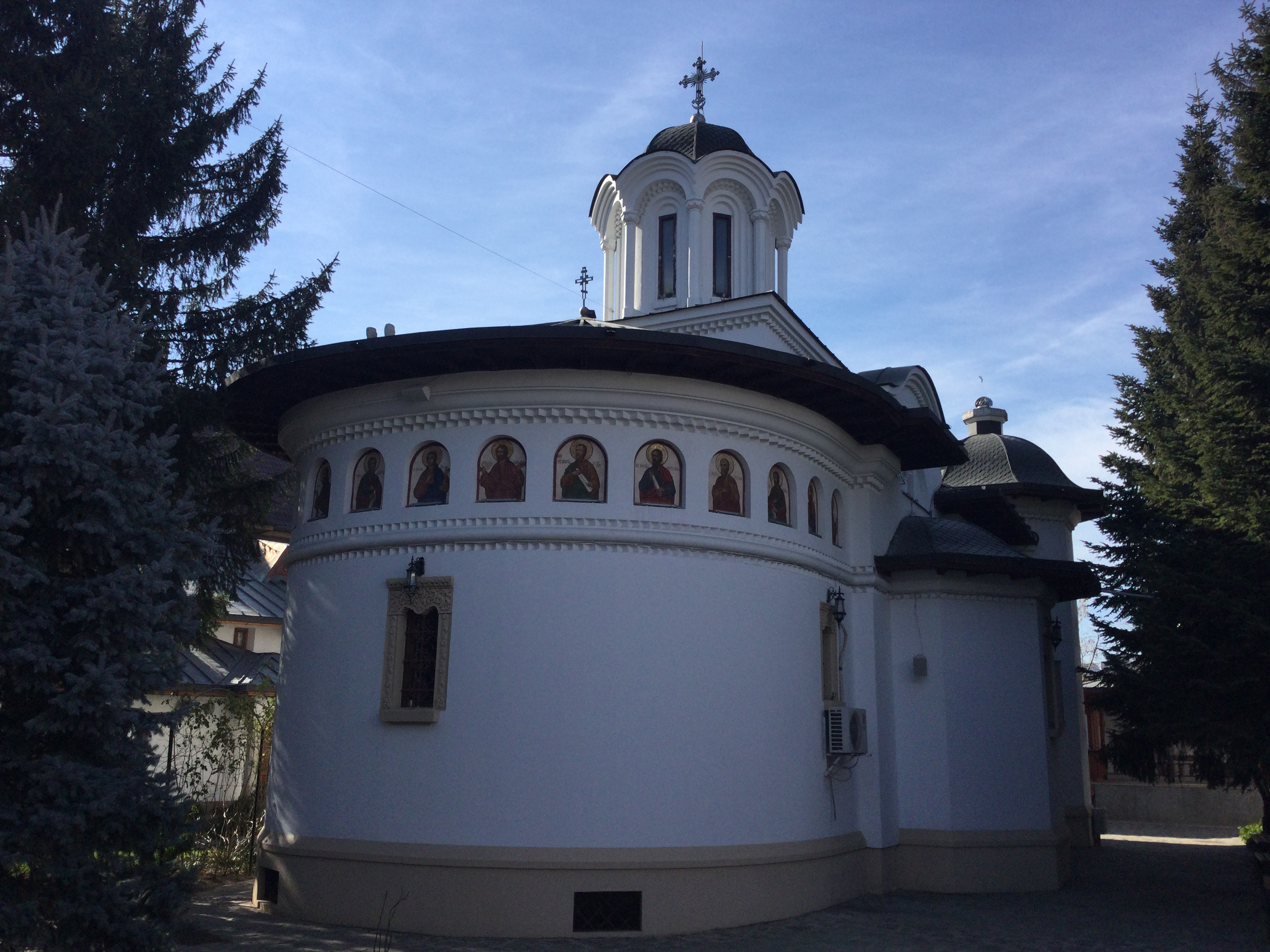
Darvari Skete Church

The Darvari Skete (Romanian: Schitul Darvari) is a Romanian Orthodox skete located at 3 Schitul Darvari Street, Bucharest, Romania. It is dedicated to the Archangels Michael and Gabriel.

In 1834, căminar (tavern tax collector) Mihalache Darvari built a small church with no dome behind the Icoanei Church. Surrounded by monastic cells and walls, it served as a family chapel. Nuns from Pasărea and Samurcășești monasteries were brought in the following year. They remained until 1864, when domnitor Alexandru Ioan Cuza ordered them outside the city, and services were subsequently held by married priests. In 1869, monks passing through from Prodromos visited, officiating like on Mount Athos and attracting many visitors. A few stayed behind. In 1894, administrator Nicolae Darvari repaired the ruined skete, adding a small dome to the church.

The old church was entirely demolished in 1933-1934 and replaced by the current structure. Architect Gheorghe Simotta employed an Oltenian-Muntenian style, while the entire interior was painted in Athonite fresco by Iosif Keber. In 1959, the communist regime sent the monks to the monasteries at Cernica Monastery and Bucium, and Darvari became a subsidiary of Icoanei. The complex was declared a historic monument in 1992, and reopened as a monastic establishment in 1996, with eight young monks.

The small cross-shaped church measures 19 x 8 meters, with an octagonal dome that sits on a square base above the nave. The porch has been closed since the original construction. Ktetor Darvari is buried on the west end of the interior. Small silver boxes display relics of several saints, including John Chrysostom, Charalambos, Ignatius of Antioch, Eleftherios, Gerasimus of the Jordan and Ambrose. The monastic cells, chapel and refectory were completed in 2001.
