= Tower houses in the Balkans =

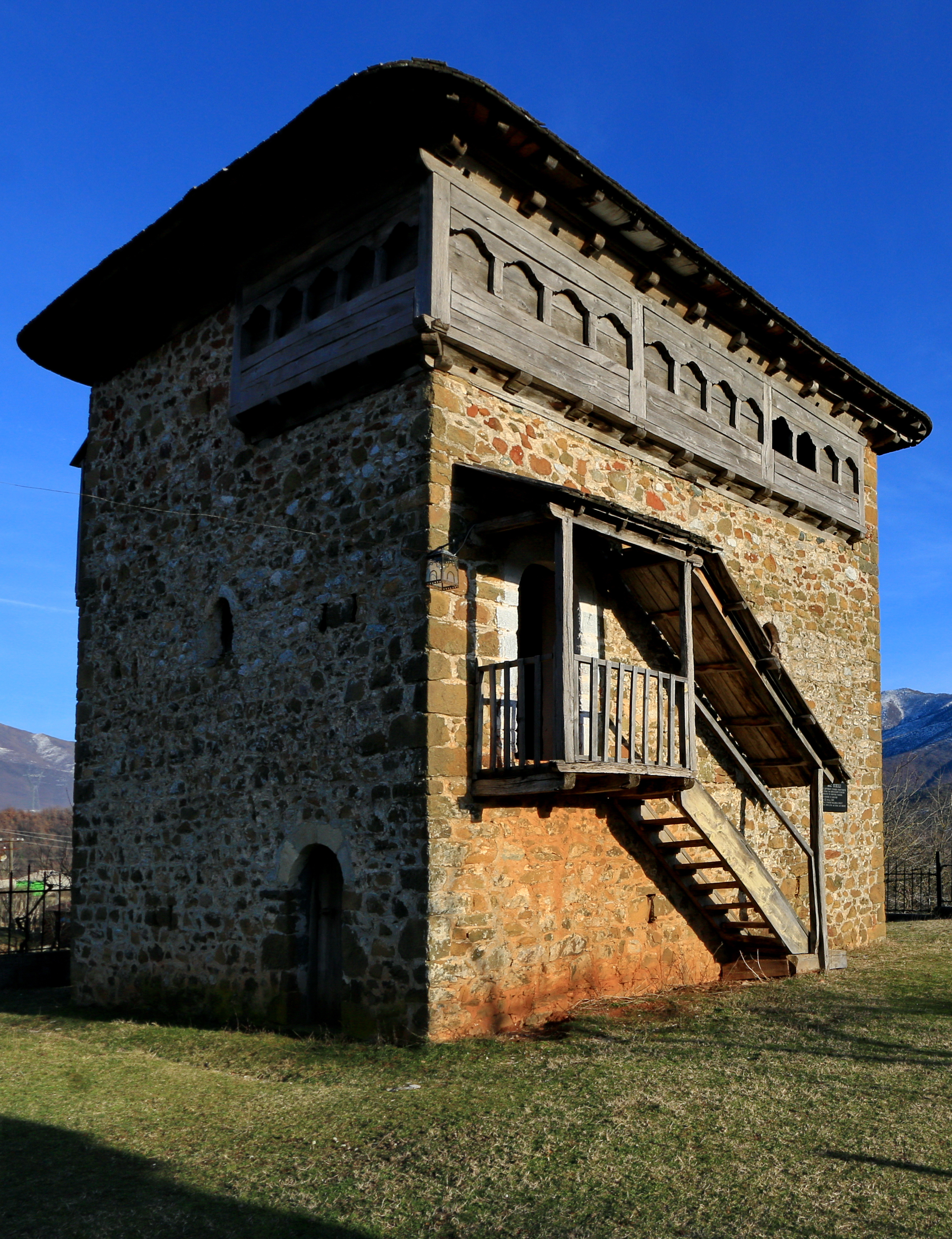
Mic Sokoli tower house in Bujan, northern Albania.

Tower houses (singular: Albanian: kullë; Bosnian: odžak Bulgarian: кули, kuli; Serbian: кула, Romanian: culă) developed and were built since the Middle Ages in the Balkans, particularly in Albania, Kosovo and Montenegro, but also in Bosnia and Herzegovina, Bulgaria, Greece, North Macedonia, Serbia, and Romania (Oltenia and to a lesser degree Muntenia).

Originating from the Mediterranean medieval stone tower houses, they were developed by Albanian carpenter-mason craftsmanship, which had a strong reputation within the Ottoman as well as the European elites for the construction of advanced residential housing. Mid-19th century studies pointed out that all the men – almost without exception – who build walls, fell trees and saw lumber in the European part of the Ottoman Empire and in the Kingdom of Greece, were from Albania, specifically from mountainous regions. For metal work Balkan Egyptians were contracted, and specific fortification features were sometimes left to stone mason specialists from the Adriatic coast.

The practice became very widespread among both Christian and Muslim communities during the decline of Ottoman power in the 17th century and flourished until the early 20th century. The tower houses were typically made out of stone, rose three or four storeys, and were square or rectangular in shape. They served both military (defence, watchtower) and civilian (residential) purposes in order to protect the extended family.

== Names ==
Tower houses are called in Albanian: kullë, Bosnian: odžak, Bulgarian: кули, kuli, Serbian: кула, Romanian: culă, all meaning "tower", from Arabic قَلْعَة (qalʿa, “fort, fortress”) via Persian qulla, meaning "mountain" or "top", and Turkish kule.

== In Albania ==
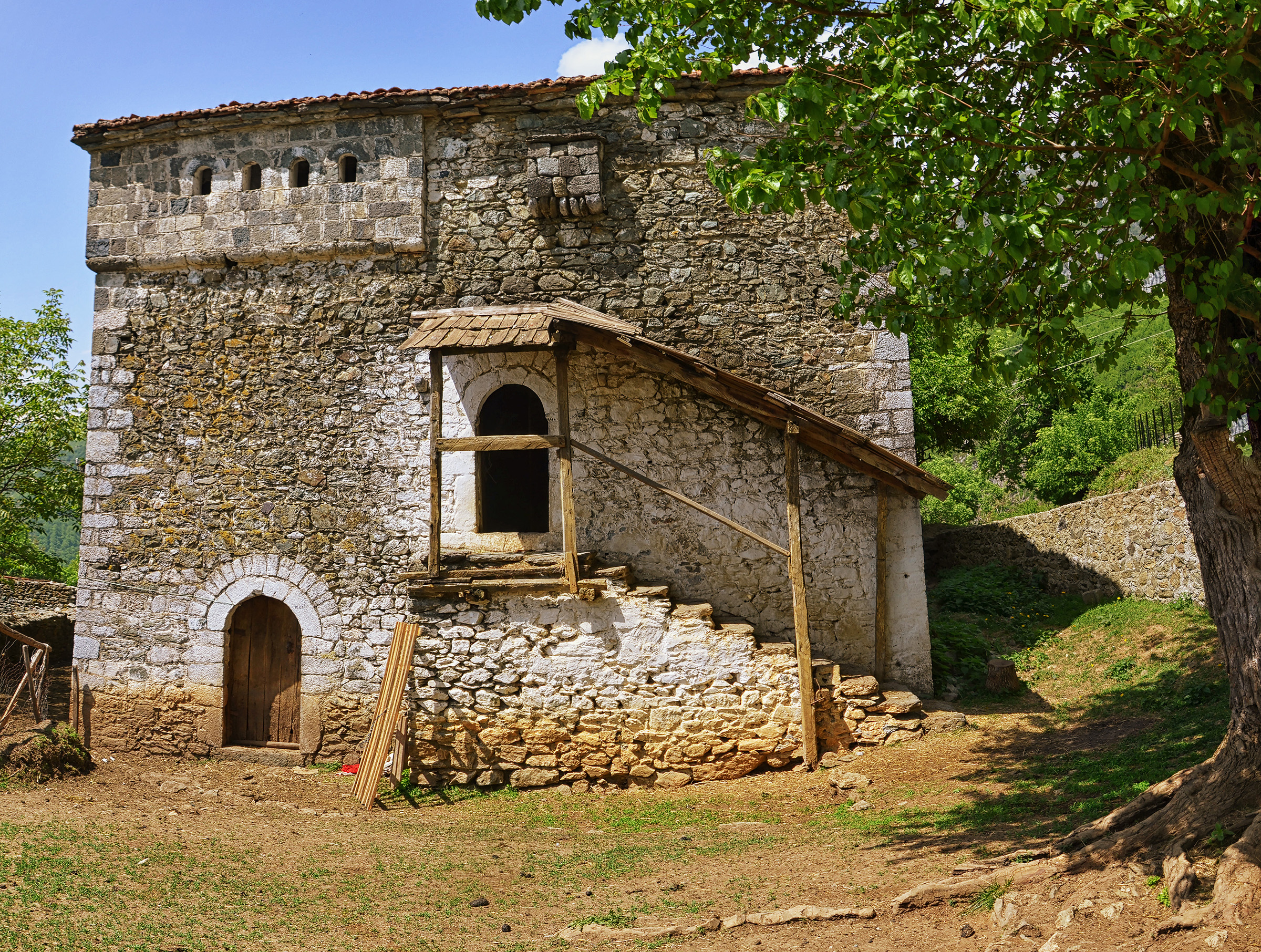
Tower house in Tropoje, northern Albania

Types of tower houses in Albanian architecture existed before the Ottoman invasion of the Balkans, especially in Gjirokastër. Albanian kullë are predominantly found in the north of the country, with notable instances in the south being Berat, Gjirokastër, Himara, and Këlcyrë. Kullas are heavily fortified buildings with small windows and shooting holes, because their main purpose was to offer security in a fighting situation. The first kullas that were built are from the 17th century, a time when there was continuous fighting in the Dukagjini region, although most of the ones that still remain are from the 18th or 19th century. They are almost always built within a complex of buildings with various functions, but kullas in towns exist mostly as standalone structures. They are also positioned within the complex of buildings that they exist in a way that makes it possible for the inhabitants to survey the surrounding area. Kullas in towns are usually built as standalone structures, while in villages they are more commonly found as a part of a larger ensemble of kullas and stone houses, usually grouped based on the family clan they belonged to.

Certain kullë were used as places of isolation and safe havens, or "locked towers" (Albanian: kulla ngujimi), intended for the use of persons targeted by blood feuds (gjakmarrja). An example can be found in Theth, northern Albania.

There are also instances of fortified tower houses in Gjirokastër built in the 13th century, pre-dating Ottoman conquest.

== In Kosovo ==
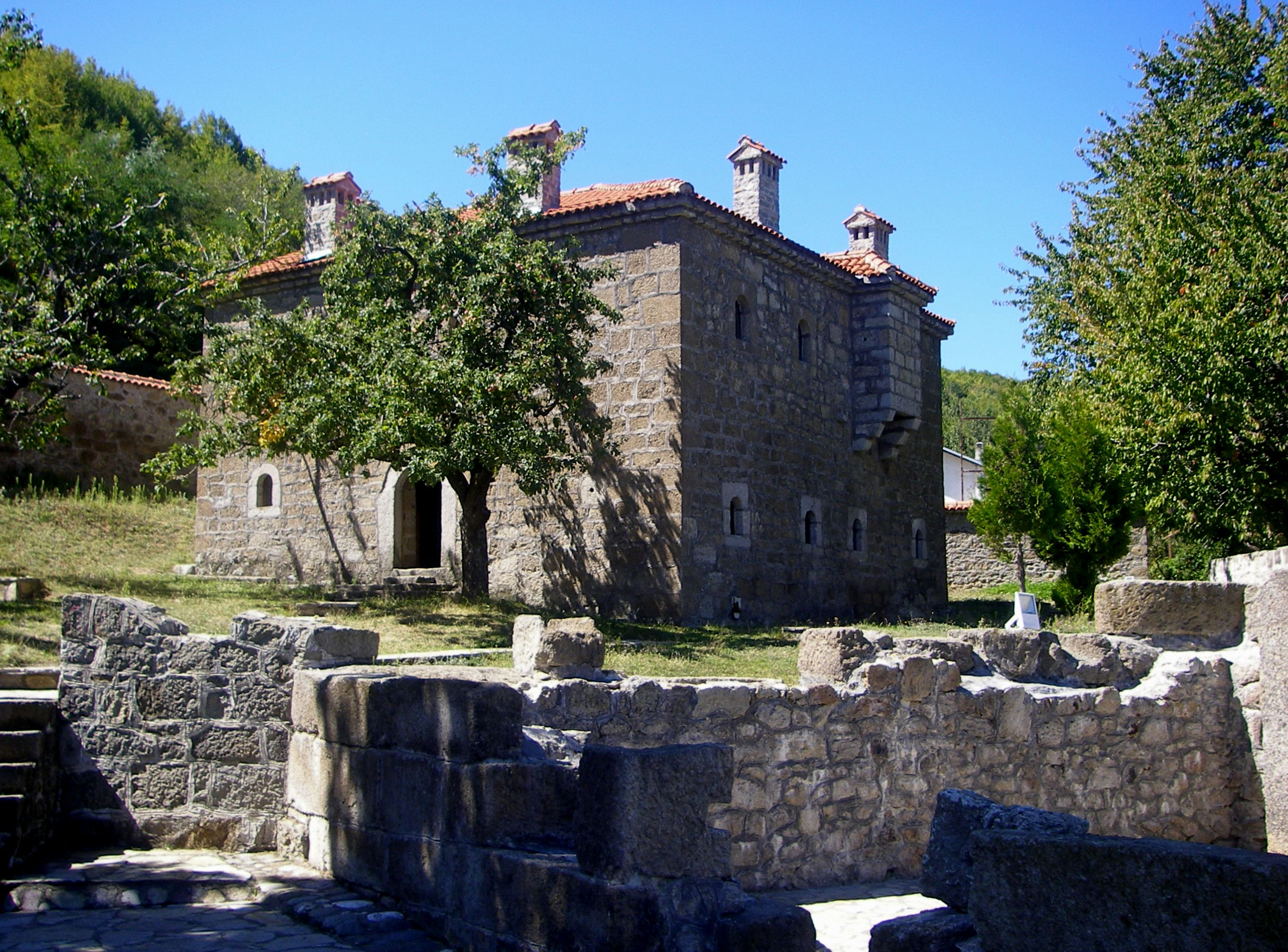
Kulla of Isa Boletini in Kosovo

In Kosovo, traditional two-or three-story kullas were primarily built between the 18th and early 20th centuries. These fortified stone houses served as both dwellings and defensive structures, reflecting the socio-political conditions of the time. They were typically constructed using locally sourced stone, with some incorporating decorative wooden elements on the upper floors. The ground floor was generally used for storage and livestock, while the upper floors housed living quarters and guest reception areas.

Historically, kullas were inhabited solely by men, while women and children lived in an adjoining çardak (annex). This arrangement was influenced by cultural and religious traditions, particularly those emphasizing gender segregation in social spaces. The kulla's characteristic double entrances and staircases reflected this separation, as only the side entrance and staircase provided access to private family quarters.

The exterior walls of a kulla could be up to one meter thick at ground level, gradually thinning toward the roof. Small, narrow openings, known as frëngji, were incorporated into the walls. These openings served a dual purpose: they allowed for limited natural light and ventilation while acting as defensive loopholes from which inhabitants could repel attacks. The fortress-like design of kullas was a response to the frequent conflicts and blood feuds (gjakmarrja) that characterized life in the Balkans during the Ottoman period.

Apart from their defensive function, kullas were designed to withstand the region’s climate. Their thick stone walls provided insulation, keeping the interiors cool in summer and warm in winter. This natural climate regulation made them well-suited to Kosovo’s continental climate, where summers can be hot and winters cold.

Several historic kullas remain standing today, serving as cultural heritage monuments. Notable examples in Kosovo include:

- Zahir Pajaziti's Tower (Albanian: Kulla e Zahir Pajazitit) – the kulla of the first KLA commander, located in Podujevë
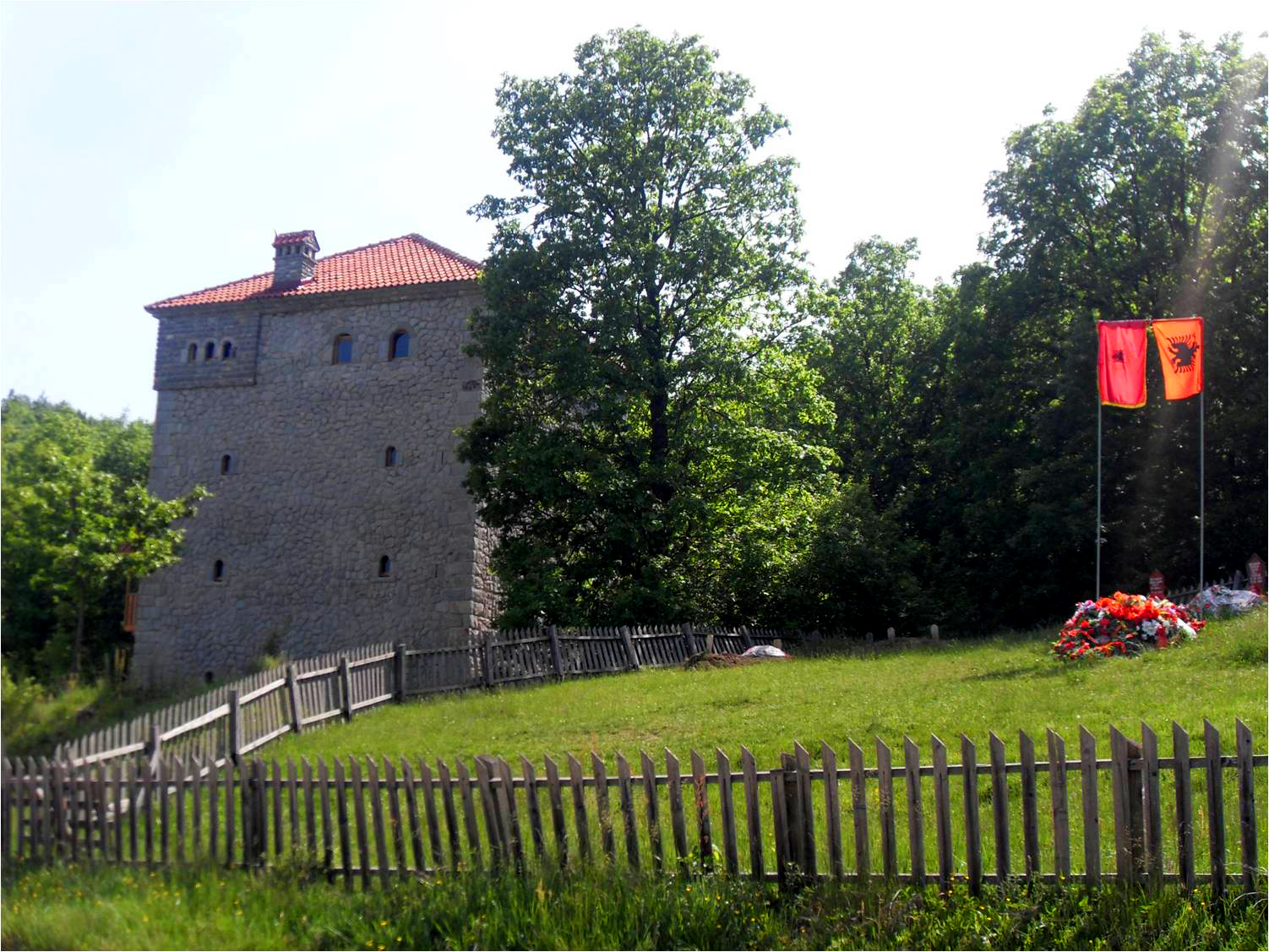
  The Kulla of Zahir Pajaziti located in the village of Orllan, Podujevë
- Jashar Pasha’s Tower (Kulla e Jashar Pashës) – located in Gjakova, this kulla is one of the best-preserved examples of its kind.
- Haxhi Zeka’s Tower (Kulla e Haxhi Zekës) – situated in Peja, it belonged to Haxhi Zeka, a prominent nationalist and political figure.
- Xhafer Syla’s Tower (Kulla e Xhafer Sylës) – an example of a well-maintained kulla in the Dukagjini region.
- Mazrekaj Tower (Kulla e Mazrekajve) – located in Junik, showcasing traditional kulla architecture.
- Janjevo Tower (Kulla e Janjevës) – representing an adaptation of kulla design in central Kosovo.
- Tomić’s Tower (Kulla e Tomiçit) – an example of a Serb-owned kulla in Kosovo, highlighting the architectural influence across communities.
- Osdautaj’s Tower (Kulla e Osdautajve) – located in Isniq, known for its well-preserved Ottoman-era structure.

Despite their cultural and historical importance, many kullas in Kosovo have been neglected or damaged due to war and lack of preservation efforts. While some have been restored and repurposed as museums or cultural heritage sites, others remain at risk of deterioration. Preservation initiatives by organizations such as the Ministry of Culture, Youth, and Sports of Kosovo, as well as international projects like Ilucidare, aim to document and protect these unique structures.

== In Bosnia and Herzegovina ==
Towers and odžaks are usually built next to each other as fortification and residential buildings. Although easily confused they differ in material and purpose. However, sometime one building can be both at once. There used to be over three hundred such facilities in the territory of Bosnia and Herzegovina, and today there are over forty villages and hamlets named Kula and twelve Kulina, thirty-one settlements are called Odžak, four Odžaci and one Odžačina. A number of these towers and odžaks have been declared a national monument of Bosnia and Herzegovina.

Local feudal lords of the Ottoman era built these stone multi-storey towers on their estates with a defensive and housing purpose. The city fortification and housing architecture often served as a model, with loopholes adopted from the city ramparts, and sanitary and other elements from the town houses were included. The tower is multi-story building with the base usually a square between 6 and 10 meters, less often a rectangle, and the height is between 11 and 20, and in some cases up to 25 meters. They were built from limestone, covered with a tented roof made of wood shingle or limestone slabs. The walls near the ground floor are always slightly thicker than the walls on the upper floors, varying between 100 and 152 cm. Odžaks were built next to the towers as regular one or two-story residential buildings with a rectangular base. They were built of stone, adobe and wood. There is always a spacious courtyard surrounded by a wall with the arched gate, protecting courtyard, towers and odžaks. There are also other buildings in the yard, including water well or water well pump. A particular type of tower is the captain's tower. They were built in the same way as those of landlords, but below these towers there were often dungeons.

== In Bulgaria ==
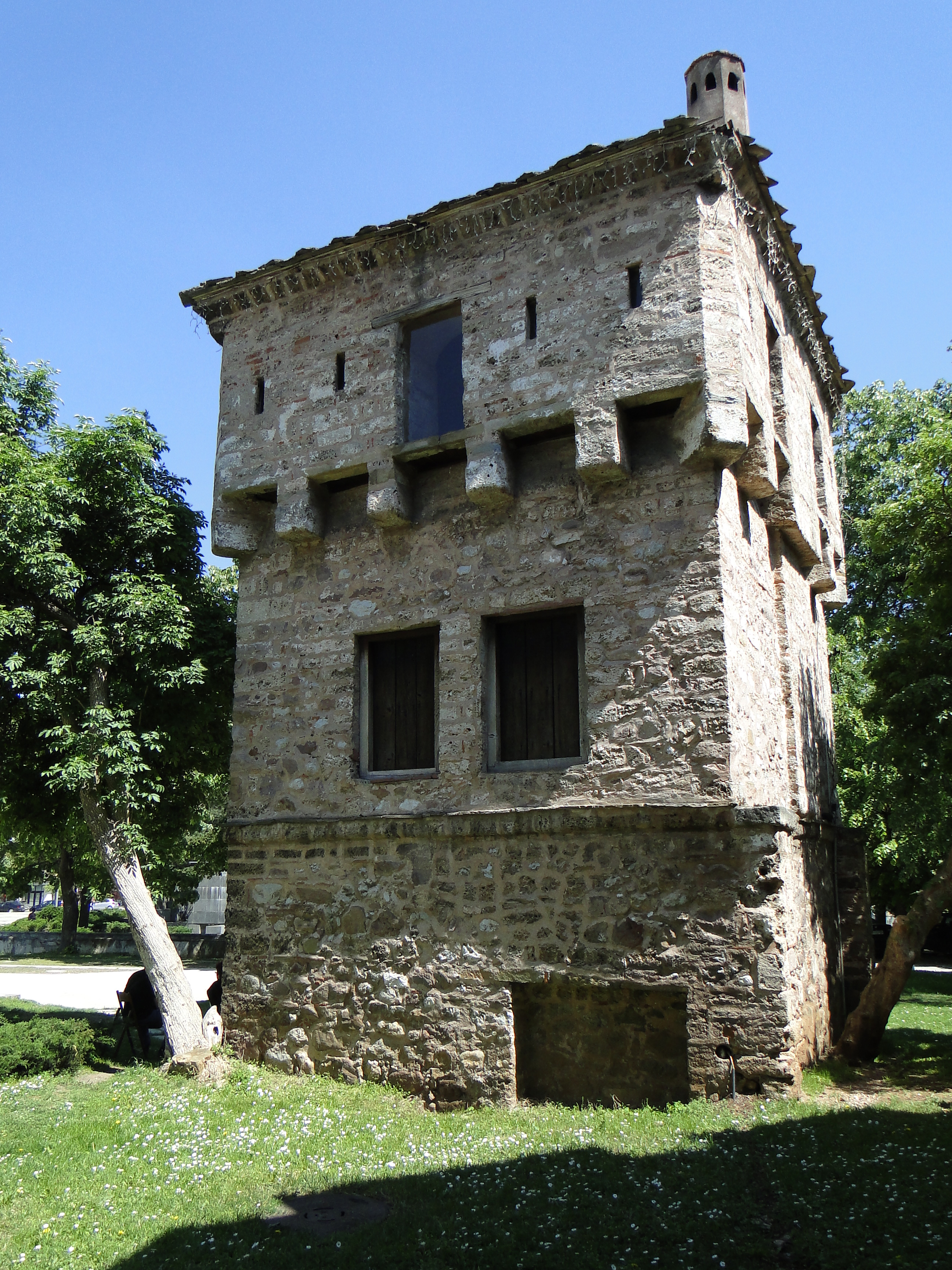
Kurtpashov Tower in Vratsa, Bulgaria

Examples of fortified residential towers in Bulgarian lands include the 16th-century Tower of the Meshchii (converted into a clock tower in the 19th century) and the 17th-century Kurtpashov Tower in Vratsa in Bulgaria's northwest. The Pirgova (Pirkova) Tower, similar in purpose but different in design, was built in the southwestern town of Kyustendil in the 14th or 15th century.

The tower in Teshovo in south Pirin, noted for its relatively sophisticated water conduit and sewage system, is also thought to date to the early Ottoman rule of Bulgaria and may well have been the residence of a local bey.

The Tower of Hrelyo, built in 1334–5 by prōtosebastos Hrelja in the courtyard of the Rila Monastery, is a pre-Ottoman example of an autonomous tower that served residential as well as defensive purposes. Besides featuring habitable floors, the 75 feet (23 m) Hrelyo's Tower also includes an Orthodox chapel on its top floor.

== In Greece ==
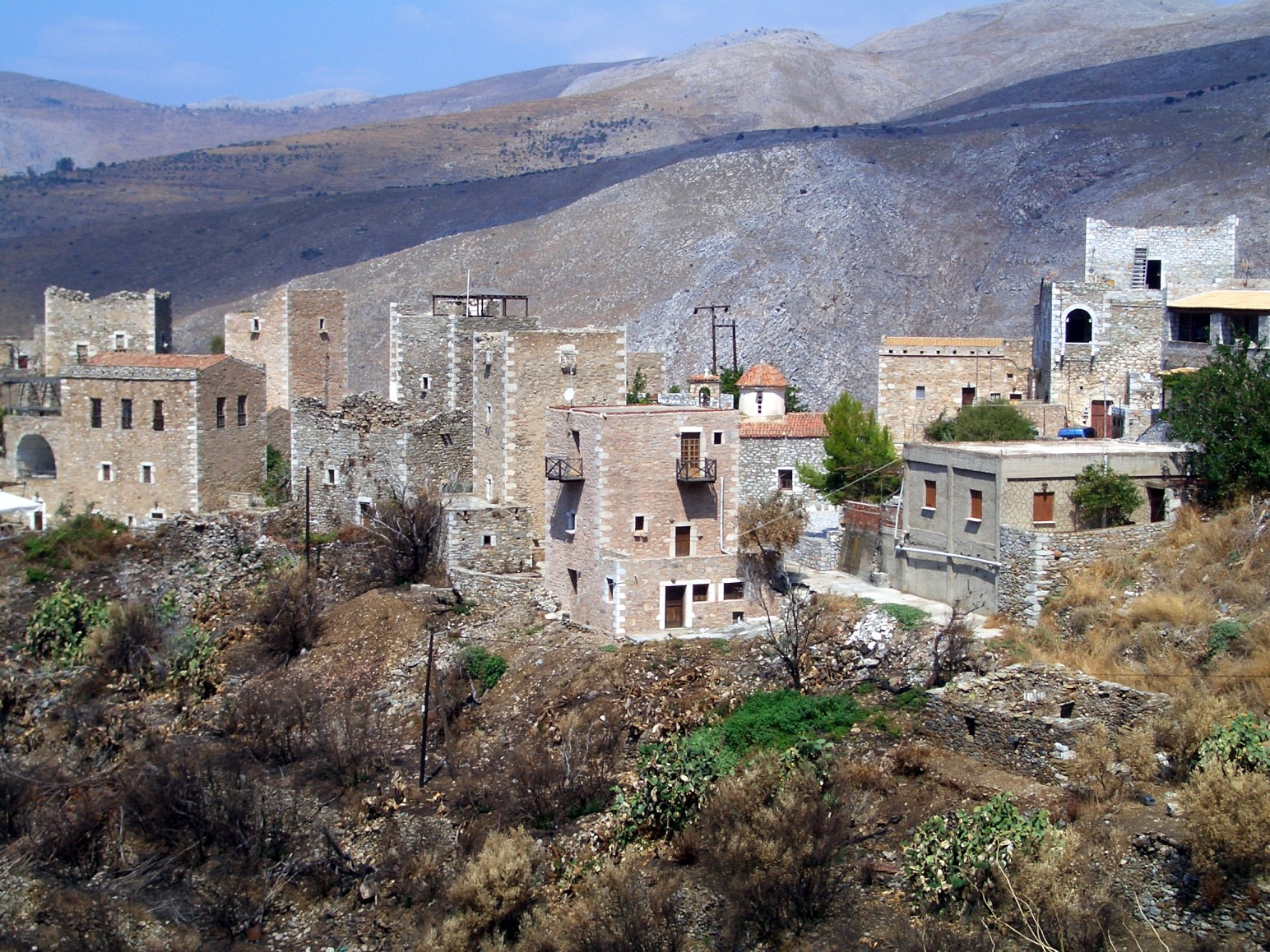
Tower houses in Vatheia, Mani peninsula

The tradition of tower houses in Greek architecture existed since the Byzantine era and into Venetian and French rule beginning in 1204 (see Frankokratia).

Although the Ottoman-period architecture has almost completely disappeared from Greek urban centres, there are scattered examples of tower houses built in Ottoman Greece and during the chifliks.

Alongside the fortified houses of Mani (called xemonia or pyrgospita), there are also residential towers (koule) of Ottoman origin. The tower houses of Mani continue to attract tourists and visitors; some have been adapted for use as guest cottages.

== In Serbia ==
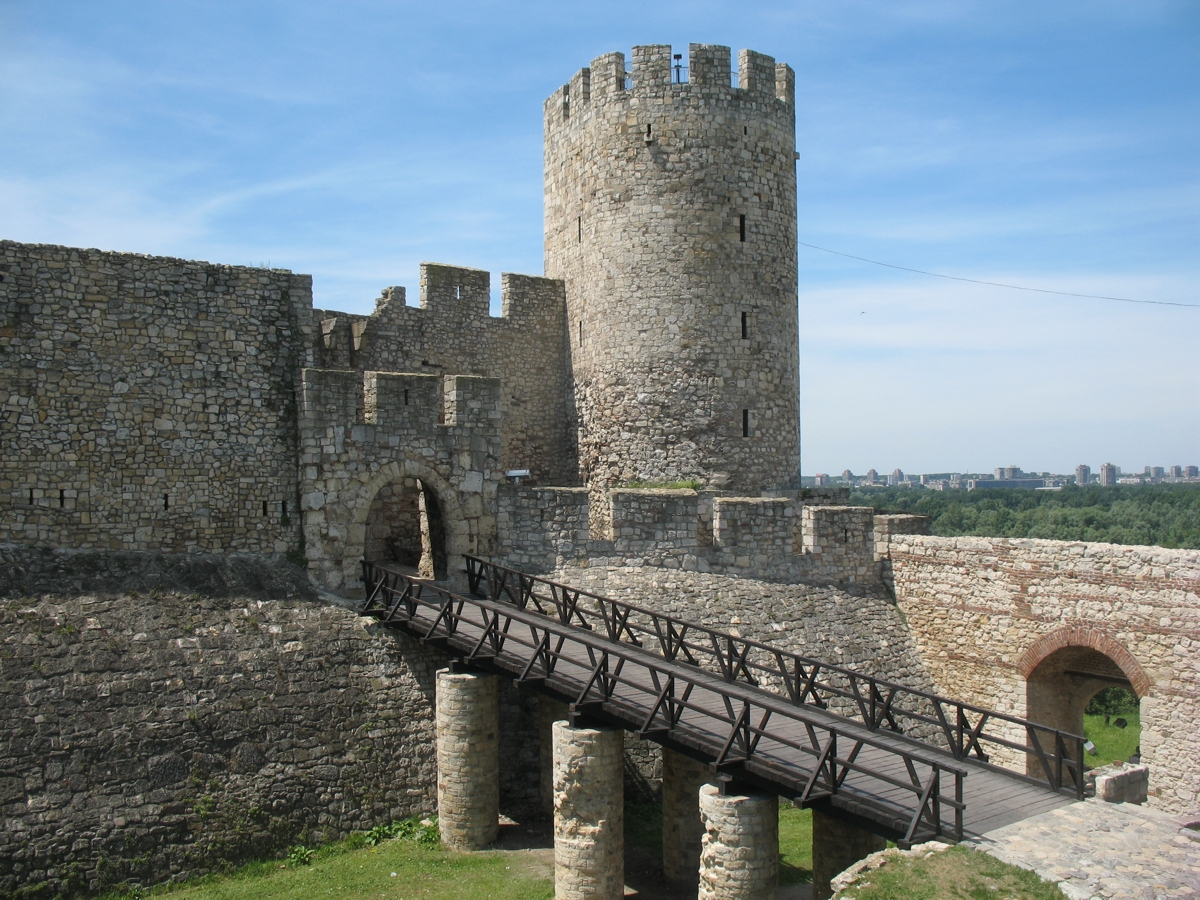
Despot Stefan Tower

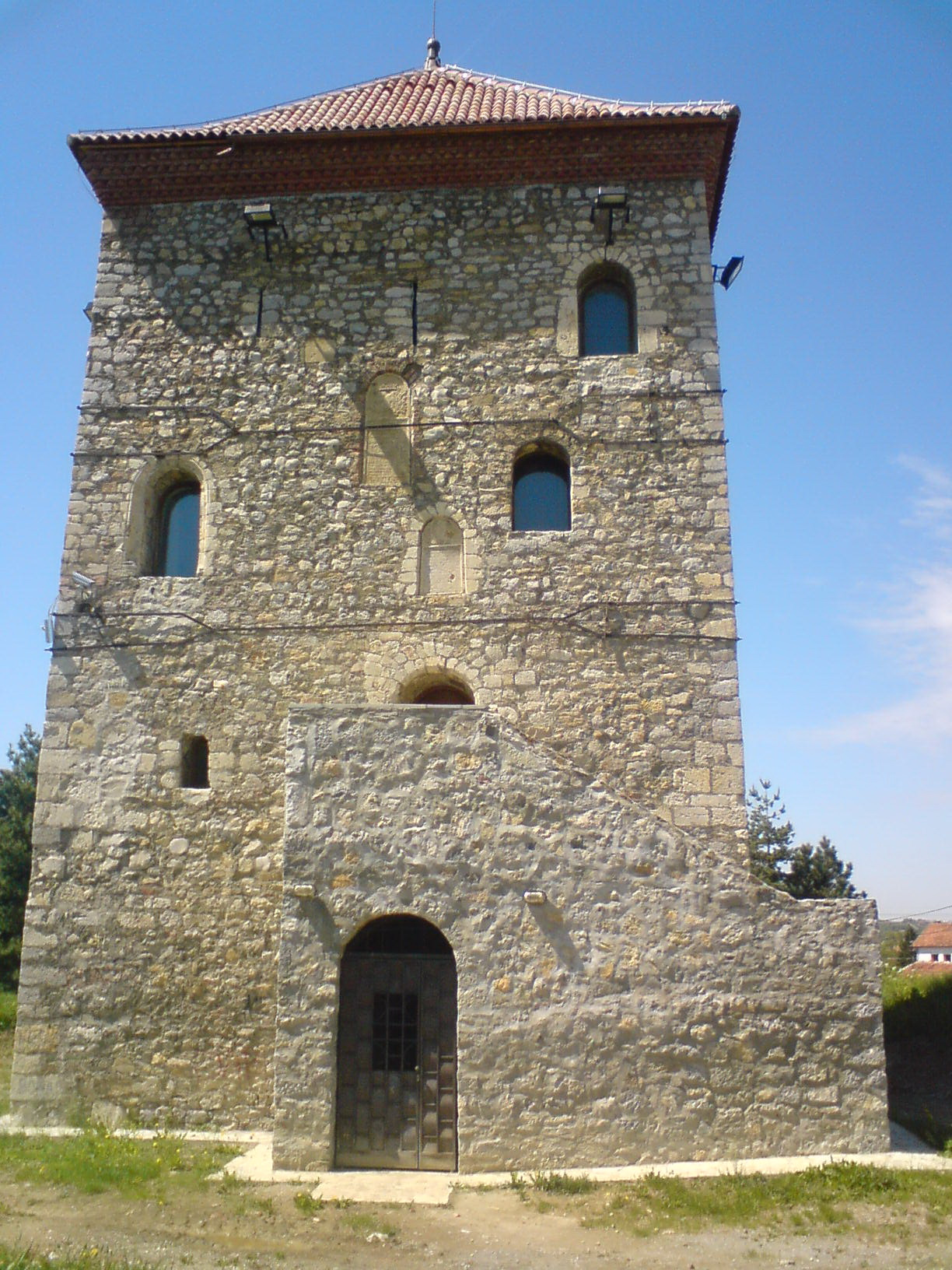
Nenadović's Tower, in Valjevo, Serbia

Despot Stefan Tower (Serbian: Деспотова кула; Despotova kula) was built c. 1405 by medieval carpenter-masons for Serbian Despot Stefan Lazarević's noble family in Belgrade, Serbia, a couple of years after the city became the capital and defensive house of the Serbian Despotate.

Nenadović's Tower (Serbian: Кула Ненадовића) was built by Jakov Nenadović in 1813 in Valjevo, Šumadija. Initially it was used by rebels during the First Serbian Uprising of the Serbian Revolution. Ottomans later used it as prison.

== In Montenegro ==
Examples include the Ganić tower house in Rožaje.

== In Romania ==
Cula Duca (1812-1827) from Măldărești, Oltenia

There are culă-type houses, built by boyars in what is today Romania, in following modern Romanian counties (județ), from west to east: several in Mehedinți, Gorj, Dolj, Vâlcea, Olt, Argeș, with one example in Teleorman. The bulk are situated in the historical region of Oltenia, with only those from Argeș and Teleorman being in Muntenia. Both Muntenia and Oltenia were part of the historical Principality of Wallachia.

== See also ==
- Architecture of Kosovo
- Architecture of Serbia
- Architecture of Montenegro
- Architecture of Albania
