= Culă =

Romanian fortifications

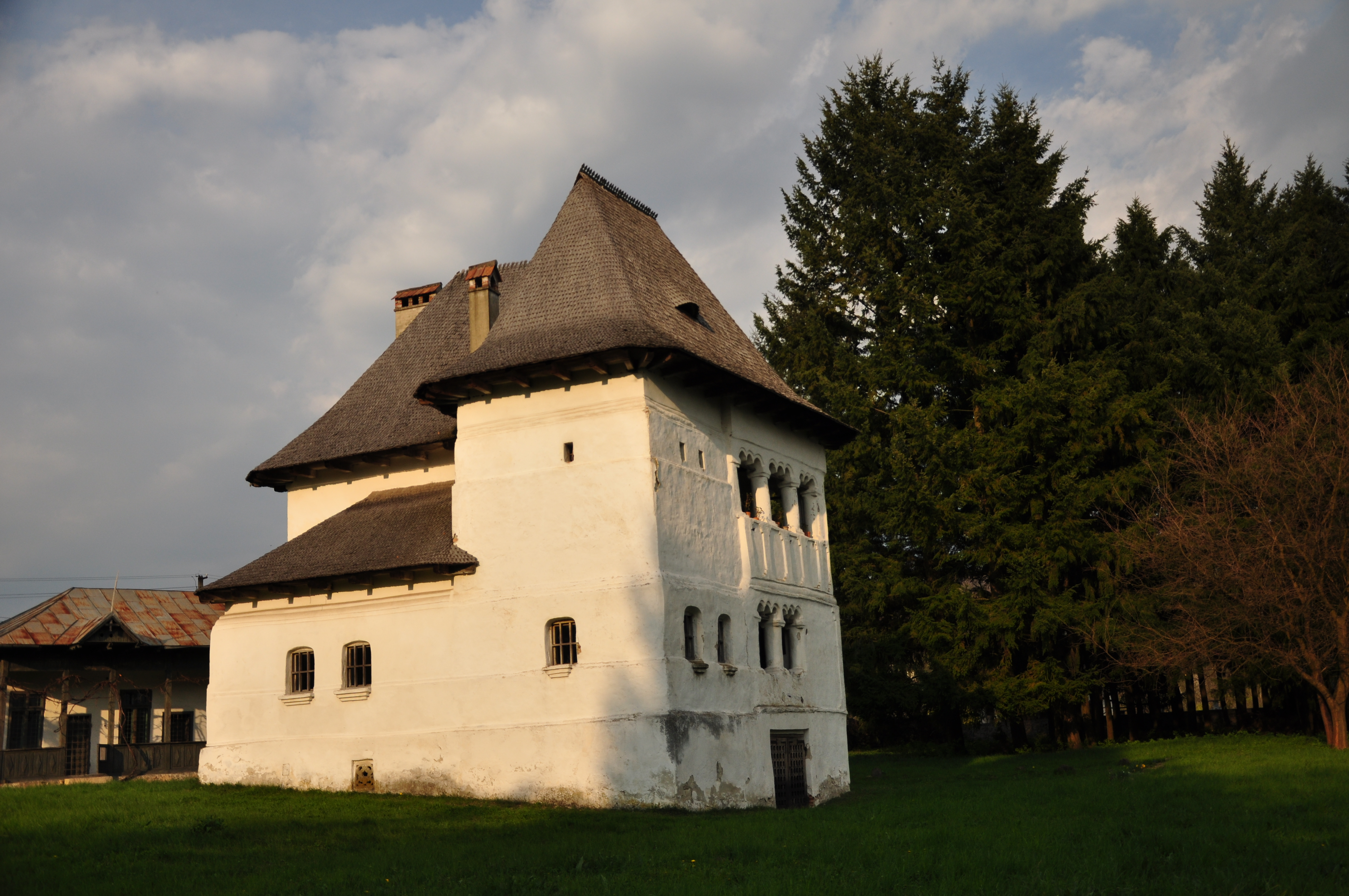
Cula Greceanu from Măldărești, Vâlcea

A culă (plural: cule; from Turkish kule "tower, turret") is a type of semi-fortified dwelling historically found in the Oltenia region of Romania, with notable examples also in Muntenia (in the counties of Argeș and Teleorman). Constructed primarily between the 17th and 19th centuries, these structures served as residences for the boyar aristocracy, offering protection against invasions and local uprisings. Architecturally, cule are characterized by their tower-like appearance, typically featuring multiple levels, thick walls, and defensive elements such as narrow windows or loopholes for archers. The design reflects a blend of domestic comfort and military functionality, embodying the capacity of traditional Romanian architecture to assimilate foreign influences while remaining distinctively local. Similar tower houses are prevalent throughout the Balkans, including in Serbia and Albania.

== List of Cule ==
=== Argeș County ===
Name	Photograph	Location	Construction	Source
Cula Racovița		Racovița, Mioveni	1797	
Cula Drugănescu		Retevoiești, Pietroșani	1822	
Cula Sultănica		Șuici	18th century	
Ruined culă, Vlădești		Vlădești	17th century	
Ruins of Ioniță Brătianu's culă		Șuici	1847	

=== Dolj County ===
Name	Photograph	Location	Construction	Source
Cula Poenaru		Almăj	1764 (Note: First built in 1764; later modified in 1896.)	
Cula Izvoranu-Geblescu		Brabova	18th century	
Cula Cernăteștilor		Cernătești, Dolj	18th century	

=== Gorj County ===
Name	Photograph	Location	Construction	Source
Cula Cartianu		Cartiu, Turcinești	1760	
Cula Cornoiu		Bumbești-Jiu	18th century	
Cula Crăsnaru		Groșerea, Aninoasa	18th century	
Cula I.C. Davani		Larga, Samarinești	19th century	
Cula Eftimie Nicolaescu		Runcurel, Mătăsari	19th century	
Cula Cioabă-Chintescu		Șiacu, Slivilești	1762 (Note: First built in 1762; later modified between 1818 and 1825.)	

=== Mehedinți County ===
Name	Photograph	Location	Construction	Source
Cula Cuțui		Broșteni	1815	
Cula Tudor Vladimirescu		Cerneți, Șimian	1800	
Cula Nistor		Cerneți, Șimian	1812	
Ruins of cula Lazu		Lazu, Malovăț	1850	

=== Olt County ===
Name	Photograph	Location	Construction	Source
Cula Galița		Câmpu Mare, Dobroteasa	1790-1800	
Cula Călețeanu		Piatra-Olt	19th century	

=== Teleorman County ===
Name	Photograph	Location	Construction	Source
Costea's culă		Frăsinet	18th century (Note: First built in the 18th century; later modified between the 19th and 20th centuries.)	

=== Vâlcea County ===
Name	Photograph	Location	Construction	Source
Cula Bujoreanu		Bujoreni	18th century	
Cula Duca		Măldărești	1827	
Cula Greceanu		Măldărești	18th century (Note: Oldest part from 1517, but mainly built in the 18th century.)	

== See also ==
- Tower houses in the Balkans
