= Osolnica =

Osolnica Осолница Osolnitsa
- Village
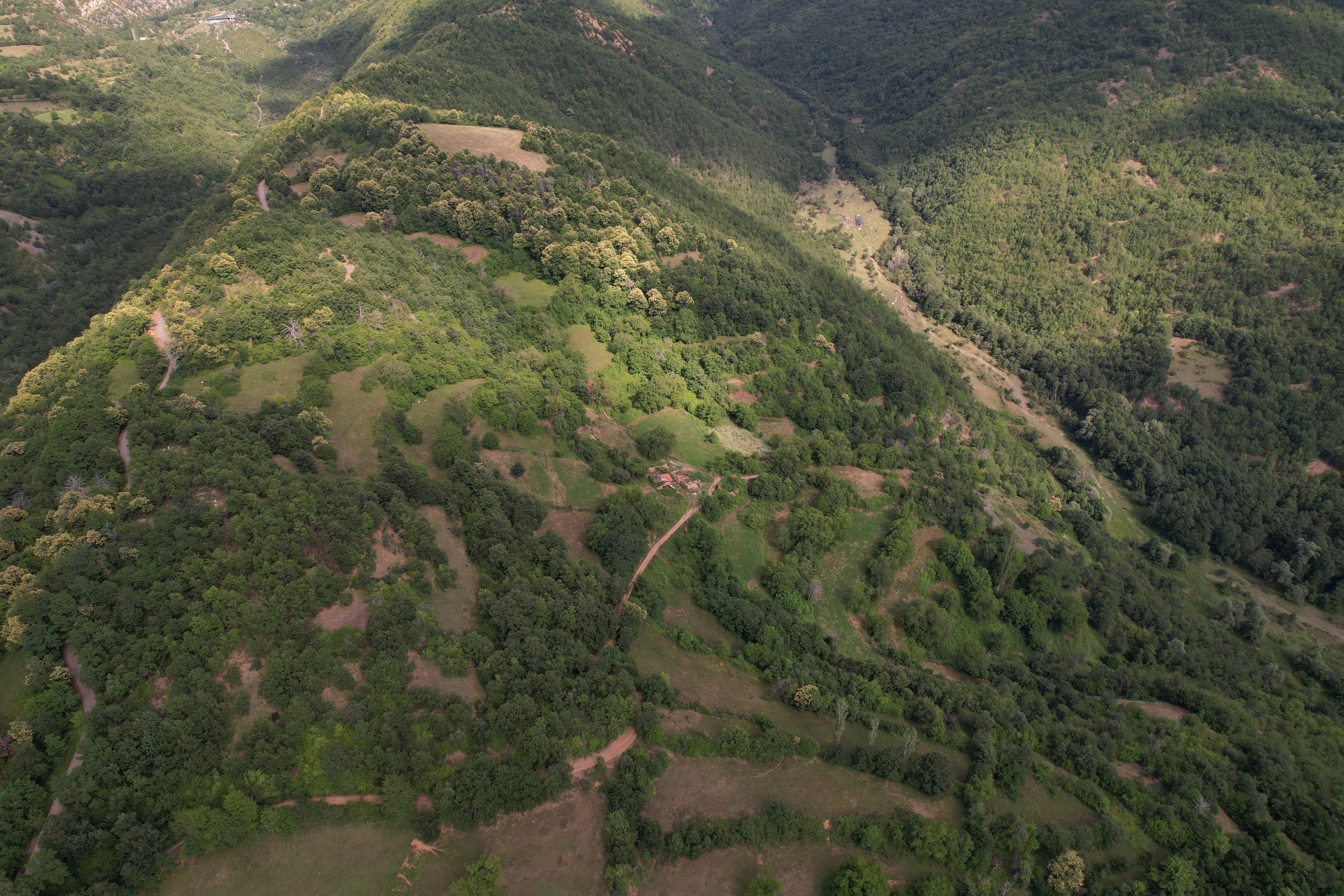
- Airview of the village

- Location within North Macedonia
- Coordinates: 41°27′20″N 20°33′38″E
- Country: North Macedonia
- Region: Southwestern
- Municipality: Centar Župa

Population (2002)
  - Total: 0
- Time zone: UTC+1 (CET)
  - Summer (DST): UTC+2 (CEST)
- Car plates: DB
- Website: .

Osolnica (Macedonian: Осолница, Turkish: Osolnitsa) is an abandoned village in the municipality of Centar Župa, North Macedonia.

== Demographics ==
Osolnicа (Ostolnica) is recorded in the Ottoman defter of 1467 as a village in the vilayet of Upper Dibra, part of the timar of Topçi Ali. The settlement was recorded as abandoned.

According to Ottoman tahrir defters from the 1520s, 16 villages (all present-day Centar Župa villages) associated with Kala-i Kodžadžik had no Muslim population. However, the Muslim population increased in subsequent years. This was likely part of the Islamization of Macedonia under Turkish rule.

The village, when previously inhabited, was traditionally populated by a Turkish speaking community consisting of Turks.

According to the 2002 census, the village had a total of 0 inhabitants.
