= Icoanei Church =

Heritage site in Bucharest, Romania

Coordinates: 44°26′35″N 26°06′23″E

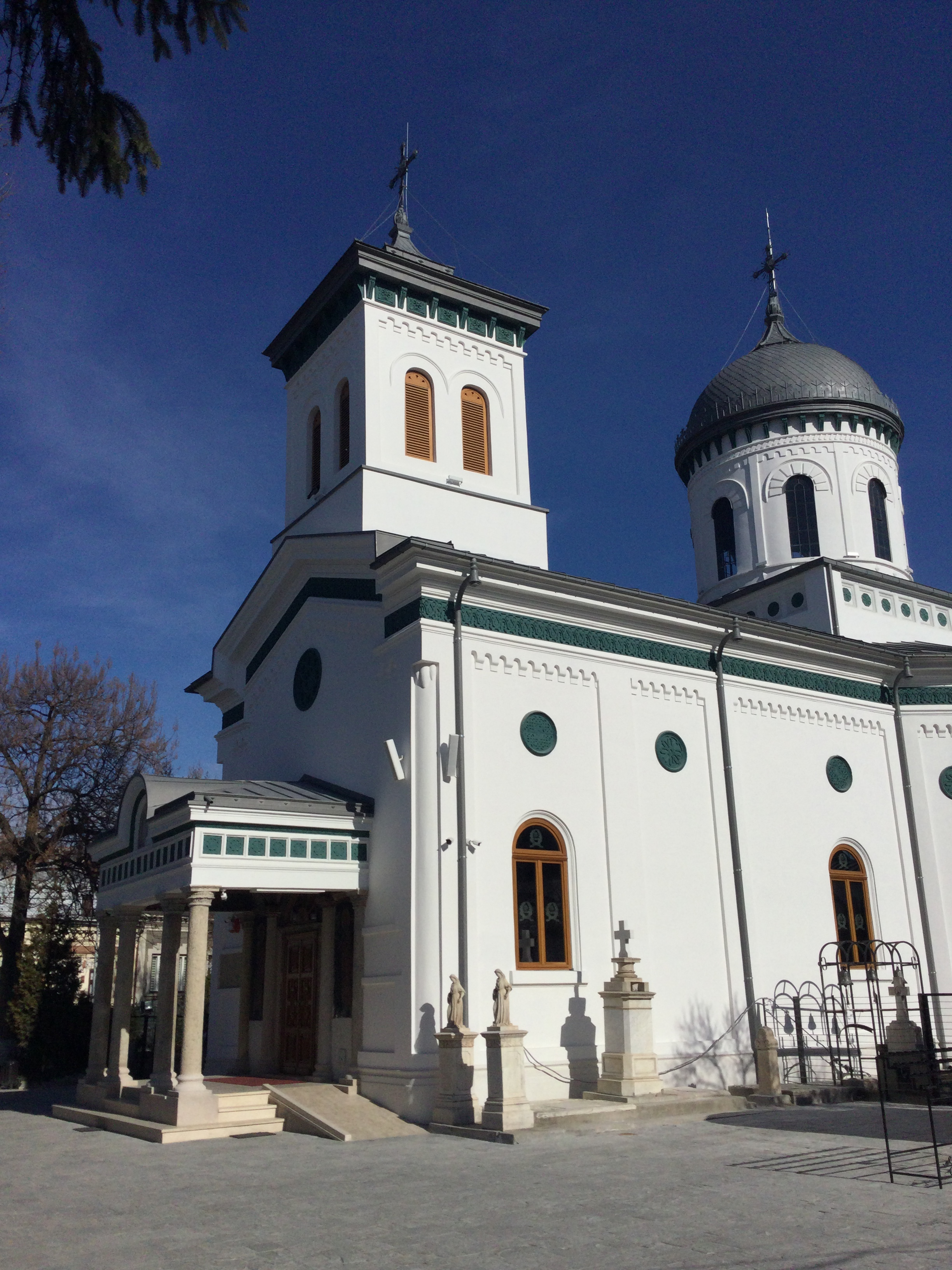
Icoanei Church

The Icoanei Church (Romanian: Biserica Icoanei) is a Romanian Orthodox church located at 12 Icoanei Street in Bucharest, Romania. It is dedicated to the Holy Trinity.

The church derives its name from a 1682 icon that mentions a wooden church which, according to Nicolae Iorga, was built by Ceauș (messenger) David Corbea, whom Constantin Brâncoveanu sent as emissary to the court of Peter the Great. In its early years, it was thus also known as Ceauș David or Popa Dima, after a priest. In its stead, Mihail Băbeanu, former privy secretary to the Prince of Wallachia, built a domed wooden church surrounded by cells, variously dated to 1745-1750 or 1770. The first masonry church, dedicated to the Trinity, dates to 1784–1786; its ktetor was mercenary captain Panait Băbeanu, nephew of Mihail. As depicted in the votive painting, this church had three domes and a three-lobed plan, and was painted in fresco. Panait added twelve cells for poor widows.

Damaged by the 1838 earthquake, the church was restored by Pană Băbeanu, the grandson of Panait, assisted by parishioners. The iconostasis, still in use, dates to 1850. By 1862, the church was in ruins, its funds wasted by Ioniță Băbeanu. In 1873, Elena Băbeanu commissioned a substantial renovation, led by architect Alexandru Orăscu, which gave the building its current form. The 1887-1889 restoration added the portico, redid the domes and enlarged the windows. Under the auspices of another Mihail Băbeanu, the painting was redone in 1889 by a pupil of Gheorghe Tattarescu, covering the old frescoes. In 1928, architect Paul Smărăndescu undertook a thorough renovation, removing the central dome. Consolidation took place after the earthquakes of 1940 and 1977, while work on the iconostasis and painting unfolded in 1967 and 1980. The church was re-sanctified in 1991.

The cross-shaped church measures 23 meters long by 9 to 10.8 meters wide; the apses are in slight relief and circular both inside and out. The round Pantocrator dome above the nave has eight windows; the square bell tower above the narthex, aligned with the western facade, has two large windows on each side. The roof is flat, in two halves, terminating in a tympanum at the bell tower base. Entry is through a small open portico with a decorated frieze; it rests on pairs of stone columns. The facade ornamentation is slightly in relief: a cornice with small palmettes underscored by a sawtooth design, floral rosettes placed above the windows, icons of Saints Peter and Paul to the sides of the entrance. The interior windows are colored in pastel tones, with blue predominant. The tin-coated domes are decorated similarly to the facade.

The church is listed as a historic monument by Romania's Ministry of Culture and Religious Affairs. Also listed is the tomb of General Ioan Odobescu. The yard holds several other graves, the earliest being from 1846. The icon of the Virgin Mary, which attracts visitors, is kept before the altar.
