= Dolno Kosovrasti =

- Village
- Долно Косоврасти
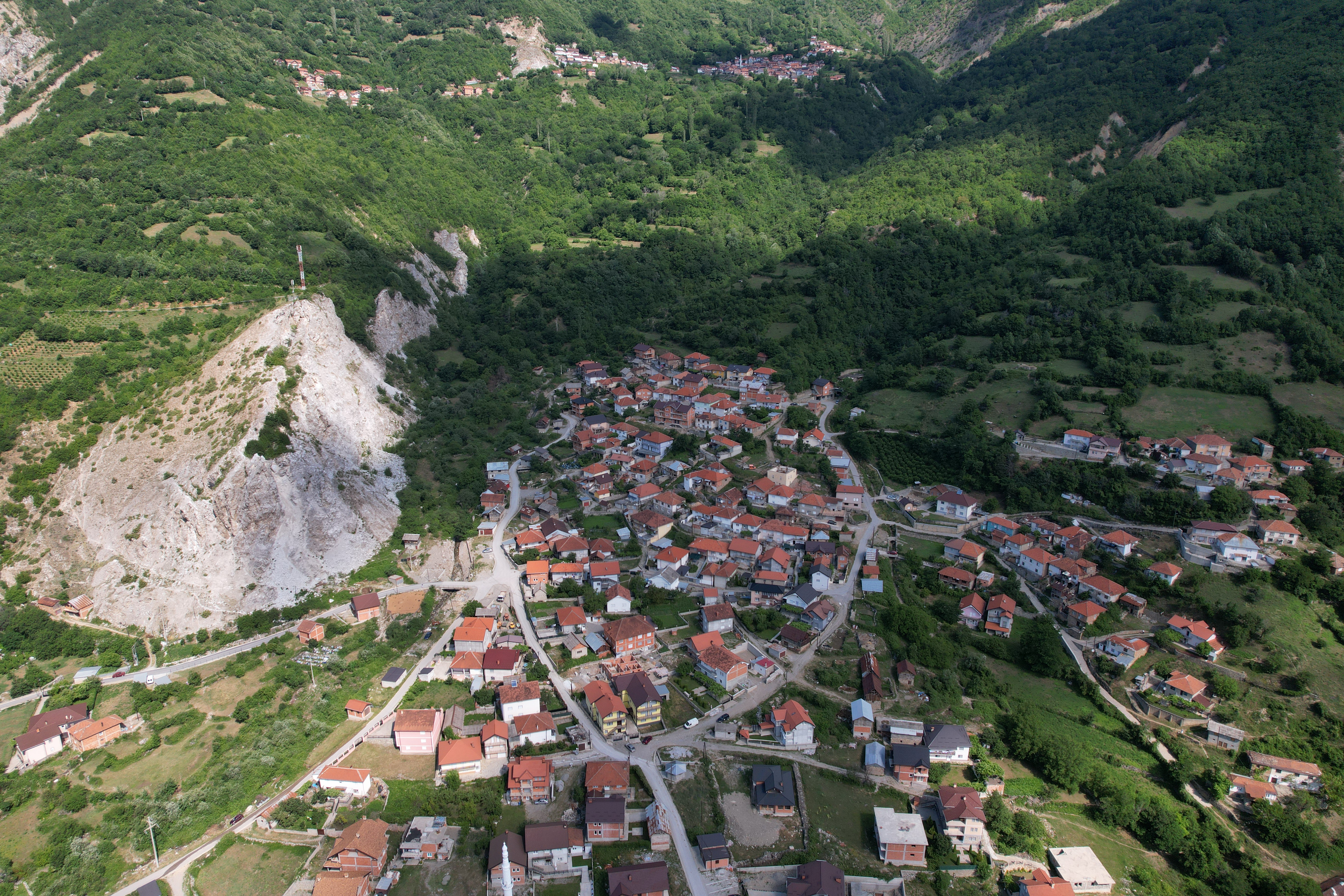
- View of the village

- Location within North Macedonia
- Coordinates: 41°32′N 20°35′E
- Country: North Macedonia
- Region: Southwestern
- Municipality: Debar
- Elevation: 625 m (2,051 ft)

Population (2021)
  - Total: 752
- Time zone: UTC+1 (CET)
  - Summer (DST): UTC+2 (CEST)
- Car plates: DB

Dolno Kosovrasti (Macedonian: Долно Косоврасти) is a village in the municipality of Debar, North Macedonia.

== Demographics ==
Dolno Kosovrasti (Dolna Kostobrast) is attested in the Ottoman defter of 1467 as a village in the ziamet of Reka was under the authority of Karagöz Bey. The village had a total of 16 households and the anthroponymy attested was Slavic-Albanian in character, with a predominance of Slavic names while Albanian anthroponyms comprised around a quarter of those attested.

In the 1901 Ethnographic Map of the Bitola Vilayet, produced by the Sofia Cartography Institute, Dolno Kosovrati part of the Sanjak of Dibra—is depicted as a village of 64 households with a mixed population of Bulgarians, Pomaks, Albanians, and Turks.

Dolno Kosovrasti has traditionally been inhabited by an Orthodox Macedonian and Torbeš population.

As of the 2021 census, Dolno Kosovrasti had 752 residents with the following ethnic composition:

- Turks 286
- Macedonians 282
- Others (including Torbeš) 96
- Persons for whom data are taken from administrative sources 85
- Albanians 3

According to the 2002 census, the village had a total of 813 inhabitants. Ethnic groups in the village include:

- Macedonians 388
- Turks 224
- Albanians 4
- Others 197
