= Pralenik =

- Village
- Праленик
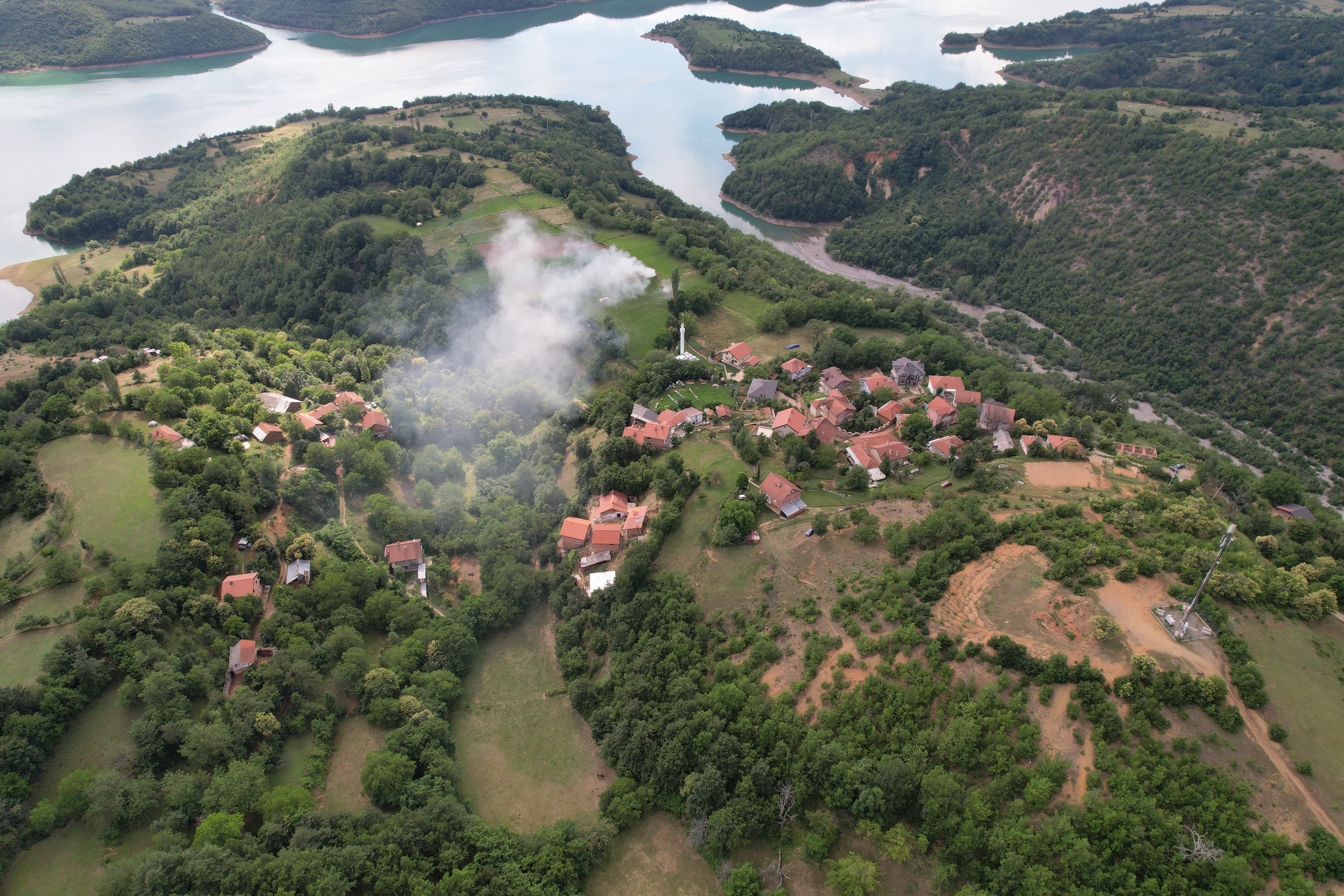
- Airview of the village

- Location within North Macedonia
- Coordinates: 41°27′28″N 20°32′34″E
- Country: North Macedonia
- Region: Southwestern
- Municipality: Centar Župa

Population (2021)
  - Total: 144
- Time zone: UTC+1 (CET)
  - Summer (DST): UTC+2 (CEST)
- Car plates: DB
- Website: .

Pralenik (Macedonian: Праленик, Turkish: Pralenik) is a village in the municipality of Centar Župa, North Macedonia.

== Demographics ==
Pralenik (Provalleniq) is recorded in the Ottoman defter of 1467 as a village in the vilayet of Upper Dibra. The settlement was abandoned.

According to Ottoman tahrir defters from the 1520s, 16 villages (all present-day Centar Župa villages) associated with Kala-i Kodžadžik had no Muslim population. However, the Muslim population increased in subsequent years. This was likely part of the Islamization of Macedonia under Turkish rule.

In the 1901 Ethnographic Map of the Bitola Vilayet, produced by the Sofia Cartography Institute, Provalenik part of the Sanjak of Dibra—is depicted as a village of 82 households with a mixed population of Bulgarians, Pomaks, Albanians, and Turks.

According to the 1942 Italian protectorate of Albania census, Pralenik was inhabited by 126 Muslim Albanians.

As of the 2021 census, Pralenik had 144 residents with the following ethnic composition:

- Turks 137
- Persons for whom data are taken from administrative sources 7

According to the 2002 census, the village had a total of 177 inhabitants. Ethnic groups in the village include:

- Turks 176
- Others 1
