= Strikçan =

- Administrative unit
- Location within Albania
- Coordinates: 41°29′26″N 20°24′25″E
- Country: Albania
- County: Dibër
- Municipality: Bulqizë
- Time zone: UTC+1 (CET)
  - Summer (DST): UTC+2 (CEST)

Strikçan is a village in the Dibër County of northern Albania, near Bulqizë, about 56 miles (90 km) from the capital, Tirana.

Its name is variously recorded as Strichichani, Strighician, Strikcan, Strikcani, Strikçan, Tatusi, Tatuši, and Стричичани.

There is a tower house or kulla, Kulla e Llaxhaçeve in the village which is recognised as a national cultural monument.

== Archaeology ==
In 2025, archaeologists reported the discovery of a Roman-era tomb in Strikçan. The structure, dated to the third and fourth centuries AD, measures about 30 ft × 20 ft (9.1 m × 6.1 m) and includes a monumental staircase, suggesting it functioned as a mausoleum. The tomb also contains a bilingual inscription in Latin and Greek, the first recorded in the surrounding region, with the Latin text dedicated to Jupiter.
