= Draslajca =

Draslajca Драслајца
- Village
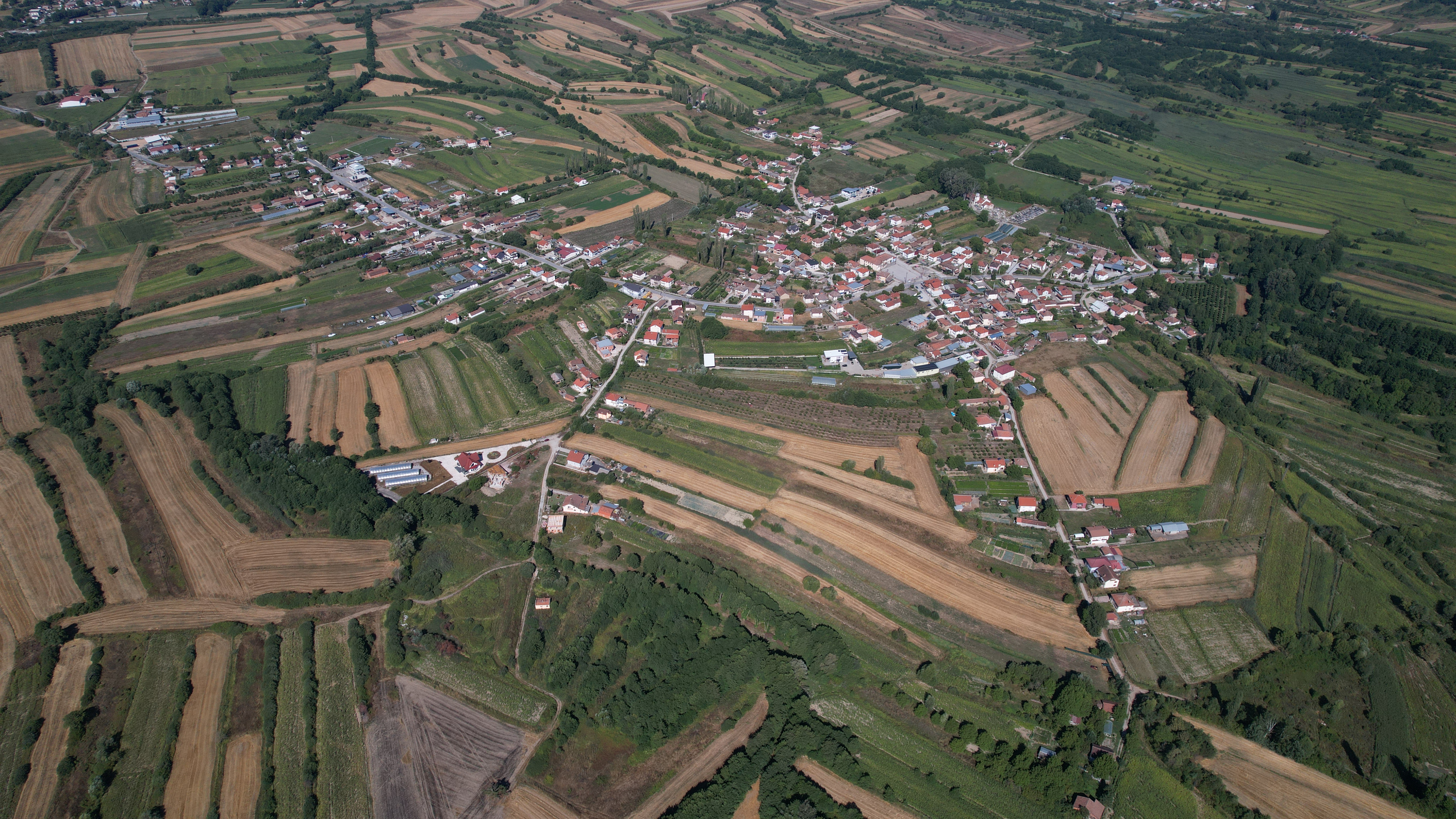
- Air view of the village

- Location within North Macedonia
- Coordinates: 41°12′56″N 20°40′45″E
- Country: North Macedonia
- Region: Southwestern
- Municipality: Struga

Population (2002)
  - Total: 778
- Time zone: UTC+1 (CET)
  - Summer (DST): UTC+2 (CEST)
- Area code: +389
- Car plates: OH
- Website: www.draslajca.com.mk

Draslajca (Macedonian: Драслајца) is a village in the south-western region of North Macedonia.

== Information ==
Draslajca is a medium-sized village in the centre of the Struga municipality. It has three general stores, a granary, an agency from the Government of North Macedonia, and the Makedonski Dom in the Sredselo (centre of the village). The village is home to a large open soccer field and two Churches. The Church Sveta Bogorodica and the Manastir Sveta Nedela are both at the northern end of the village.

== History ==
The first mention of Draslajce in literature is in a Turkisk census document of the Ohrid Sanjak in 1543. It mentions the village under the name Dragoslavica. The village was based on corn-farming and animal keeping. In Ethnographie des Vilayets d'Adrianople, de Monastir et de Salonique the French newspaper Le Courrier d'Orient had the village listed as having 40 households and a male population of 112 people, all Bulgarian. According to ethnographer Vasil Kanchov in 1900 the village had a population of 340 Bulgarians. The village was within the borders of the Bulgarian Exarchate. The Exarchate secretary Dimitar Mishev, in 1905 the village was inhabited by 360 Bulgarian exarchists and a functioning Bulgarian school.

Elders in the town say the name is derived from драс (dras) meaning 'wild grass' and лајца (lajca) is old word for 'scythe'.

The key location of the village in the flatlands was key to its survival and property. After the Balkan Wars all of the population of the neighbouring village of Livada began to migrate to the village. This caused the population to boom while reducing the number of inhabitants of Livada.

During World War Two Draslajca was occupied by the Italian occupiers. They had a good relationship with the local villages and set up camp in the village. They soon built the village "Dom" or home in the center of the village. This building is still present in the village today. The Italians were expelled by the partisan forces and a monument was constructed for the Partisan fighters.

== Geography ==
The Village of Draslajca is situated in the center of the Struško Pole. It is 4.4 km (3 mi) north of Struga and 5.7 km (4 mi) north-west of Ohrid Airport. The nearest villages are Moroišta (1.5 km or 1 mi) and Bidžovo (1.7 km or 1 mi). The Village is situated on the Eastern side of the Black Drin river. The village is situated in flat lands and is surrounded by fertile farming lands and pastures. It is situated at 698 m (2,290 ft) above sea level.

== Demography ==
Many of the townsfolk have origins from the neighbouring village of Livada as this is where the population of Draslajca is originally from. After World War Two the remaining Macedonians in Livada began to leave the village and settle in Draslajca. This pattern of migration turned Livada into an exclusively Albanian village. Many more people from neighbouring villages also began to settle in Draslajca.

2002 data
Ethnicity	Total
Macedonians	775
Serbs	2
Romani	1
