= Dovolan =

Dovolan Доволан
- Village
- Location within Albania
- Coordinates: 41°37′16″N 20°26′54″E
- Country: Albania
- County: Dibër
- Municipality: Dibër
- Administrative unit: Maqellarë
- Time zone: UTC+1 (CET)
  - Summer (DST): UTC+2 (CEST)

Dovolan (Macedonian: Доволан/Dovolan) is a village in the former Maqellarë Municipality in Dibër County in northeastern Albania. At the 2015 local government reform it became part of the municipality Dibër. It is located near the Macedonian border, on the mountain Dešat.

== History ==
Dovolan (Dovoljani) appears in the Ottoman defter of 1467 as a settlement with a total of five households. The anthroponymy attested depicts a mixed character with typical Albanian names appearing alongside more general Christian ones, although Slavic influences and Slavicisation are also present: Gjon Bazovići; Gjure, son of Andrija; Dimitri Koleci; Petka son of Popi; and Gjure, brother of Gjoni.

A demographic study published in 1878, reflecting statistics of the male population from 1873, stated that the village's population consisted of 40 households with 94 Bulgarian Christians and 53 Slavic Muslims.

Two members of the Macedonian-Adrianopolitan Volunteer Corps, Kiril Martinov and Kosto Ivanov, were natives of Dovolani.

During the first World War occupying Austro-Hungarian forces conducted a census (1916-1918) of parts of Albania they held and of Dovolan its ethnic demographics they recorded 259 Albanians, 44 Bulgarians, 136 others, 5 Romani while its religious composition was 258 Muslims and 51 Orthodox Christians. Linguists Klaus Steinke and Xhelal Ylli consider the overall census results to be accurate and reflective of much of the ethnic and religious demographics of the area during that time, however noting that the then identity of the Orthodox Slavic speaking populace was fluid as reflected in census declarations. Toward the end of the 1920s the Orthodox Slavic speaking population was located in only two villages of the Maqellarë area, Kërçisht i Epërm and Herebel while in the 1930s the population decline of Orthodox Slavophones continued.

A 1930 report listed the village of Dovolan as having 50 houses.

During the 2000s linguists Klaus Steinke and Xhelal Ylli seeking to corroborate villages cited in past literature as being Slavic speaking carried out fieldwork in villages of the area. Linguists Steinke and Ylli also noted that unlike the Gollobordë region, the villages of the Maqellarë administrative unit area do not have any Muslim Slavic speaking inhabitants.
