= Radostë =

Radostë: Radostë (Albanian); Радосте/Radoste (Serbian)
- Village
- Location within Kosovo
- Coordinates: 42.388710°N 20.537149°E
- Location: Kosovo
- District: Gjakovë
- Municipality: Rahovec

Population (2024)
  - Total: 1,507
- Time zone: UTC+1 (CET)
  - Summer (DST): UTC+2 (CEST)

Radostë (Albanian: Radostë, Serbian Cyrillic: Радосте/Radoste) is a village in Rahovec municipality.

== Demographics ==
As of 2024, the village had a total population of 1,507 people. Of this, approximately 96.88% were Albanians, while Ashkalis and Egyptians made up the rest of population.

== History ==
The village was recorded in the Ottoman register of 1591 with the name "Radostova". The village then had 9 households and mansions ('Bashtina'). The villagers primarily had Albanian and Islamic anthropological traits, there was also a small presence of Slavic anthropology. The mansions ('Bashtina') listed bore Islamic, Albanian and Slavic names.
