= Măldărești =

- Commune
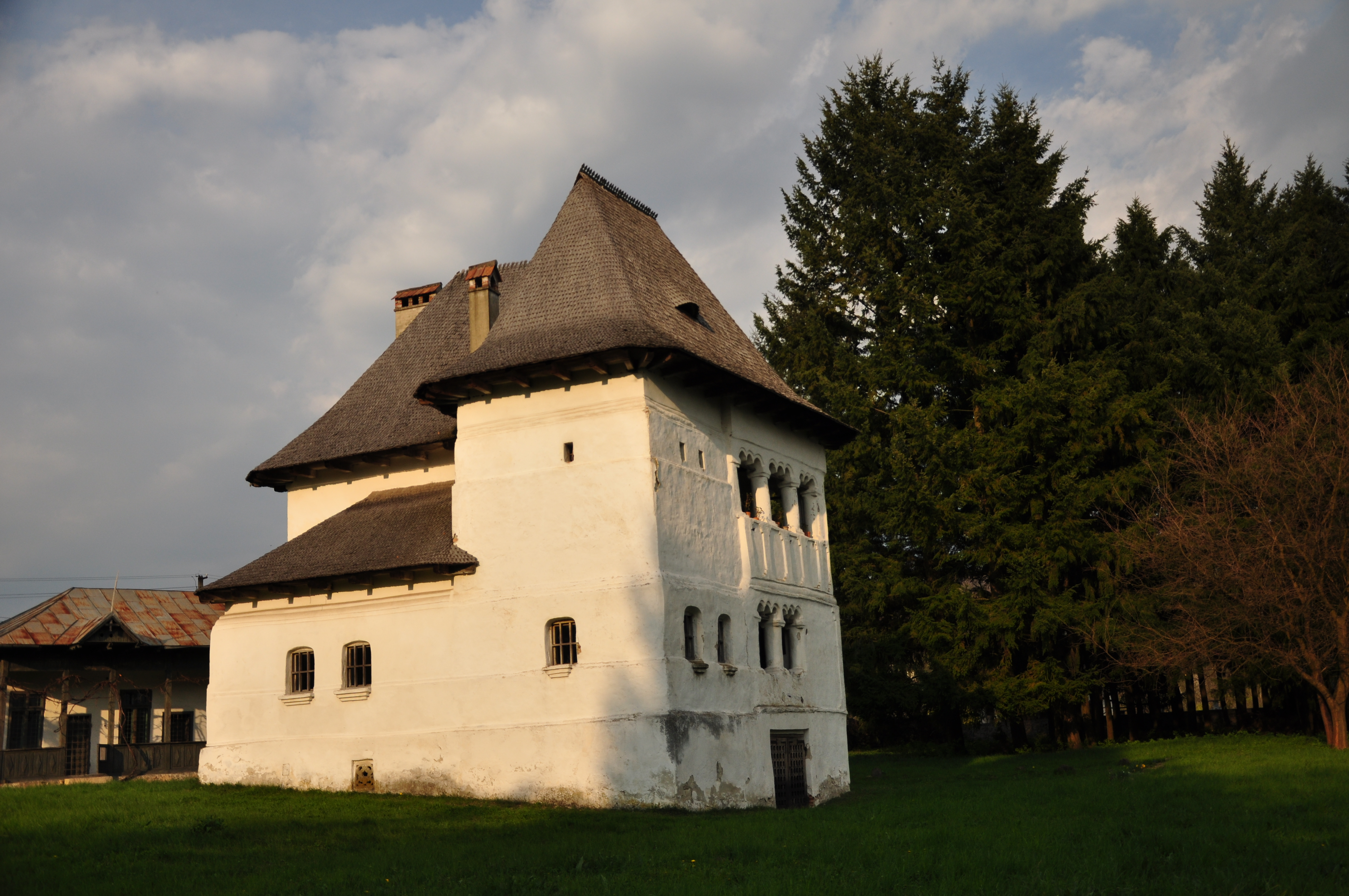
- Cula Greceanu in Măldărești village

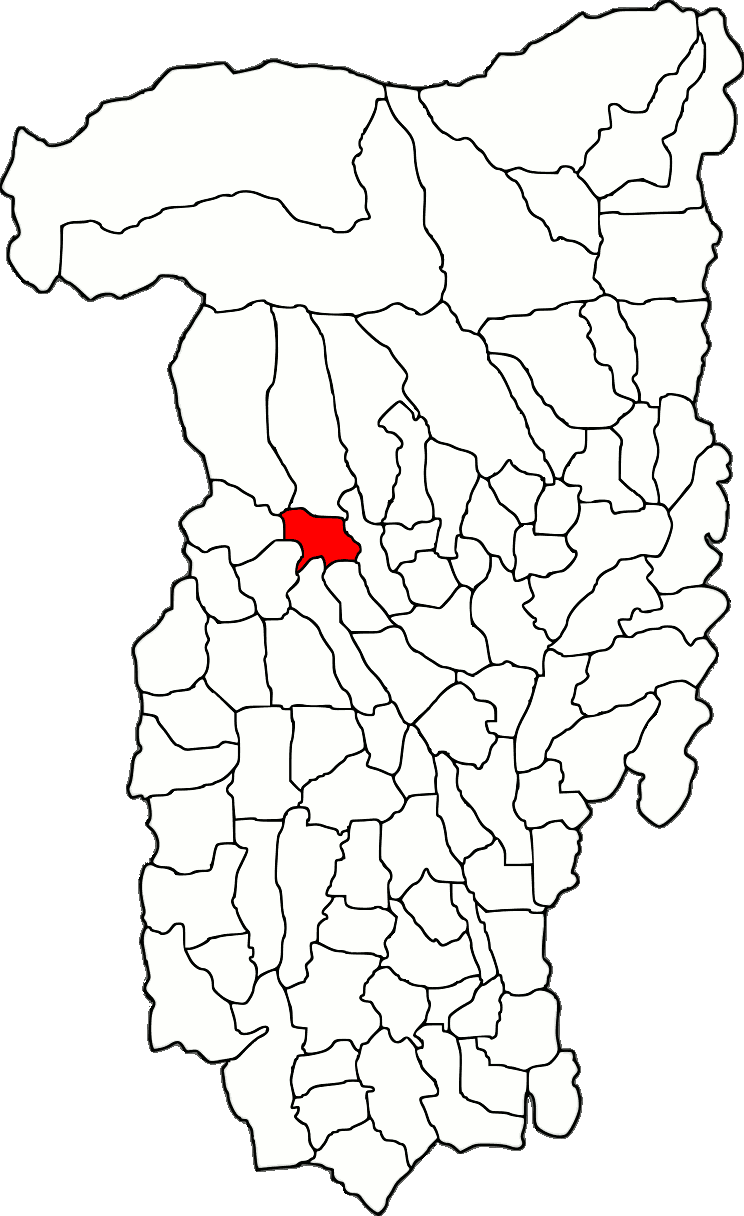
- Location in Vâlcea County

- Location in Romania
- Coordinates: 45°7′N 24°0′E
- Country: Romania
- County: Vâlcea

Government
  - Mayor (2020–2024): Ion Bociog (PSD)
- Area: 28.73 km^{2} (11.09 sq mi)
- Elevation: 419 m (1,375 ft)
- Population (2021-12-01): 1,715
  - Density: 59.69/km^{2} (154.6/sq mi)
- Time zone: UTC+02:00 (EET)
  - Summer (DST): UTC+03:00 (EEST)
- Postal code: 247370
- Area code: +(40) 250
- Vehicle reg.: VL
- Website: www.primariamaldaresti.ro

Măldărești is a commune located in Vâlcea County, Oltenia, Romania. It is composed of four villages: Măldărești, Măldăreștii de Jos, Roșoveni, and Telechești.

Historical population
Year	Pop.	±%
2002	2,069	—
2011	1,809	−12.6%
2021	1,715	−5.2%
Source: Census data
