= Ržanovo =

Ržanovo or Rzhanovo may refer to the following localities in North Macedonia:

- Ržanovo, Struga
- Ržanovo, Kavadarci
- Ržanovo mine, mine by Ržanovo, Kavadarci
