= Šum =

Šum Шум Shum
- Village
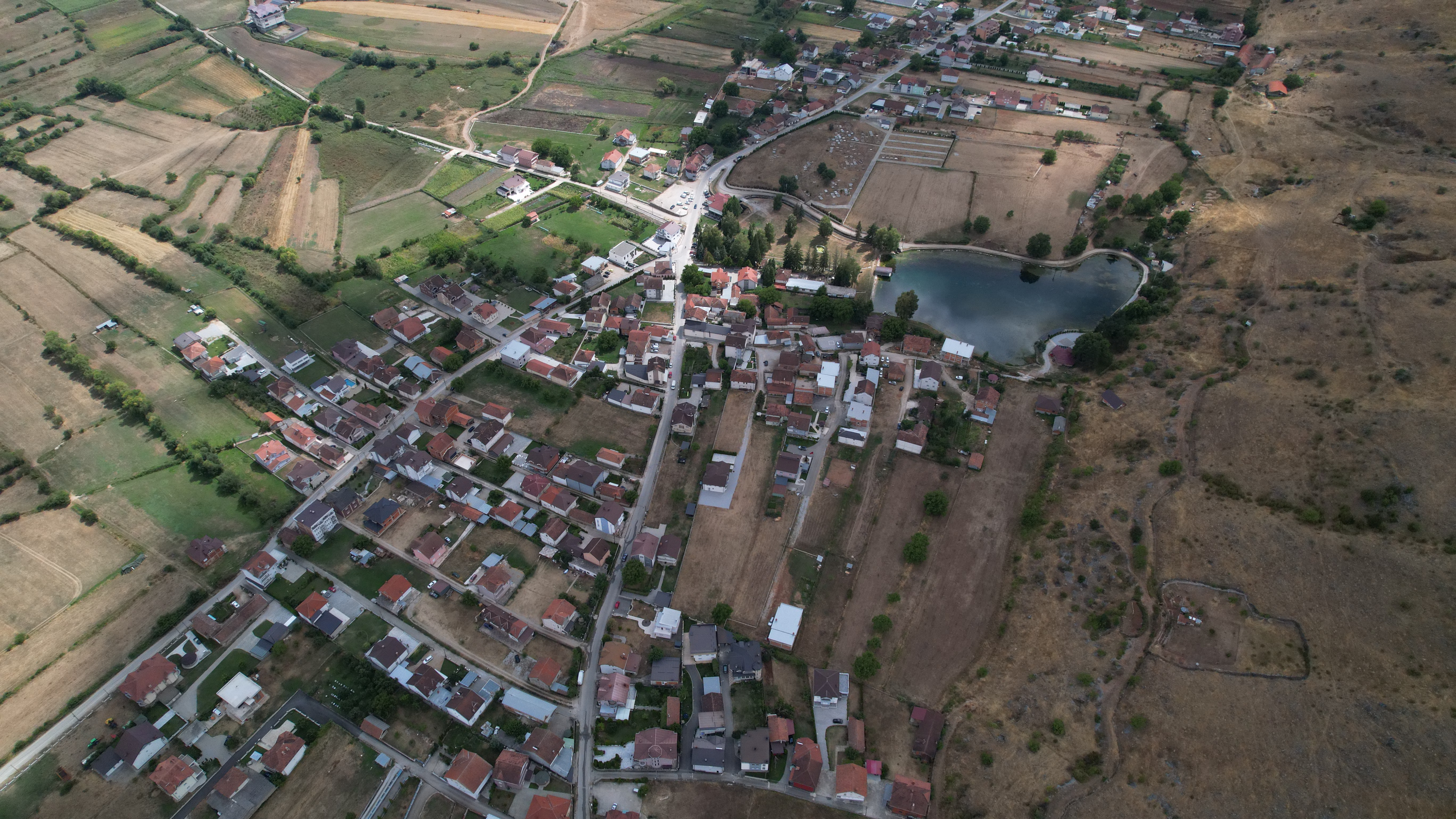
- Air view of the village

- Location within North Macedonia
- Coordinates: 41°10′48″N 20°37′48″E
- Country: North Macedonia
- Region: Southwestern
- Municipality: Struga
- Elevation: 684 m (2,244 ft)

Population (2021)
  - Total: 411
- Time zone: UTC+1 (CET)
  - Summer (DST): UTC+2 (CEST)
- Area code: +38946
- Car plates: SU
- Website: .

Šum (Macedonian: Шум, Albanian: Shum) is a village in the municipality of Struga, North Macedonia. The settlement is a newer village in the Struga area and has a mosque.

== Name ==
Šum has in its history been attached administratively to the neighboring village of Zagračani resulting in demographic and other data being counted along with that settlement. Past traces of the village name Šum are non-existent and the area only appears in an old map by Jaranov listing it as Dolno (Lower) Zagračani. Due to the close geographical proximity with Zagračani, the village toponyms of Šum are shared with its neighbour. A river flows through the village.

Local Albanian residents of Šum derive the origin of their village's name as stemming from the Albanian word shumë (meaning: a lot, much) from there being a lot of water due to the river. Šum is also located nearby Struga and in between there are remnants of a forest. In Macedonian the word for 'forest' is шума/šuma. The Albanian expression pronounced as shumë is according to Pianka Włodzimierz borrowed in this instance possibly from a local field name from a time when Zagračani was a Macedonian village, becoming the name of the village.

== Demographics ==
The Tosk dialect of the Albanian language is spoken in Šum.

As of the 2021 census, Šum had 411 residents with the following ethnic composition:

- Albanians 342
- Persons for whom data are taken from administrative sources 69

According to the 2002 census, the village had a total of 837 inhabitants. Ethnic groups in the village include:

- Albanians 823
- Macedonians 2
- Others 12
