= Toska, Struga =

Toska Тоска Toskë
- Village
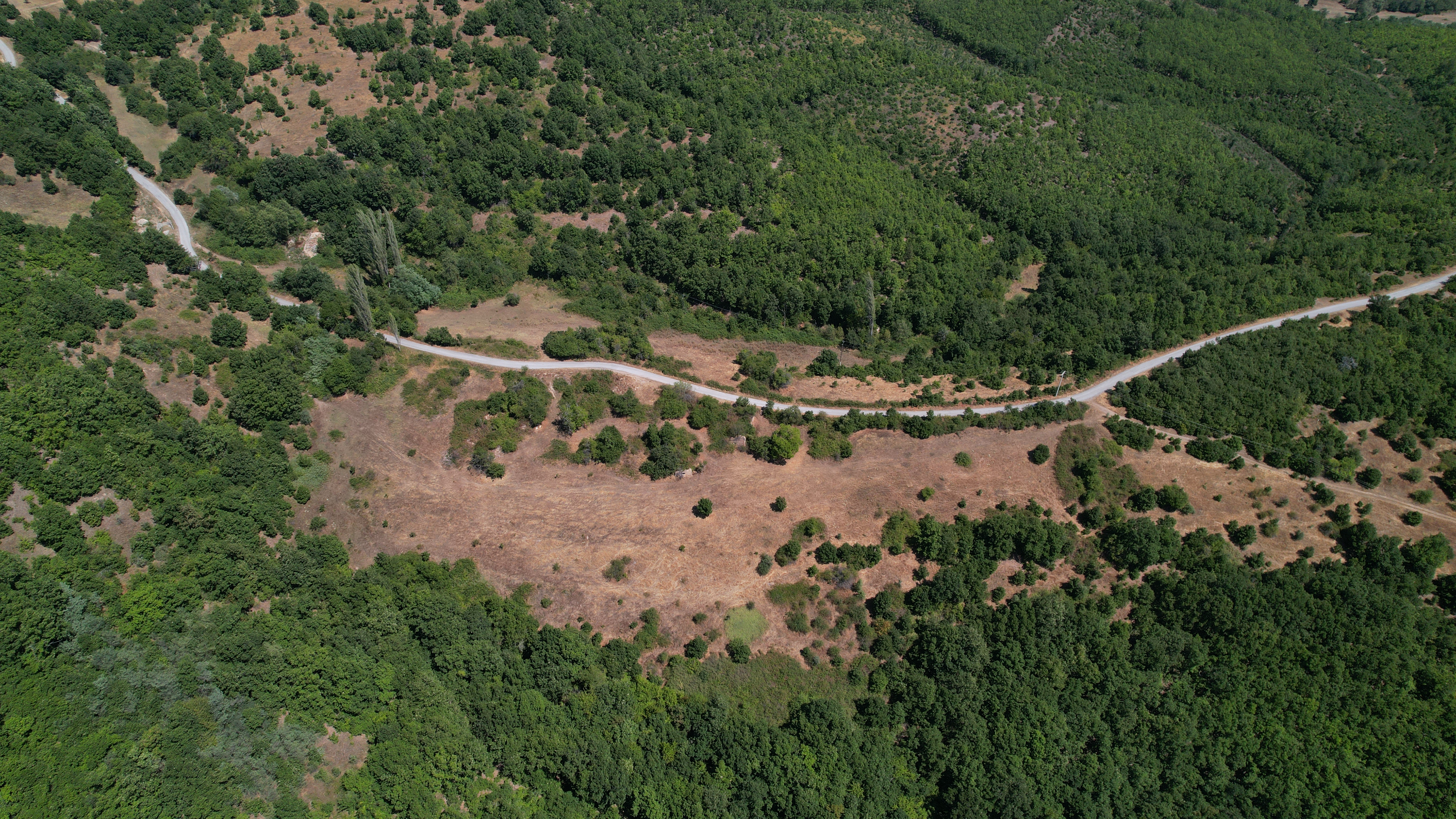
- Air view of the location of the village

- Location within North Macedonia
- Coordinates: 41°16′39″N 20°40′32″E
- Country: North Macedonia
- Region: Southwestern
- Municipality: Struga
- Highest elevation: 764 m (2,507 ft)

Population (2002)
  - Total: 0
- Time zone: UTC+1 (CET)
  - Summer (DST): UTC+2 (CEST)
- Area code: +38946
- Car plates: SU
- Website: .

Toska (Macedonian: Тоска, Albanian: Toskë) is a former village situated in the south-western region of North Macedonia. In the southern part of the Karaorman Mountain. The village is within the Municipality of Struga.

== History ==
The village was founded by the Toska Family after the family had migrated to the area. Before the family migrated they had resided in a region in southeastern Albania called Mokër. The Mokër region consists of 47 villages and is divided into two subregions Upper Mokër (Mokra e Sipërme) and Lower Mokër (Mokra e Poshtme).

On the Karaorman mountain, there stands three houses and a tower, each having endured destruction by fire at some point during the 2000s. The origins of these fires remain a mystery. While some structures remain standing, they have fallen into disuse due to the extensive damage inflicted upon them, now serving as poignant relics of the past. Additionally, scattered across the mountain, lie several rocks serving as makeshift gravestones for family members.

Today, members of the Toska family still own the land where the village resides. But they now reside in various locations, spanning across cities such as Struga and Skopje in North Macedonia, as well as in the United States, Germany, and Switzerland.

== Name ==
The name of the village is an Albanian toponym and surname derived from the term Tosk, which denotes a subgroup of southern Albanians.

== Demographics ==
During the 1953 and 1961 census, the settlement of Toska and its inhabitants were counted as being part of the village of Gorno Tateši and its inhabitants. The 1971 Yugoslav census was the last to record any people as residing in the village which contained 69 inhabitants, all Albanians.
