= Jablanica, Struga =

Jablanica
- Village
- Јабланица
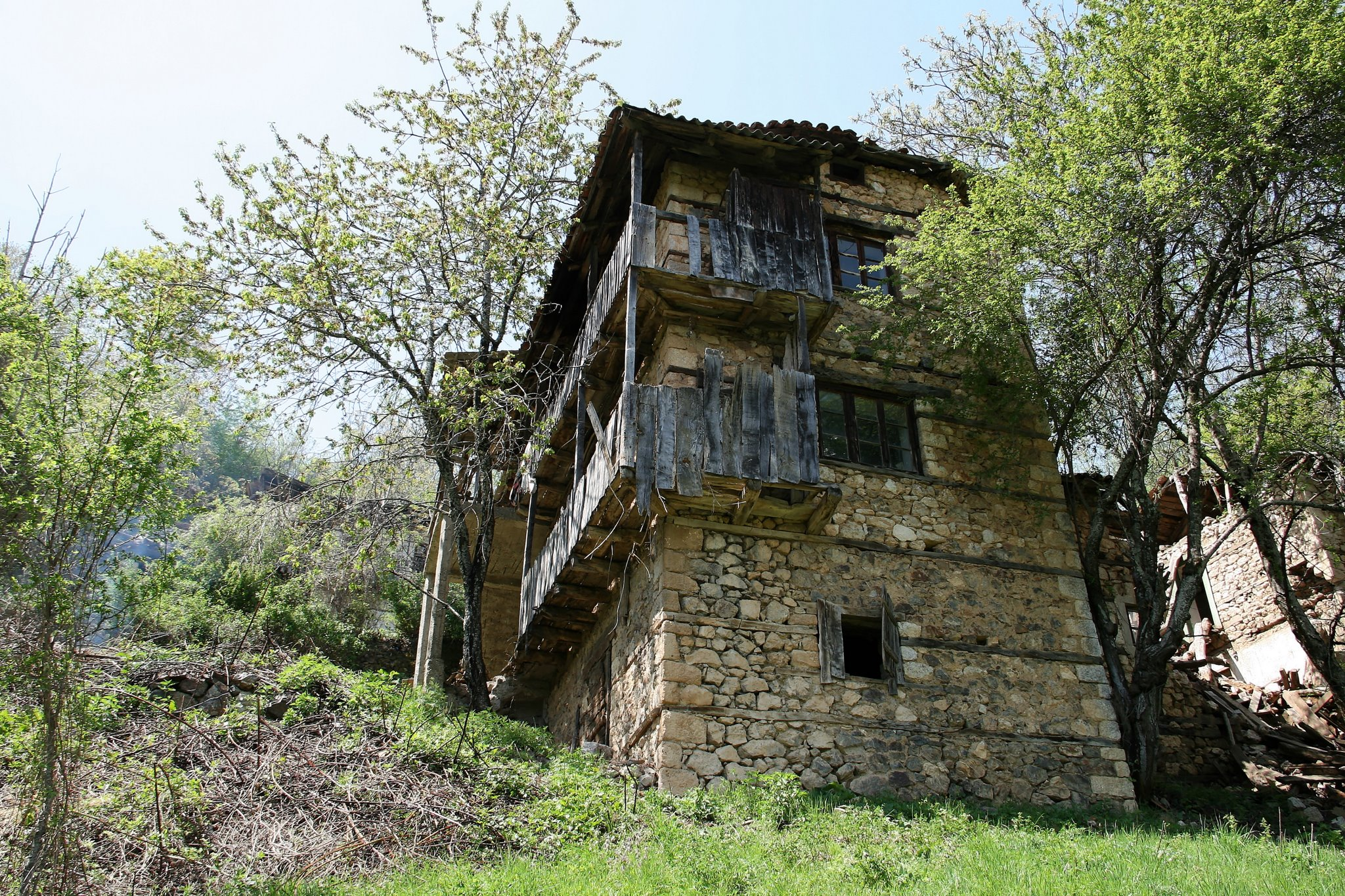

- Location within North Macedonia
- Coordinates: 41°12′47″N 20°38′06″E
- Country: North Macedonia
- Region: Southwestern
- Municipality: Struga
- Elevation: 831 m (2,726 ft)

Population (2002)
  - Total: 553
- Time zone: UTC+1 (CET)
  - Summer (DST): UTC+2 (CEST)
- Area code: +38946
- Car plates: SU

Jablanica (Macedonian: Јабланица) is a village in the municipality of Struga, North Macedonia.

== Demographics ==
Jablanica appears in the Ottoman defter of 1467 as a hass-ı mir-liva property in the vilayet of Dulgoberda. The settlement had a total of 20 households and the anthroponymy attested depicts a mixed Albanian-Slavic character, with a slight predominance of personal names belonging to the Slavic onomastic sphere: Pop Jovani, Nikolla Susjaku, Viho son of Pop Jovan, Dimitri Lopi, Dimitri Vasko, Shagdo son of Gjinko, Andrija son of Prodan, Nikolla son of Vilkashin, Gjergj Forkaleci, Rajko Kuzini, Nikolla son of Pop Jovan, Gjure son of Shagdo, Dimitri son of Rajko Kuzini, Petko son of Dimitri Vasko, Gjurec son of Gjorgo, Alekoja son of Nikolla, Miho son of Dimitri, Dragoslav son of Nikolla, Miho son of Gjon, and Radoslav son of Prodan.

Jablanica has traditionally been inhabited by Orthodox Christian Macedonians and a Torbeš population.

According to the 1943 Albanian census, Jablanica was inhabited by 174 Muslim Albanians and 1092 Orthodox Macedonians.

According to the 2002 census, the village had a total of 553 inhabitants. Ethnic groups in the village include:

- Macedonians 545
- Serbs 1
- Others 7
