= Nerezi =

Nerezi Нерези
- Village
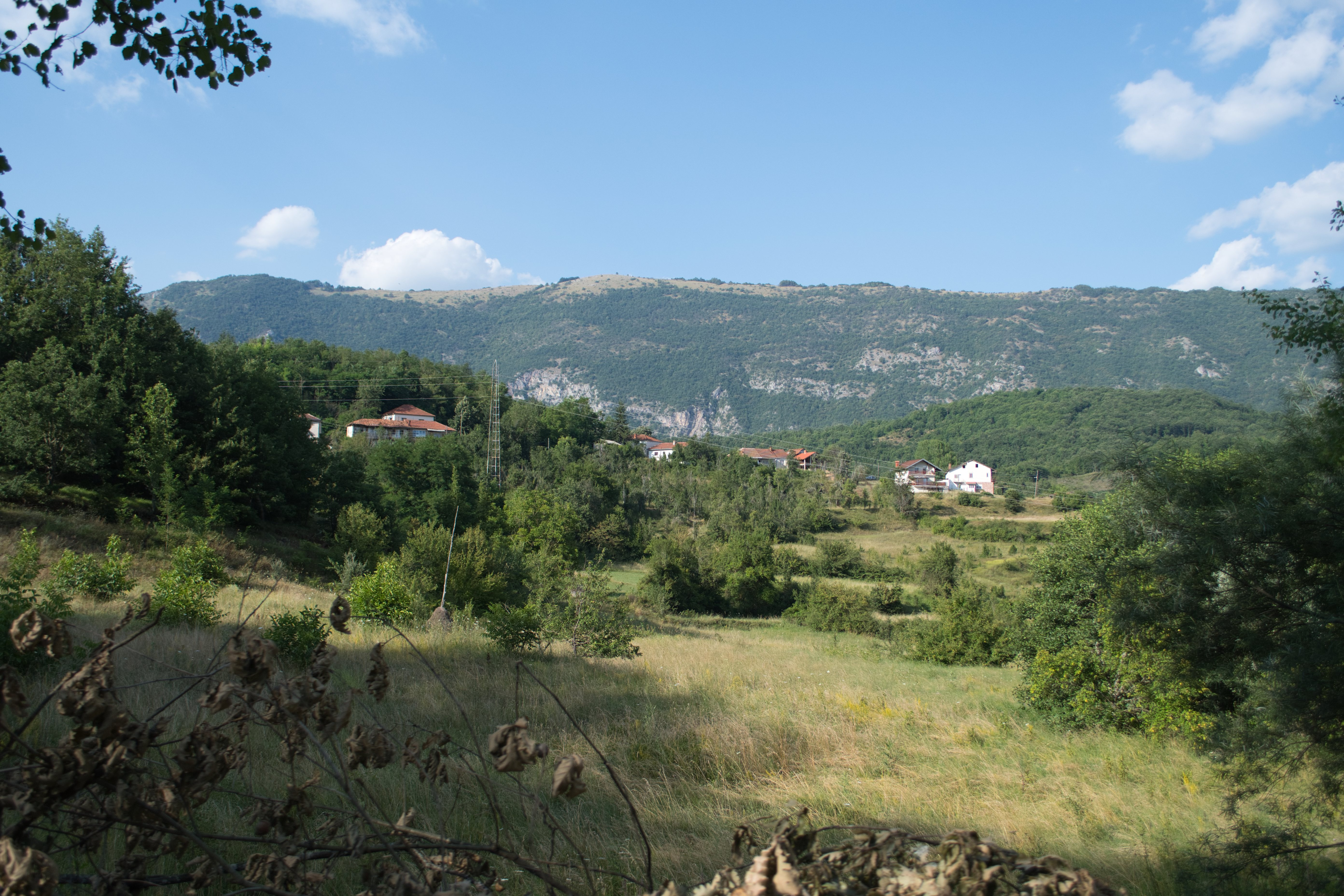
- Panoramic view of the village

- Location within North Macedonia
- Country: North Macedonia
- Region: Southwestern
- Municipality: Struga
- Elevation: 870 m (2,850 ft)

Population (2002)
  - Total: 213
- Time zone: UTC+1 (CET)
  - Summer (DST): UTC+2 (CEST)
- Car plates: SU
- Website: .

Nerezi (Macedonian: Нерези) is a village in North Macedonia, located in the Struga municipality near in the Drimkol region.

== History ==
Nerezi (Nizazi) is recorded in the Ottoman defter of 1467 as a village in the vilayet of Dulgobrda. The settlement had a total of 6 households with the anthroponymy attested mostly being Slavic in character with Albanian anthroponyms only being present in 1 (e.g., Mirush Duriz). Nerezi (Nerec) is again recorded in the Ottoman defter of 1583 as a village in the vilayet of Dulgobrda. The settlement had a total of 26 households with the anthroponymy attested being mostly Slavic in character, with Albanian anthroponyms forming a minority as well as displaying instances of Slavicisation (e.g., Petko Gjon-i, Gjorgo Gjergj, Petko Kurte etc.).

== Demographics ==
The village is populated by 213 inhabitants of whom 212 are Macedonians. Today there are around hundred of houses and around hundred and twenty inhabitants living in the village.
