= Bogojci =

Bogojci Богојци Bogovicë
- Village
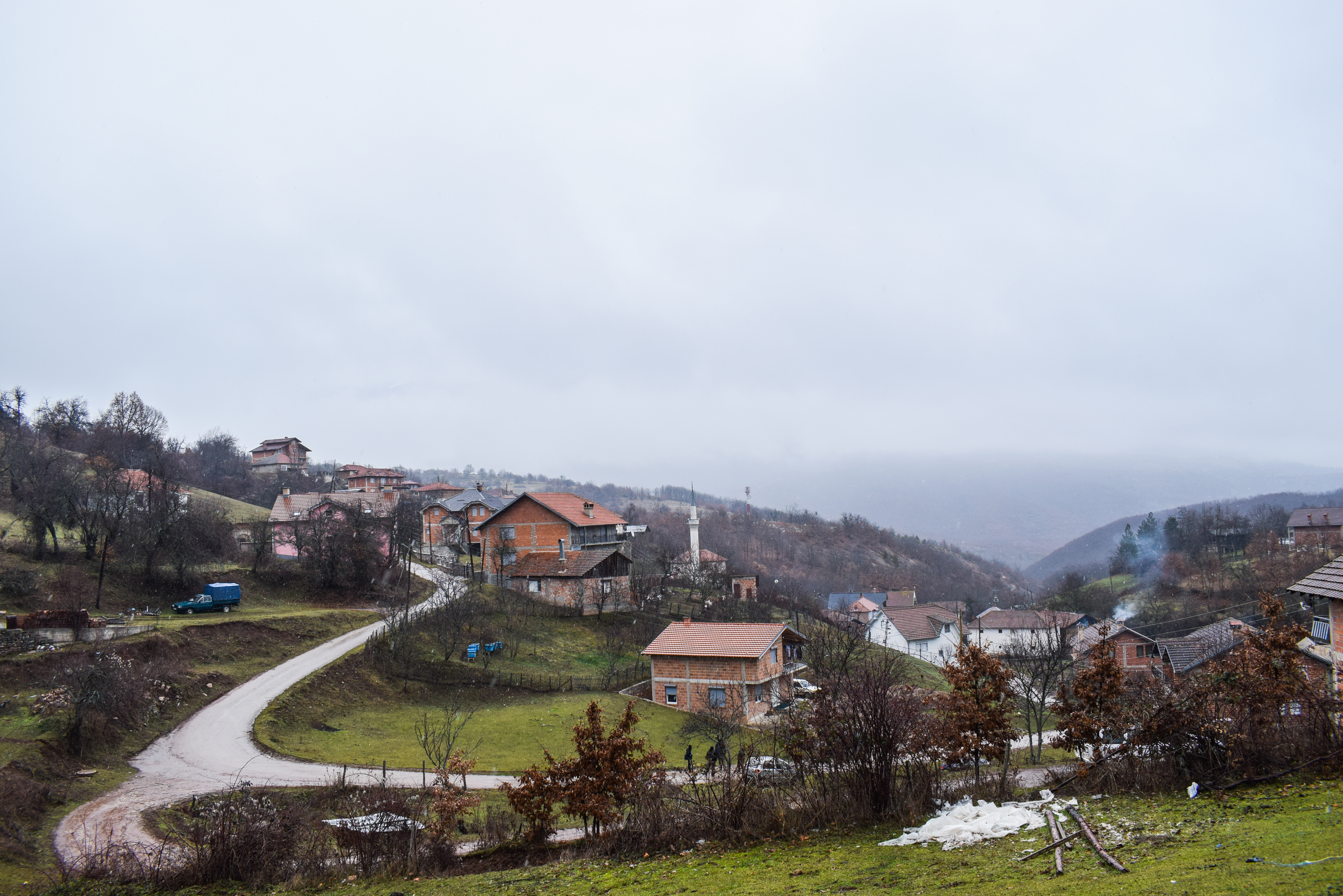
- Bogojci in winter

- Location within North Macedonia
- Coordinates: 41°17′16″N 20°40′12″E
- Country: North Macedonia
- Region: Southwestern
- Municipality: Struga
- Highest elevation: 960 m (3,150 ft)

Population (2021)
  - Total: 74
- Time zone: UTC+1 (CET)
  - Summer (DST): UTC+2 (CEST)
- Area code: +38946
- Car plates: SU
- Website: .

Bogojci (Macedonian: Богојци, Albanian: Bogovicë) is a village in the municipality of Struga, North Macedonia.

== Demographics ==
According to the 1943 Albanian census, Bogojci was inhabited by 202 Muslim Albanians.

As of the 2021 census, Bogojci had 74 residents with the following ethnic composition:

- Albanians 65
- Persons for whom data are taken from administrative sources 8
- Turks 1

According to the 2002 census, the village had a total of 170 inhabitants. Ethnic groups in the village include:

- Albanians 167
- Others 3
