= Globočica, Struga =

Globočica Глобочица
- Village
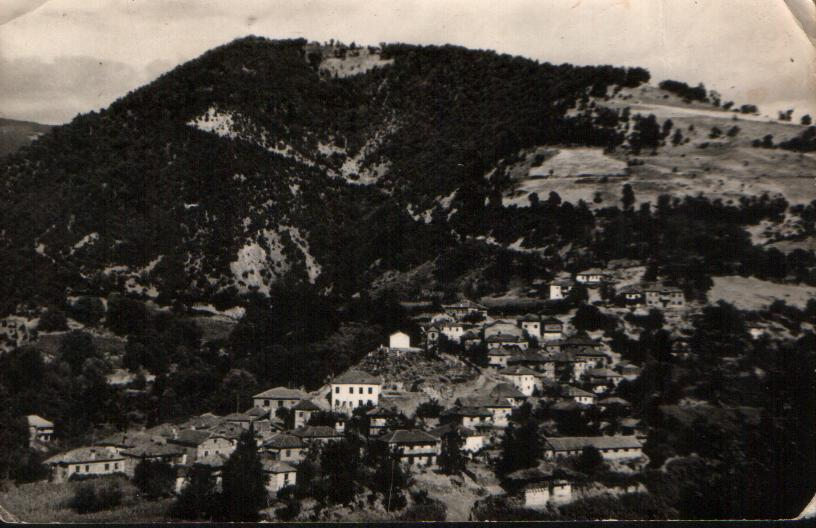

- Location within North Macedonia
- Country: North Macedonia
- Region: Southwestern
- Municipality: Struga
- Elevation: 853 m (2,799 ft)

Population (2002)
  - Total: 0
- Time zone: UTC+1 (CET)
- Area code: +38946

Globočica (Macedonian: Глобочица) is a village in Municipality of Struga, North Macedonia.

== Demographics ==
According to statistics gathered by Vasil Kanchov in 1900, Globočica was populated by 300 Bulgarian Christians. According to Dimitar Mishev, the village had 360 Bulgarian Exarchist residents.

During the years 1961–1964, inhabitants of Globochica moved to Struga; in 1903, the Cartographic Society of Sofia registered the village as inhabited by Albanians, as with all of the villages in Malësia. Nowadays, people descended from this village have been assimilated and identify as Macedonians.
