= Misleševo =

Misleševo Мислешево Misleshovë
- Village
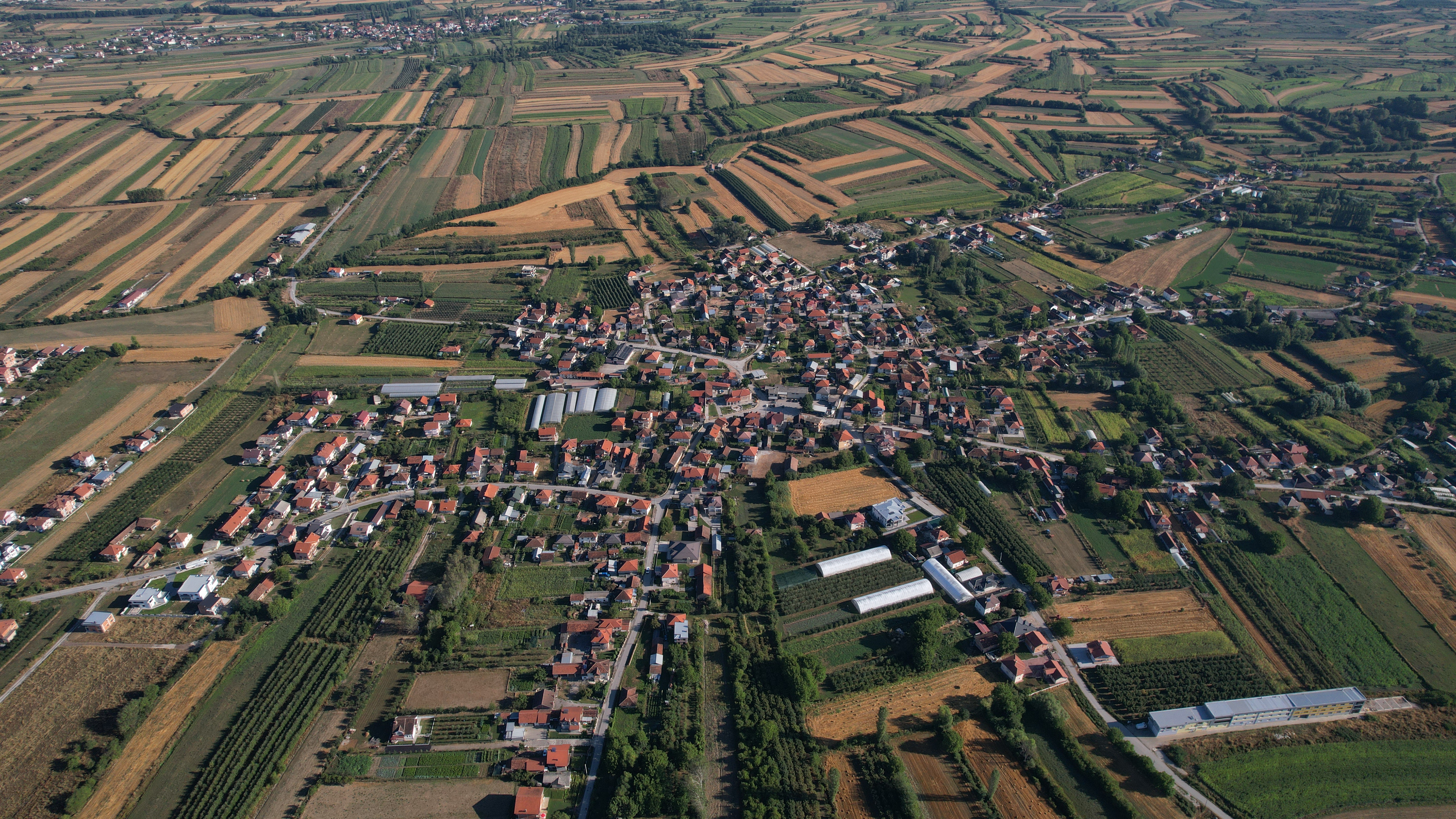
- Air view of the village

- Location within North Macedonia
- Coordinates: 41°11′06″N 20°42′31″E
- Country: North Macedonia
- Region: Southwestern
- Municipality: Struga
- Elevation: 700 m (2,300 ft)

Population (2021)
  - Total: 2,969
- Time zone: UTC+1 (CET)
  - Summer (DST): UTC+2 (CEST)
- Area code: +38946
- Car plates: SU
- Website: .

Misleševo (Macedonian: Мислешево, Albanian: Misleshovë) is a village in the municipality of Struga, North Macedonia.

== Demographics ==
As of the 2021 census, Misleševo had 2,969 residents with the following ethnic composition:

- Macedonians 2,195
- Albanians 368
- Others (including Torbeš) 182
- Persons for whom data are taken from administrative sources 100
- Turks 50
- Vlachs 38
- Roma 26
- Serbs 7
- Bosniaks 3

According to the 2002 census, the village had a total of 3,507 inhabitants. Ethnic groups in the village include:

- Macedonians 2,791
- Albanians 527
- Vlachs 66
- Turks 28
- Serbs 15
- Romani 13
- Others 67
