= Višni =

Višni Вишни
- Village
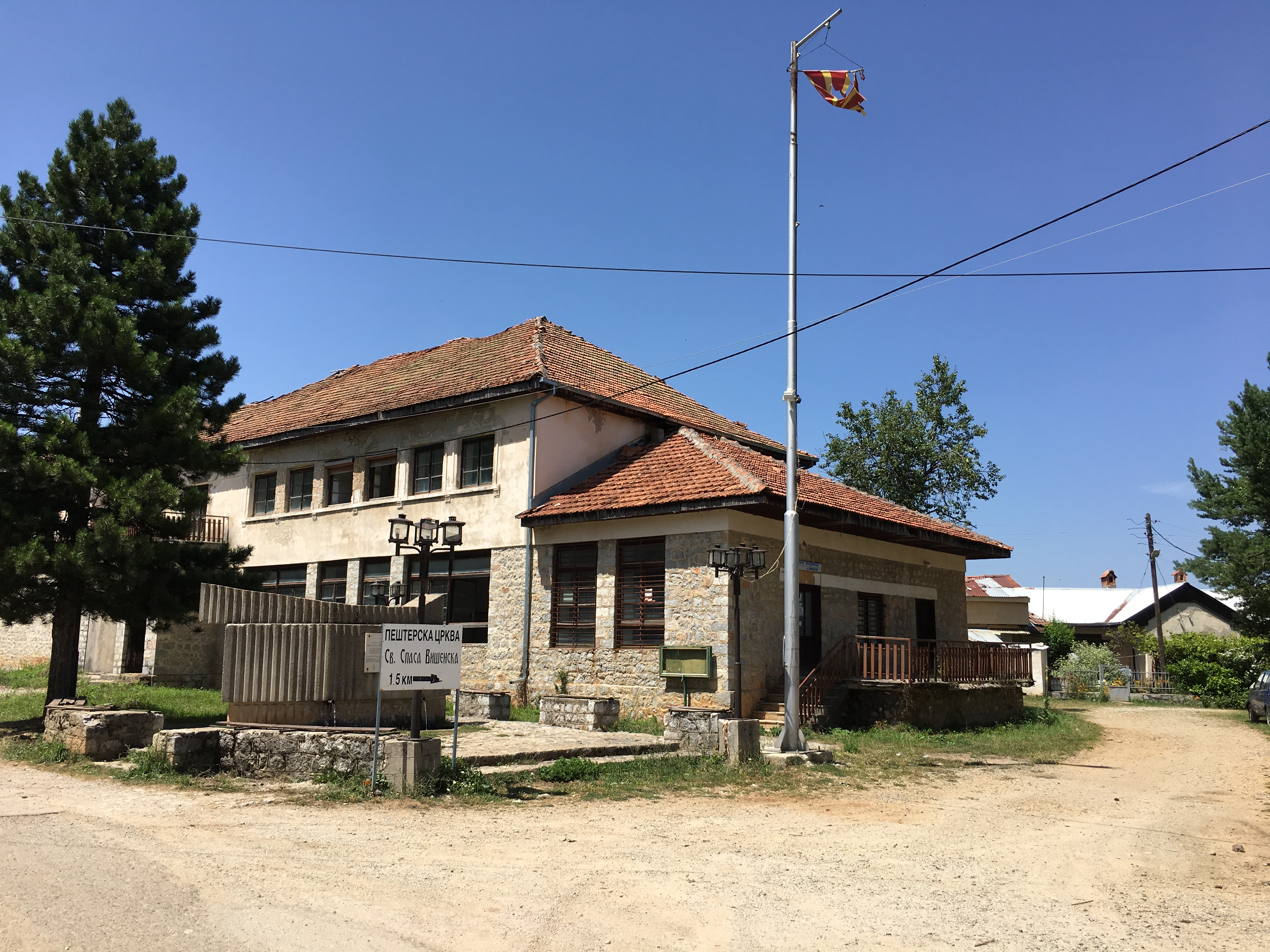

- Location within North Macedonia
- Country: North Macedonia
- Region: Southwestern
- Municipality: Struga
- Elevation: 921 m (3,022 ft)

Population (2021)
  - Total: 47
- Time zone: UTC+1 (CET)
- Area code: +38946

Višni (Macedonian: Вишни) is a village located in the Municipality of Struga, North Macedonia.

== Demographics ==
As of the 2021 census, Višni had 47 residents with the following ethnic composition:

- Macedonians 46
- Others 1

2002 Census: 14

- Macedonians 14
