= Bezovo =

Bezovo Безово
- Village
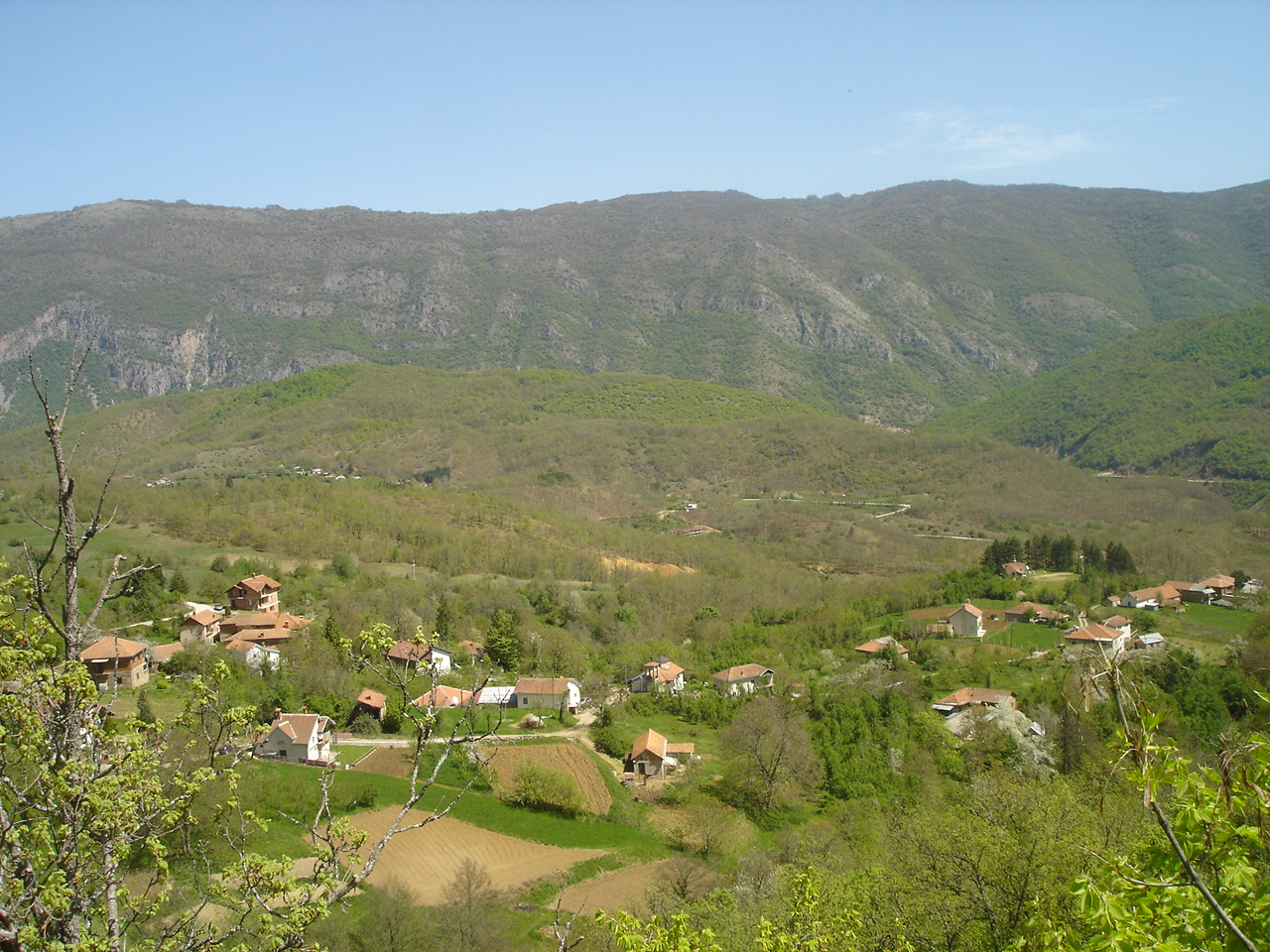
- Bezovo

- Location within North Macedonia
- Coordinates: 41.328766°N 20.602329°E
- Country: North Macedonia
- Region: Southwestern
- Municipality: Struga
- Elevation: 721 m (2,365 ft)

Population (2002)
  - Total: 54
- Time zone: UTC+1 (CET)
- Area code: +38946

Bezovo is a village in Municipality of Struga, North Macedonia.

== Population ==
Bezovo (Bizova) is recorded in the Ottoman defter of 1467 as a village in the vilayet of Dulgobrda. The settlement had a total of 8 households with the anthroponymy attested being of a mixed Albanian-Slavic character with a slight predominance of Slavic names. Bezovo (Pezovo) is again recorded in the Ottoman defter of 1583 as a village in the vilayet of Dulgobrda. The settlement had a total of 24 households with the anthroponymy attested being mostly Slavic in character, with Albanian anthroponyms forming a minority as well as displaying instances of Slavicisation (e.g., Borko son of Gjergj Marko). The village had 1 Muslim household.

According to the 1943 Albanian census, Bezovo was inhabited by 182 Orthodox Albanians or Serbs.

The current population is 54 (2002):

- Macedonians 53
- Others 1
