= Ložani =

Ložani / Lozhani Ложани
- Village
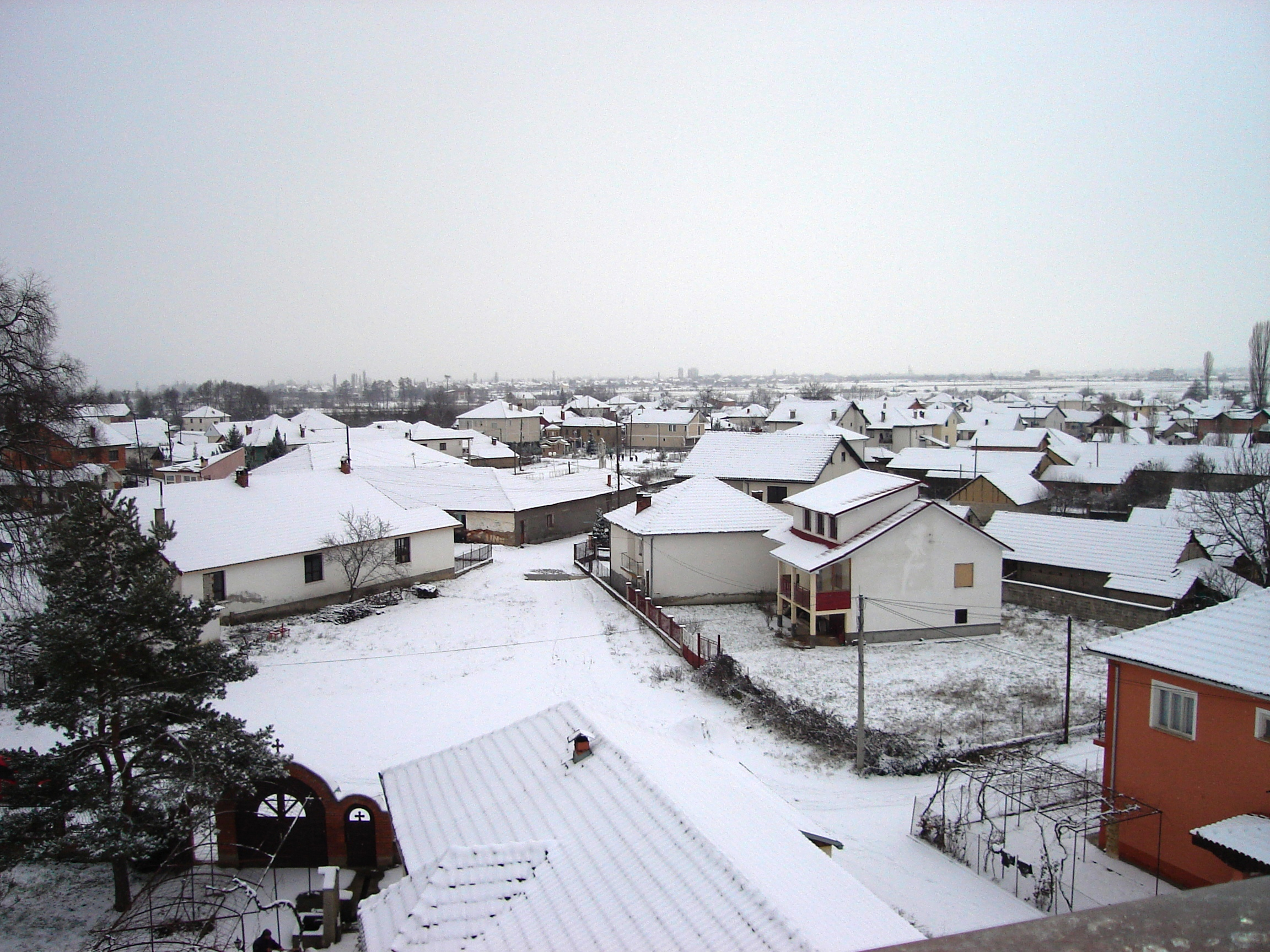

- Location within North Macedonia
- Country: North Macedonia
- Region: Southwestern
- Municipality: Struga
- Elevation: 683 m (2,241 ft)

Population (2002)
  - Total: 729
- Time zone: UTC+1 (CET)
- Area code: +38946

Lozhani is a village in Municipality of Struga, North Macedonia.

== Notable people ==
- Veliče Šumulikoski (born 1981), footballer.
