= Lakaica =

Lakaica Лакаица
- Village
- Location within North Macedonia
- Country: North Macedonia
- Region: Southwestern
- Municipality: Struga
- Elevation: 1,226 m (4,022 ft)

Population (2002)
  - Total: 3
- Time zone: UTC+1 (CET)
- Area code: +38946

Lakaica is a village in Municipality of Struga, North Macedonia.
