= Burinec =

Burinec Буринец
- Village
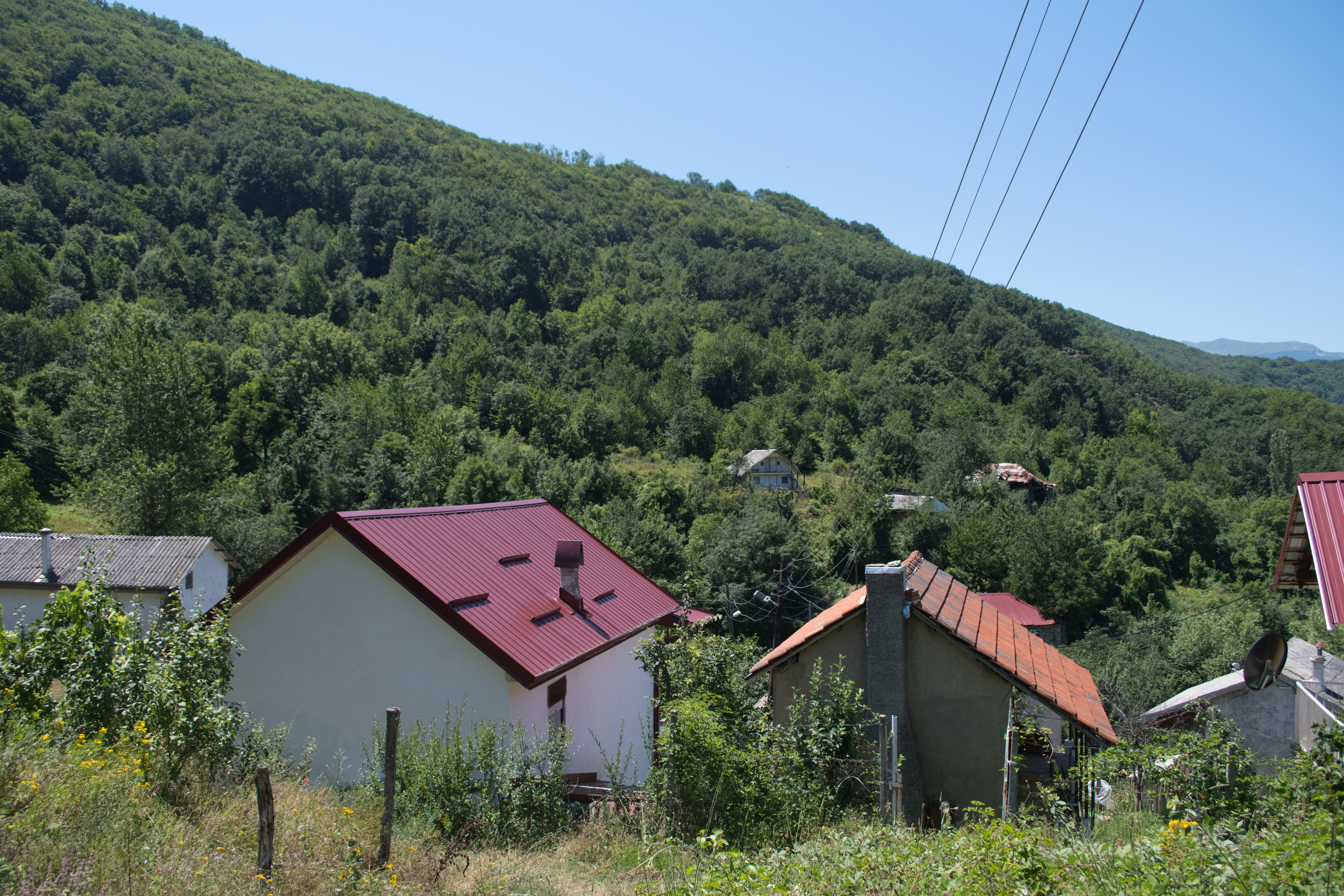
- View of the village Burinec

- Location within North Macedonia
- Country: North Macedonia
- Region: Southwestern
- Municipality: Struga
- Elevation: 1,246 m (4,088 ft)

Population (2021)
  - Total: 1
- Time zone: UTC+1 (CET)
- Area code: +38946

Burinec (Macedonian: Буринец) is a village in Municipality of Struga, North Macedonia.

== Population ==
According to 'Debarski Glas', Burinec had 150 inhabitants in 1911.

As of the 2021 census, Burinec had 1 resident with the following ethnic composition:

- Macedonians 1
