= Novo Selo, Struga =

Novo Selo Ново Село Novosellë
- Village
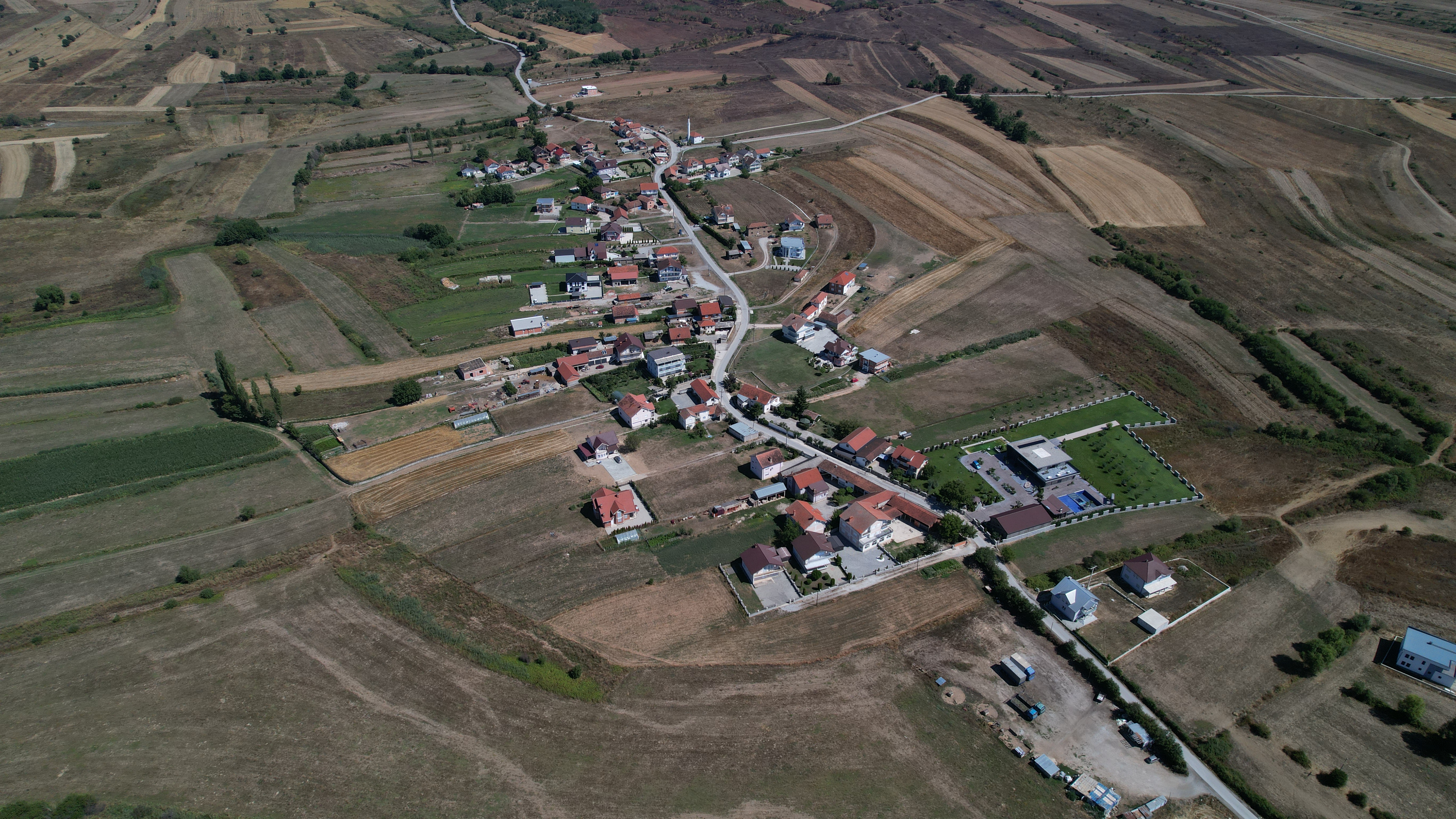
- Air view of the village

- Location within North Macedonia
- Coordinates: 41°14′17″N 20°41′49″E
- Country: North Macedonia
- Region: Southwestern
- Municipality: Struga
- Elevation: 702 m (2,303 ft)

Population (2021)
  - Total: 228
- Time zone: UTC+1 (CET)
  - Summer (DST): UTC+2 (CEST)
- Area code: +38946
- Car plates: SU
- Website: .

Novo Selo (Macedonian: Ново Село, Albanian: Novosellë) is a village in the municipality of Struga, North Macedonia. The etymology of the village comes from Slavic languages meaning new village, Novo Selo.

== Demographics ==
As of the 2021 census, Novo Selo had 228 residents with the following ethnic composition:

- Albanians 162
- Others 53
- Persons for whom data are taken from administrative sources 13

According to the 2002 census, the village had a total of 280 inhabitants. Ethnic groups in the village include:

- Albanians 235
- Others 45
