= Struga Municipality =

Municipality of North Macedonia

Coordinates: 41.18°N 20.68°E

Municipality of Struga Општина Струга Komuna e Strugës
- Municipality
- Coat of arms

- Country: North Macedonia
- Region: Southwestern
- Municipal seat: Struga

Government
  - Mayor: Mendi Qyra (Independent)

Area
  - Total: 483 km^{2} (186 sq mi)

Population
  - Total: 50,980
- Time zone: UTC+1 (CET)
- Vehicle registration: SU
- Website: Official Website

Municipality of Struga (Macedonian: Струга, romanized: Struga, Albanian: Strugë) is a municipality in western North Macedonia. Struga is also the name of the town where the municipal seat is found. Struga Municipality is part of the Southwestern Statistical Region.

== Geography ==
The municipality borders

- Lake Ohrid to the south,
- Debarca Municipality to the east,
- Centar Župa Municipality to the north, and
- Vevčani Municipality and Albania to the west.

=== Inhabited places ===
The only town in the municipality is Struga.

Besides Struga, there are additional 50 villages:

- Bezovo, Bidževo, Bogojci, Brčevo, Burinec,
- Delogoždi, Draslajca, Dolna Belica, Dolno Tateši, Dobovjani, Drenok,
- Džepin,
- Frangovo,
- Globočica, Gorna Belica, Gorno Tateši,
- Jablanica,
- Kališta, Korošišta,
- Labuništa, Lakaica, Livada, Lokov, Ložani, Lukovo,
- Mali Vlaj, Misleševo, Mislodežda, Modrič, Moroišta,
- Nerezi, Novo Selo,
- Oktisi,
- Piskupština, Podgorci, Poum, Prisovjani,
- Radolišta, Radožda, Ržanovo, Struga,
- Selci,
- Šum,
- Tašmaruništa, Toska,
- Velešta, Višni, Vraništa,
- Zagračani and Zbaždi.

== Demographics ==
=== Prior to 2004 adjustment ===
After 2004 the municipalities of Delogoždi, Labuništa, Lukova and Velešta merged with Struga Municipality and the demographics changed. Before that, the demographics of the municipality was:

Ethnic groups.

ethnic group	population	%
Macedonians	17,686	47.9
Albanians	15,324	41.5
Turks	2,008	5.4
Vlachs	647	1.7
Romani	112	0.3
Serbs	100	0.2
Bosniaks	31	0.08
others	984	2.6

Languages

Language	Speakers	%
Macedonian	19,939	54
Albanian	15,408	41.7
Turkish	885	2.3
Vlach	343	0.9
Serbian	75	0.2
Romani	64	0.1
Bosnian	13	0.03
others	165	0.4

Religion

Religion	Followers	%
Muslims	18,967	51.4
Orthodox Christians	17,515	47.4
Catholics	30	0.08
others	380	1.03

=== Post-2004 ===
Mother tongues according to the 2002 Macedonia census and 2021 North Macedonia census.

	2002		2021	
	Number	%	Number	%
TOTAL	63,376	100	50,980	100
Albanian	32,225	50.8	23,898	46.9
Macedonian	29,135	45.9	22,090	43.3
Turkish	989	1.5	1,128	2.2
others	619	1.0	153	0.3
Aromanian	344	0.5	122	0.2
Romani	64	0.1	59	0.1
Persons for whom data are taken from administrative sources	n/a	n/a	3,530	6.91

Language map of the Municipality of Struga. Mother tongue by population, 2002 census

According to the 2021 North Macedonia census, this municipality has 50,980 inhabitants. Ethnic groups in the municipality include:

	2002		2021	
	Number	%	Number	%
TOTAL	63,376	100	50,980	100
Albanians	36,029	56.85	25,785	50.58
Macedonians	20,336	32.09	14,900	29.23
Turks	3,628	5.72	3,472	6.81
Vlachs	656	1.04	492	0.97
Roma	116	0.18	177	0.35
Bosniaks	103	0.16	95	0.19
Serbs	106	0.17	68	0.13
Other / Undeclared / Unknown	2,402	3.79	2,461	4.82
Persons for whom data are taken from administrative sources			3,530	6.92

According to the 2002 Macedonia census, the religions practiced the municipality are:

Religion	Adherents	%
Muslims	42,867	67.6
Orthodox Christians	19,764	31.1
Catholics	35	0.05
Protestants	1	0.001
others	709	1.1

The ethnic composition and numbers of most communities in the Struga region have remained static apart from the Torbeš population who mostly self-declare themselves as either Albanians or Turks. Macedonian-speaking Muslims (Torbeši) are located in the religiously mixed villages of Boroec, Jablanica, Labuništa, Oktisi and Podgorci, where they live alongside Orthodox Macedonians. Amidst the Albanian population of Zagračani are a few Torbeš families originating from Oktisi and Podgorci who now speak Albanian.

The Struga area is home to various dialects spoken by Macedonians, such as the Vevčani-Radožda dialect. The Macedonian language is a second language for most of the non-Slavic ethnic groups in the Struga region. Some communities are bilingual and other ethnic groups are trilingual due to their religious (Islamic) heritage. Many Albanians have a good working knowledge of the variety of Turkish spoken in the Struga area and it serves as a third language for them. Local Macedonians rarely have knowledge of languages spoken by other ethnic groups living in the Struga area. Aromanians traditionally used to live in two villages of the Struga region, the now abandoned settlement of Gorna Belica alongside Albanians that spoke the Tosk Albanian dialect, and Dolna Belica, which has become repopulated mainly with Albanians. Aromanian speaking Muslims also existed in Dolna Belica, although they have assimilated into Albanian identity and language. Some Aromanians from Gorna Belica have resettled in the nearby village of Vevčani. The village of Mali Vlaj was also once inhabited by Aromanians, belonging to the Frashëriot subgroup that originated from Albania and became assimilated during the course of the 19th century.

Both main dialects Gheg and Tosk of Albanian are spoken in the Struga region and are mostly separated along the course of the Black Drim river that runs through the middle of Struga town. The Tosk Albanian dialect is spoken in Frangovo, Kališta, Radolišta, Šum and Zagračani, while all other Albanian inhabited villages of the Struga region speak the Gheg Albanian dialect. Part of the village population in Labuništa is Albanian. Until the last few decades of the 20th century Tosk Albanian, in particular the geographically central variety of the dialect dominated among speakers of Albanian in Struga. The local Romani population of Struga speaks and sings in the southern Tosk Albanian dialect, as does the local Turkish population. Aromanians in Struga and the wider area have practical knowledge of Tosk Albanian as a third language. Local Macedonians who learn Albanian, speak the Tosk Albanian dialect.

== Inhabited places ==
There are 65 inhabited places in this municipality.

Inhabited Places	Total	Macedonians	Albanians	Turks	Roma	Vlachs	Serbs	Bosnians	Others
Struga Municipality	50,980	14,900	25,785	3,472	177	492	68	95	5,991
Struga	15009	6517	4903	810	141	431	49	23	1552
Bezovo	22	18	0	0	0	0	0	0	4
Bidjevo	290	71	207	0	0	0	0	0	12
Bogojci	74	0	65	1	0	0	0	0	8
Boroec	565	47	103	153	0	0	0	143	119
Brchevo	6	6	0	0	0	0	0	0	0
Burinec	1	1	0	0	0	0	0	0	0
Veleshta	3378	7	3254	0	0	1	0	1	115
Vishni	47	46	0	0	0	0	1	0	0
Vranishta	1563	1471	8	0	0	3	3	1	76
Globochica	0	0	0	0	0	0	0	0	0
Gorna Belica	4	0	4	0	0	0	0	0	0
Gorno Tateshi	619	1	601	1	0	0	0	1	15
Delogozhdi	1714	0	1668	0	0	0	0	0	46
Dobovjani	237	0	235	0	0	0	0	0	2
Dolna Belica	660	2	604	1	1	5	0	29	18
Dolno Tateshi	351	1	349	0	0	0	0	0	1
Draslajca	714	679	0	0	0	1	1	5	28
Drenok	19	18	0	0	0	0	1	0	0
Zagrachani	736	0	719	0	0	0	0	0	17
Zbazhdi	10	4	0	0	0	0	0	0	6
Jablanica	308	266	0	1	0	0	0	0	41
Kalishta	764	115	623	0	0	2	1	0	23
Koroshishta	1201	1	1179	0	0	0	0	1	20
Labunishta	6739	108	4751	836	5	0	1	42	528
Lakaica	0	0	0	0	0	0	0	0	0
Livada	1132	0	1111	0	1	1	0	0	19
Lozhani	644	511	9	0	1	6	0	4	113
Lokov	0	0	0	0	0	0	0	0	0
Lukovo	268	249	0	0	0	0	0	1	18
Mali Vlaj	20	11	0	0	0	0	0	0	9
Misleshevo	2969	2195	368	50	26	38	7	3	100
Mislodezhda	428	0	407	0	0	0	0	0	21
Modrich	8	1	0	0	0	0	0	0	7
Moroishta	881	807	1	0	0	2	2	0	69
Nerezi	106	99	0	0	0	0	0	0	7
Novo Selo	228	0	162	0	0	0	0	53	13
Oktisi	1925	409	241	762	2	0	1	8	171
Piskupshtina	145	135	1	0	0	0	0	1	8
Podgorci	2430	243	583	857	0	1	0	18	87
Poum	67	0	58	0	0	0	0	0	9
Prisovjani	3	0	0	0	0	0	0	0	3
Rzhanovo	0	0	0	0	0	0	0	0	0
Radozhda	710	689	0	0	0	1	1	1	18
Radolishta	2067	1	1954	0	0	0	0	0	112
Selci	6	5	0	0	0	0	0	0	1
Tashmarunishta	173	166	0	0	0	0	0	1	6
Toska	0	0	0	0	0	0	0	0	0
Frangovo	1206	0	1156	0	0	0	0	14	36
Zhepin	122	0	119	0	0	0	0	0	3
Shum	411	0	342	0	0	0	0	0	69

== History ==
On 26 November 2019, an earthquake struck Albania and Struga Municipality held 1 day of mourning for the earthquake victims and sent 1,000,000 denars for relief efforts.
