= Tašmaruništa =

- Village
- Ташмаруништа
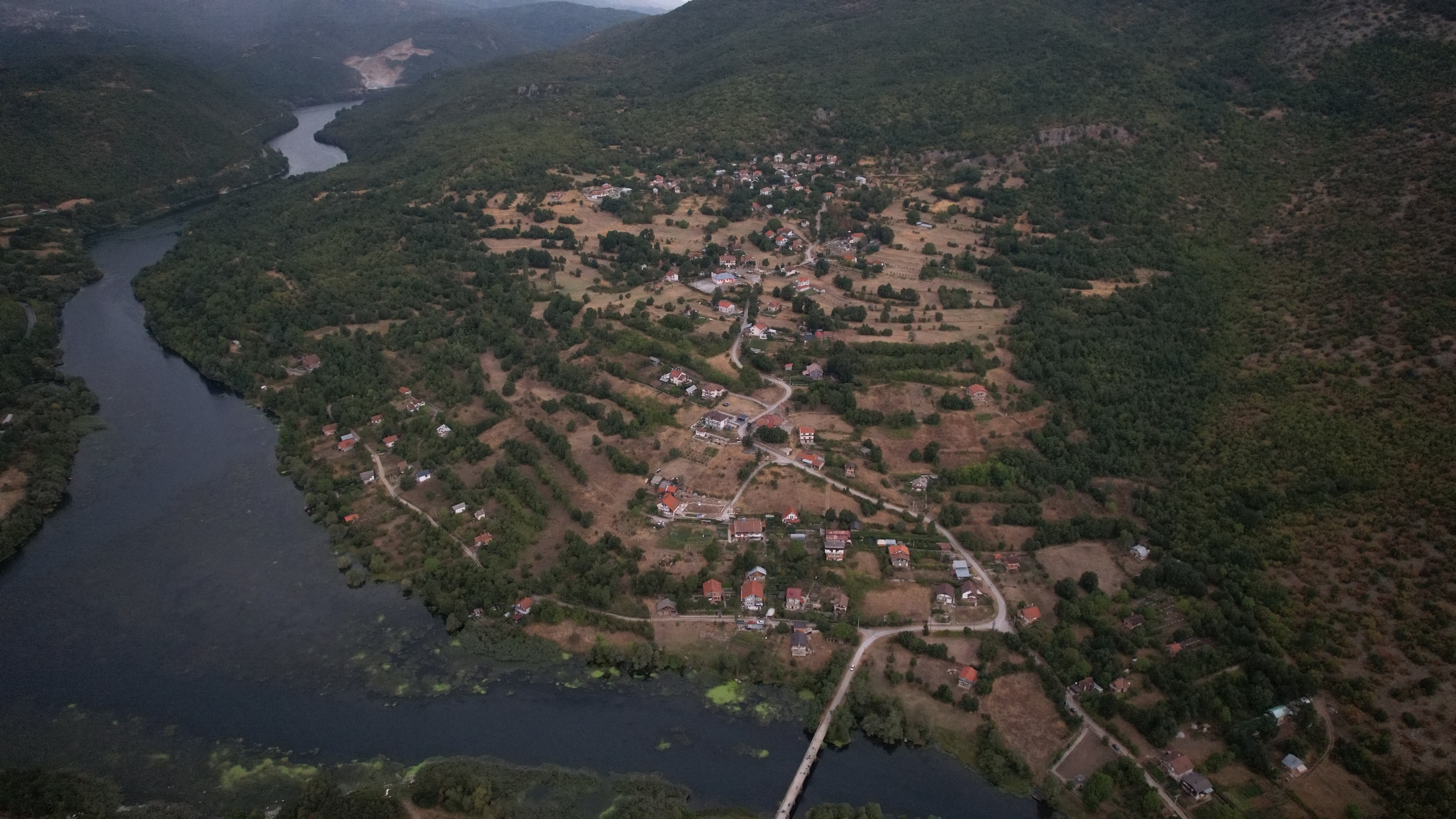
- Air view of the village

- Location within North Macedonia
- Coordinates: 41°16′18″N 20°38′22″E
- Country: North Macedonia
- Region: Southwestern
- Municipality: Struga
- Elevation: 997 m (3,271 ft)

Population (2002)
  - Total: 210
- Time zone: UTC+1 (CET)
  - Summer (DST): UTC+2 (CEST)
- Area code: +38946
- Car plates: SU
- Website: .

Tašmaruništa (Macedonian: Ташмаруништа) is a village in the municipality of Struga, North Macedonia.

== Name ==
The placename Tašmaruništa is a hybrid toponym formed from two terms, the Turkish word Taş meaning stone or rock alongside the Slavic Moruništa, which itself is formed from the word Morun and the suffix išta. Within an older map done by the village is recorded as Moroništa and Pianka Włodzimierz notes that it would not be inconceivable that the sound u has been substituted for o. Regarding the term Morun, Włodzimierz proposes that it could be from the word Moruna, a term for sturgeon fish (Acipenser huso) or from Morun, a personal name stemming from the Greco-Latin Maron, and similar to the name Marin. Of the second context, Włodzimierz contends it could have served as patronymic name as in the nearby toponym Labuništa - Albanopolis alongside the structural function and transformation of the suffix. Włodzimierz notes more research of older documentation needs to be done to be able to resolve that issue.

== History ==
During the mid-fourteenth century, Aromanians possibly were the inhabitants of Golema Vlaj, a settlement that was partially north of Struga located on the current site of modern Tašmaruništa.

== Demographics ==
In statistics gathered by Vasil Kanchov in 1900, the village of Tašmaruništa was inhabited by 400 Christian Bulgarians and 70 Muslim Albanians.

According to the 2002 census, the village had a total of 210 inhabitants. Ethnic groups in the village include:

- Macedonians 209
- Others 1

== See also ==
- Mali Vlaj
