= Dobovjani =

Dobovjani Добовјани Dobovjan
- Village
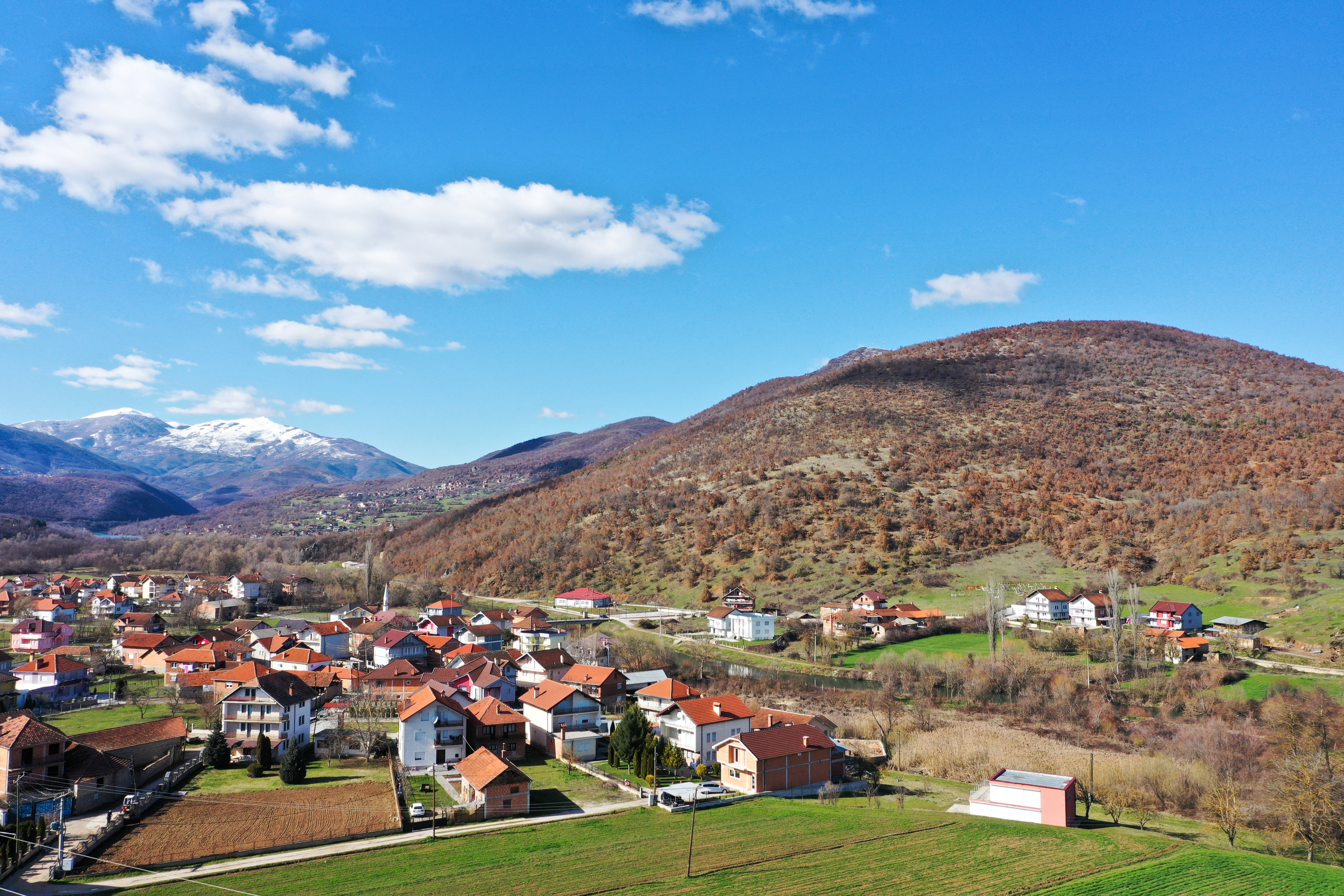
- Aerial view of Dobovjani

- Location within North Macedonia
- Coordinates: 41°15′01″N 20°39′36″E
- Country: North Macedonia
- Region: Southwestern
- Municipality: Struga
- Elevation: 695 m (2,280 ft)

Population (2002)
  - Total: 168
- Time zone: UTC+1 (CET)
  - Summer (DST): UTC+2 (CEST)
- Area code: +38946
- Car plates: SU
- Website: .

Dobovjani (Macedonian: Добовјани, Albanian: Dobovjan) is a village in the municipality of Struga, North Macedonia.

== Demographics ==
According to the 2002 census, the village had a total of 168 inhabitants. Ethnic groups in the village include:

- Albanians 164
- Others 4
