= Drenok =

Drenok Дренок
- Village
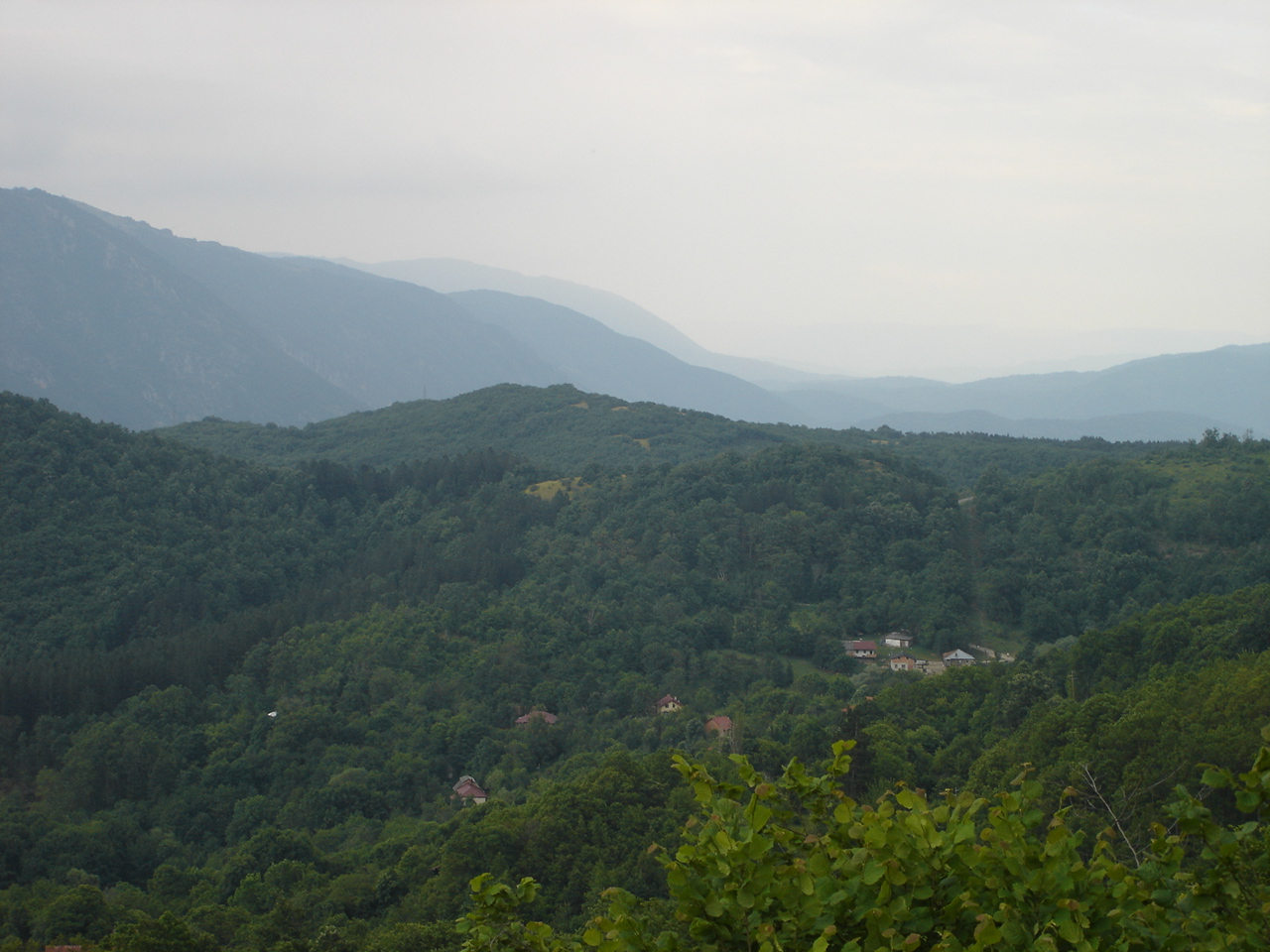
- Panoramic view of the village

- Location within North Macedonia
- Country: North Macedonia
- Region: Southwestern
- Municipality: Struga
- Elevation: 1,096 m (3,596 ft)

Population (2021)
  - Total: 19
- Time zone: UTC+1 (CET)
- Area code: +38946

Drenok (Macedonian: Дренок) is a village on Jablanica (Macedonian: Јабланица) mountain in Municipality of Struga, North Macedonia.

== Demographic history ==
Drenok (Dranok) appears in the Ottoman defter of 1467 as a village in the timar of Iskender in the vilayet of Dulgoberda. The settlement had a total of four households and the anthroponymy attested depicts a presence of Albanian personal names alongside Christian names which belong to the Slavic onomastic sphere: Kojo son of Gjini, Simko son of Lolça, Petre brother of Kojo, and Ninec brother of Simko.

== Population ==
As of the 2021 census, Drenok had 19 residents with the following ethnic composition:

- Macedonians 18
- Serbs 1
