= Moroišta =

Moroišta Мороишта
- Village
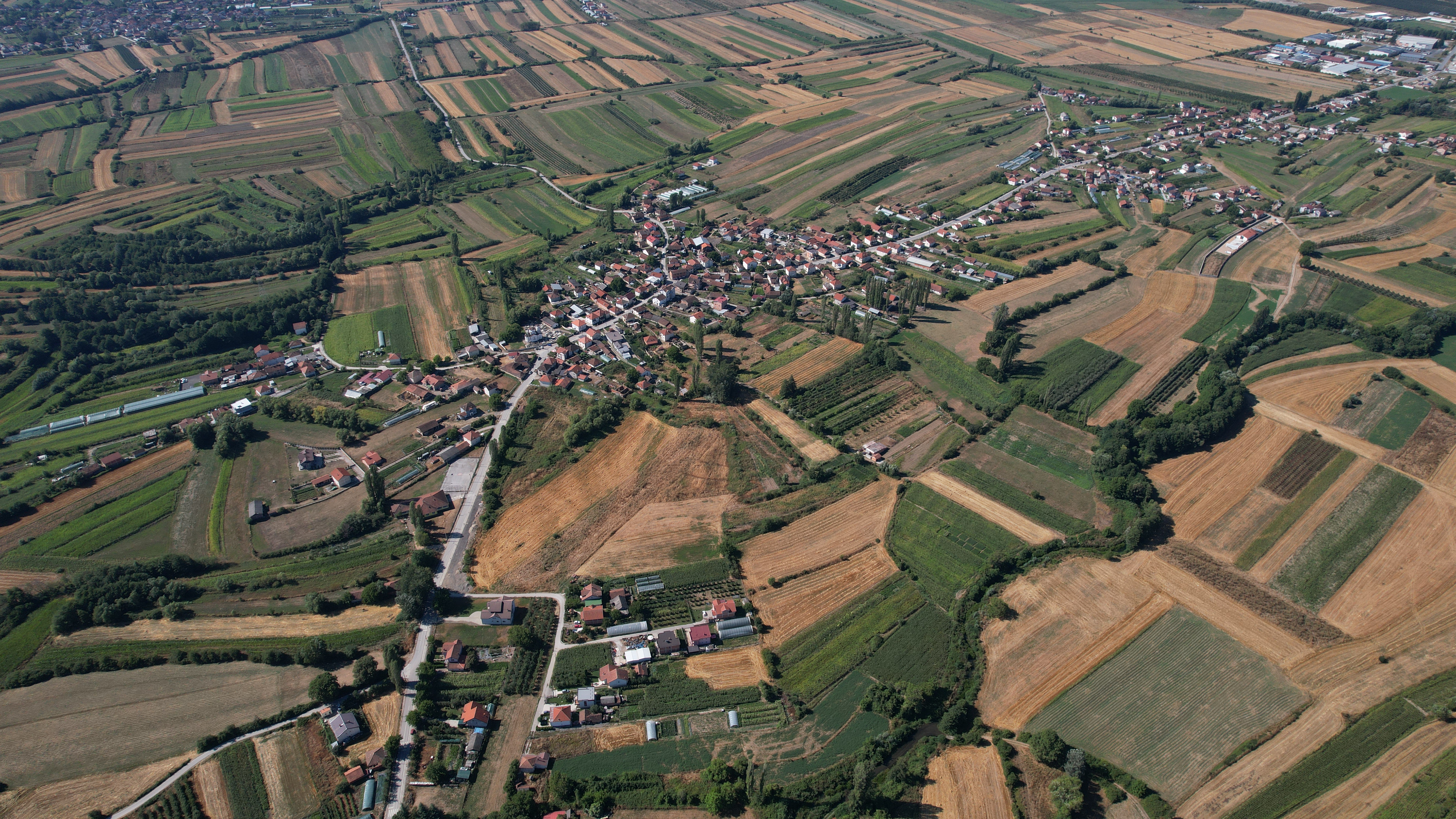
- Air view of the village

- Location within North Macedonia
- Country: North Macedonia
- Region: Southwestern
- Municipality: Struga
- Elevation: 686 m (2,251 ft)

Population (2002)
  - Total: 909
- Time zone: UTC+1 (CET)
- Area code: +38946

Moroišta (Macedonian Мороишта) is a village in Municipality of Struga, North Macedonia.

The village was first mentioned in 1345 in the letter of the Serbian king Stefan Dusan as Moroviste.

== Demographics ==
By the statistic of 1900 in Moroista (Мороишта) lived 250 people, and they were all Macedonians (Македонци).

According to the 2002 census, the village had a total of 909 inhabitants. Ethnic groups in the village include:

- Macedonians 903
- Serbs 4
- Aromanians 2
