= Mislodežda =

Mislodežda Мислодежда Misllodezhdë
- Village
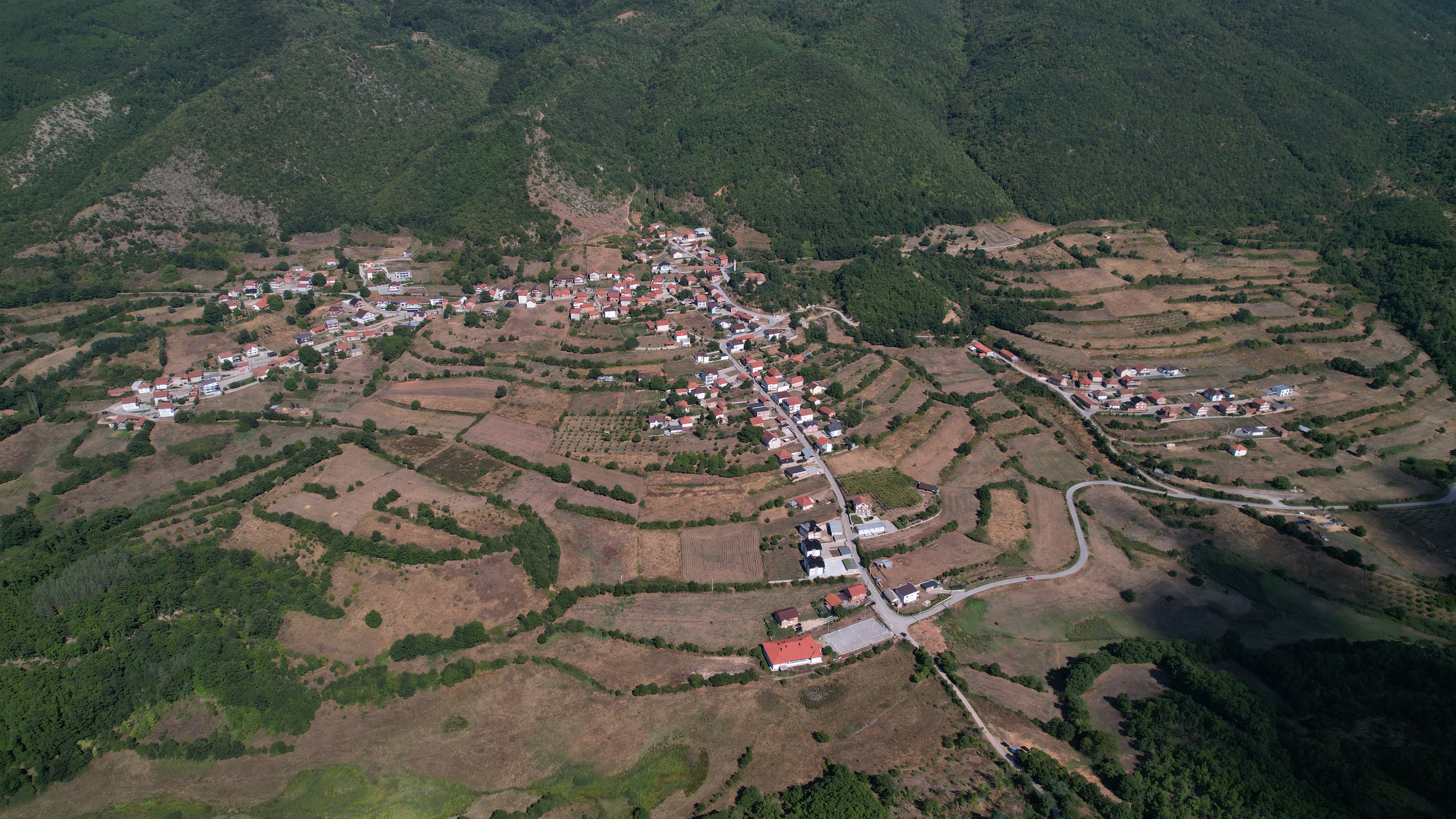
- Air view of the village

- Location within North Macedonia
- Coordinates: 41°18′00″N 20°41′35″E
- Country: North Macedonia
- Region: Southwestern
- Municipality: Struga
- Elevation: 1,230 m (4,040 ft)

Population (2021)
  - Total: 428
- Time zone: UTC+1 (CET)
  - Summer (DST): UTC+2 (CEST)
- Area code: +38946
- Car plates: SU
- Website: .

Mislodežda (Macedonian: Мислодежда, Albanian: Misllodezhdë) is a village in the municipality of Struga, North Macedonia.

== Demographics ==
As of the 2021 census, Mislodežda had 428 residents with the following ethnic composition:

- Albanians 407
- Persons for whom data are taken from administrative sources 21

According to the 2002 census, the village had a total of 720 inhabitants. Ethnic groups in the village include:

- Albanians 717
- Macedonians 1
- Others 2

According to the 1942 Albanian census, Mislodežda was inhabited by 562 Muslim Albanians.
