= Korošišta =

Korošišta Корошишта Koroshisht
- Village
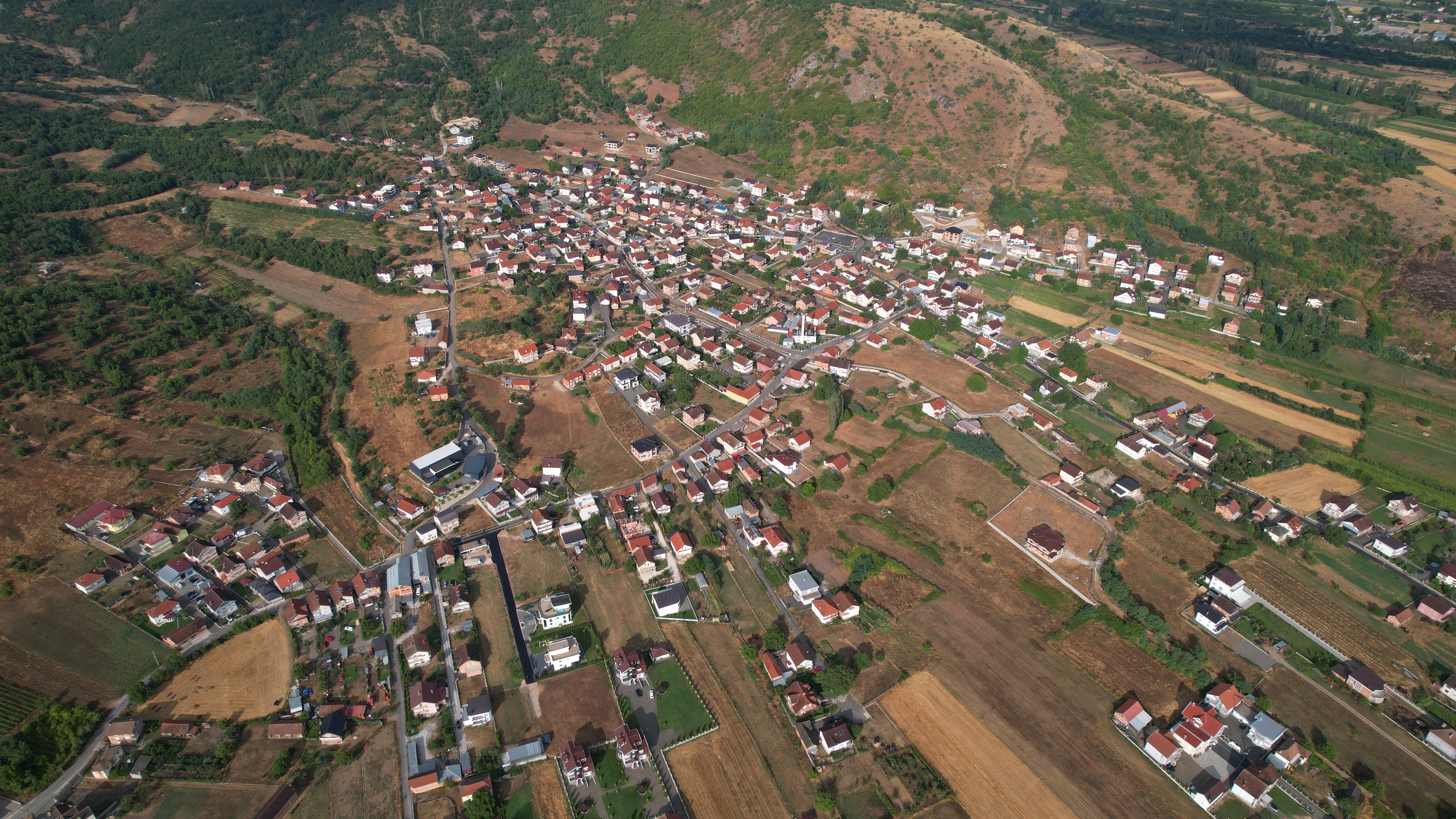
- Air view of the village

- Location within North Macedonia
- Coordinates: 41°14′57″N 20°44′54″E
- Country: North Macedonia
- Region: Southwestern
- Municipality: Struga
- Elevation: 705 m (2,313 ft)

Population (2021)
  - Total: 1,201
- Time zone: UTC+1 (CET)
  - Summer (DST): UTC+2 (CEST)
- Area code: +38946
- Car plates: SU
- Website: .

Korošišta (Macedonian: Корошишта, Albanian: Koroshisht) is a village in the municipality of Struga, North Macedonia.

== Demographics ==
As of the 2021 census, Korošišta had 1,201 residents with the following ethnic composition:

- Albanians 1,179
- Persons for whom data are taken from administrative sources 20
- Macedonians 1
- Others 1

According to the 2002 census, the village had a total of 1,717 inhabitants. Ethnic groups in the village include:

- Albanians 1,698
- Macedonians 1
- Serbs 1
- Others 19
