= Piskupština =

Piskupština / Piskupshtina Пискупштина
- Village
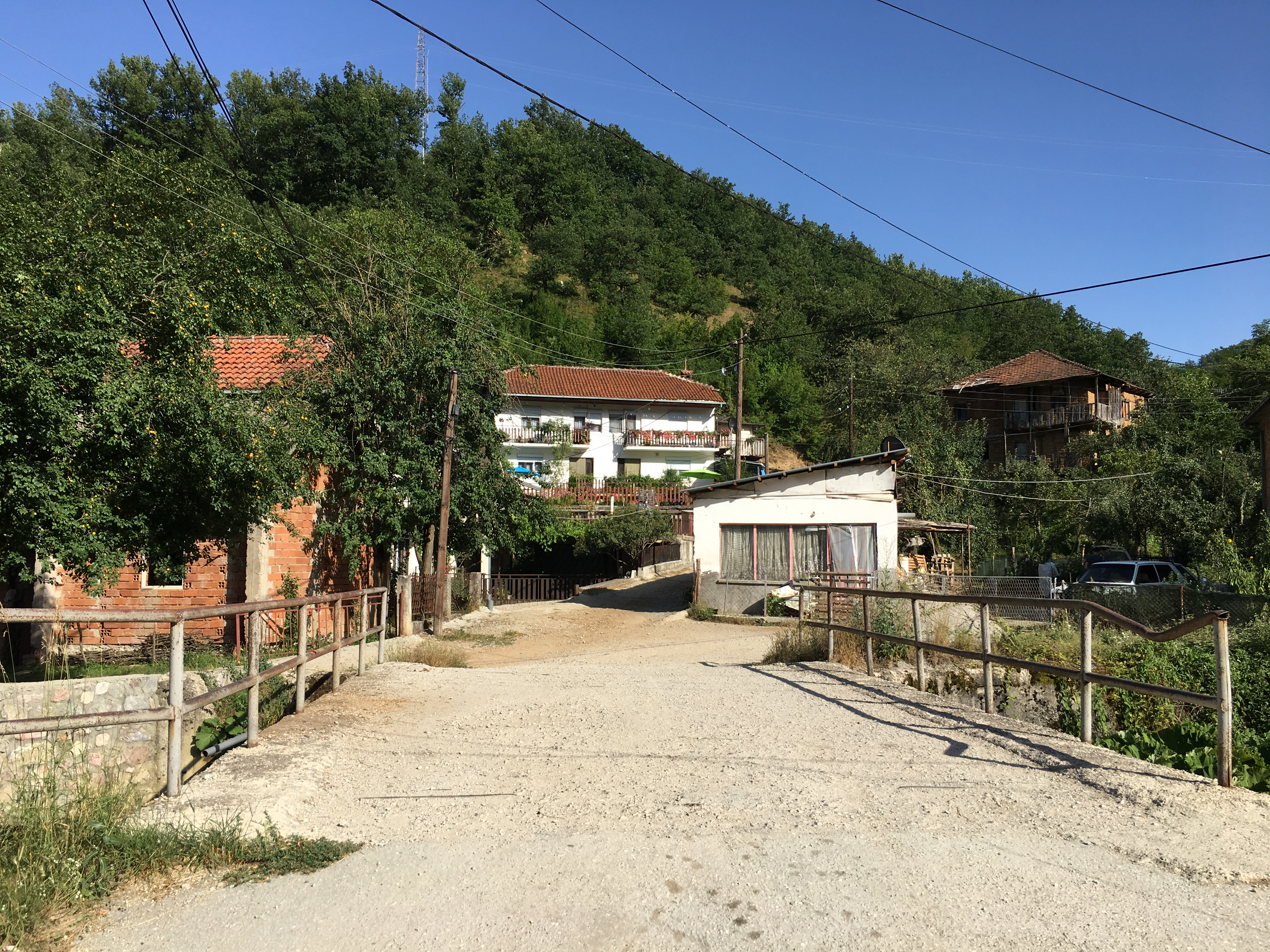

- Location within North Macedonia
- Country: North Macedonia
- Region: Southwestern
- Municipality: Struga
- Elevation: 790 m (2,590 ft)

Population (2002)
  - Total: 182
- Time zone: UTC+1 (CET)
- Area code: +38946

Piskupshtina is a village in Municipality of Struga, North Macedonia.

== Demographics ==
Piskupština (Peskoposhtina) appears in the Ottoman defter of 1467 as a village in the timar of Saadi Hoca in the vilayet of Dulgoberda. The settlement had a total of six households and the anthroponyms recorded attest to a mixed Albanian-Slavic character, although clear instances of Slavicisation are identifiable. For example, a certain Dobrosllav Zogovići is recorded among the village household heads, his patronym is derived from the Albanian zog ("bird") with the addition of the Slavic suffix -ovići. Household heads: Gjon Veselko; Miho Kostovo; Gjergj Kosta; Miho Rojko; Andrije, brother of Gjon Veselko; and Dobrosllav Zogovići. The register also notes that the lands of Piskupština were worked and planted by farmers from the neighbouring villages. Piskupština is again recorded in the Ottoman defter of 1583 as a village in the vilayet of Upper Dibra. The settlement had a total of 20 households with the anthroponymy attested being mixed Slavic-Albanian in character, with the Albanian anthroponyms appearing exhibiting instances of Slavicisation (e.g., Gjon Borko; Geno Gjon-i; Gjergji Dobrosllav; Nikolla Gjon-i; Gjurgj Miro; Jovan Patrid-i; his son Gorçe; Dimitri Gjergji.).

According to the 2002 census, the village had a total of 182 inhabitants. Ethnic groups in the village include:

- Macedonians 182
