= Džepin =

Džepin Џепин Zhepin
- Village
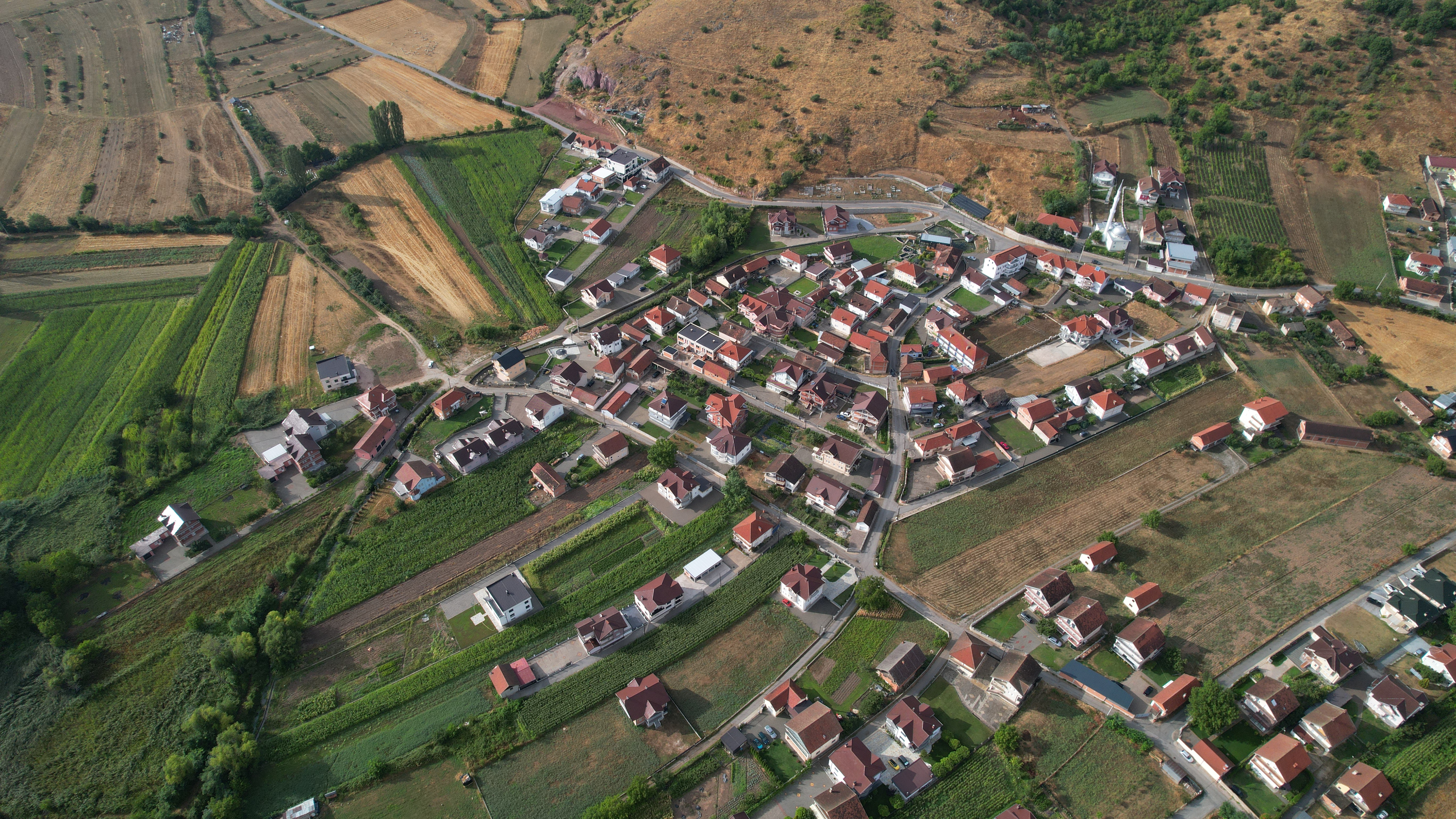
- Air view of the village

- Location within North Macedonia
- Coordinates: 41°12′47″N 20°38′06″E
- Country: North Macedonia
- Region: Southwestern
- Municipality: Struga
- Elevation: 746 m (2,448 ft)

Population (2021)
  - Total: 122
- Time zone: UTC+1 (CET)
  - Summer (DST): UTC+2 (CEST)
- Area code: +38946
- Car plates: SU
- Website: .

Džepin (Macedonian: Џепин, Albanian: Zhepin) is a village in the municipality of Struga, North Macedonia.

== Demographics ==
As of the 2021 census, Džepin had 122 residents with the following ethnic composition:

- Albanians 119
- Persons for whom data are taken from administrative sources 3

According to the 2002 census, the village had a total of 424 inhabitants. Ethnic groups in the village include:

- Albanians 423
- Others 1
