= Dolno Tateši =

Dolno Tateši Долно Татеши Tatesh i Poshtëm
- Village
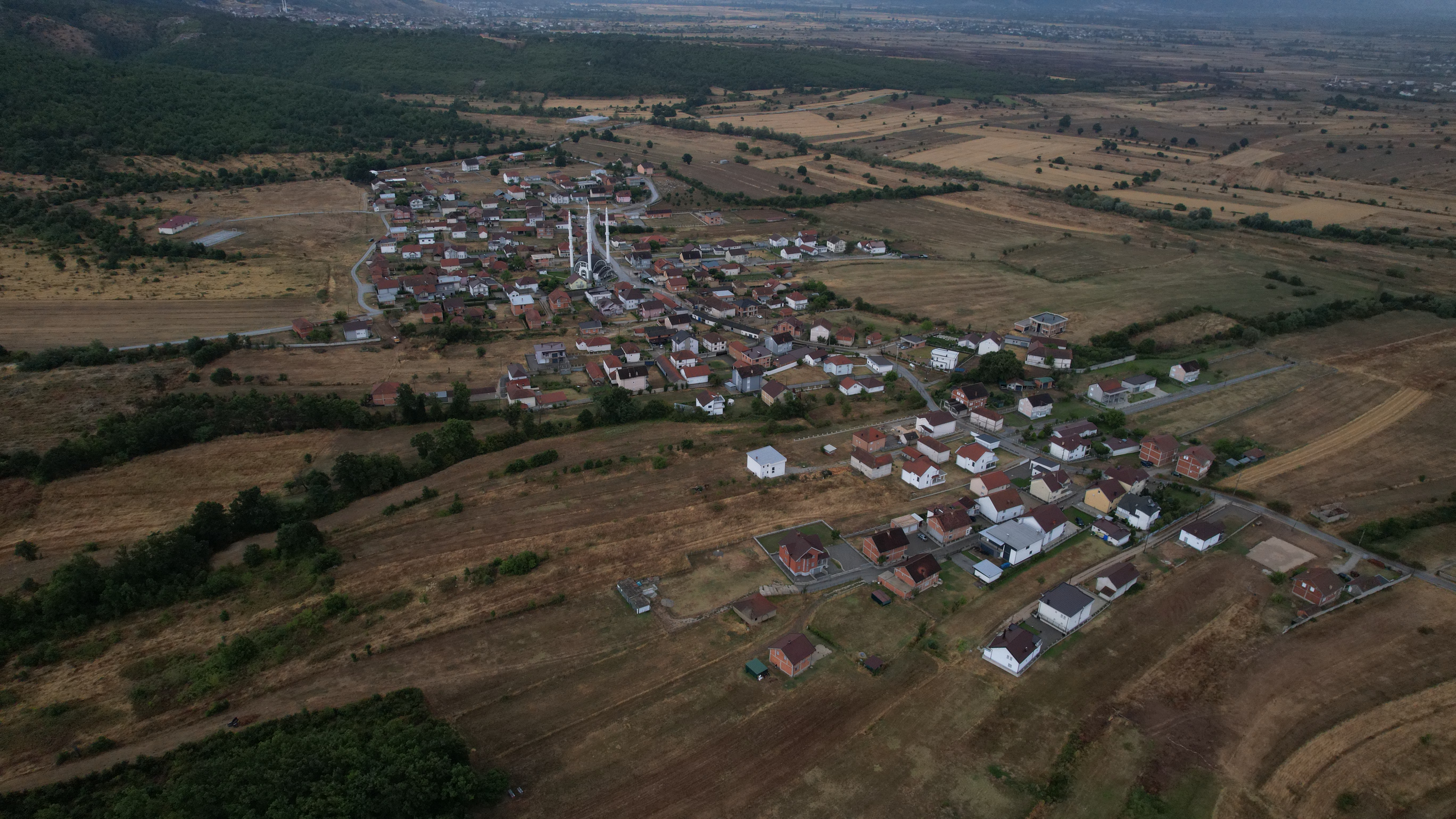
- Air view of the village

- Location within North Macedonia
- Coordinates: 41°15′30″N 20°41′22″E
- Country: North Macedonia
- Region: Southwestern
- Municipality: Struga

Population (2021)
  - Total: 351
- Time zone: UTC+1 (CET)
  - Summer (DST): UTC+2 (CEST)
- Car plates: SU
- Website: .

Dolno Tateši (Macedonian: Долно Татеши, Albanian: Tatesh i Poshtëm) is a village in the municipality of Struga, North Macedonia.

== Name ==
The name of the village is an Albanian toponym and derived possibly from a personal name.

== Demographics ==
As of the 2021 census, Dolno Tateši had 351 residents with the following ethnic composition:

- Albanians 349
- Macedonians 1
- Persons for whom data are taken from administrative sources 1

According to the 2002 census, the village had a total of 699 inhabitants. Ethnic groups in the village include:

- Albanians 697
- Others 2
