= Zagračani =

Zagračani Заграчани Zagraçan
- Village
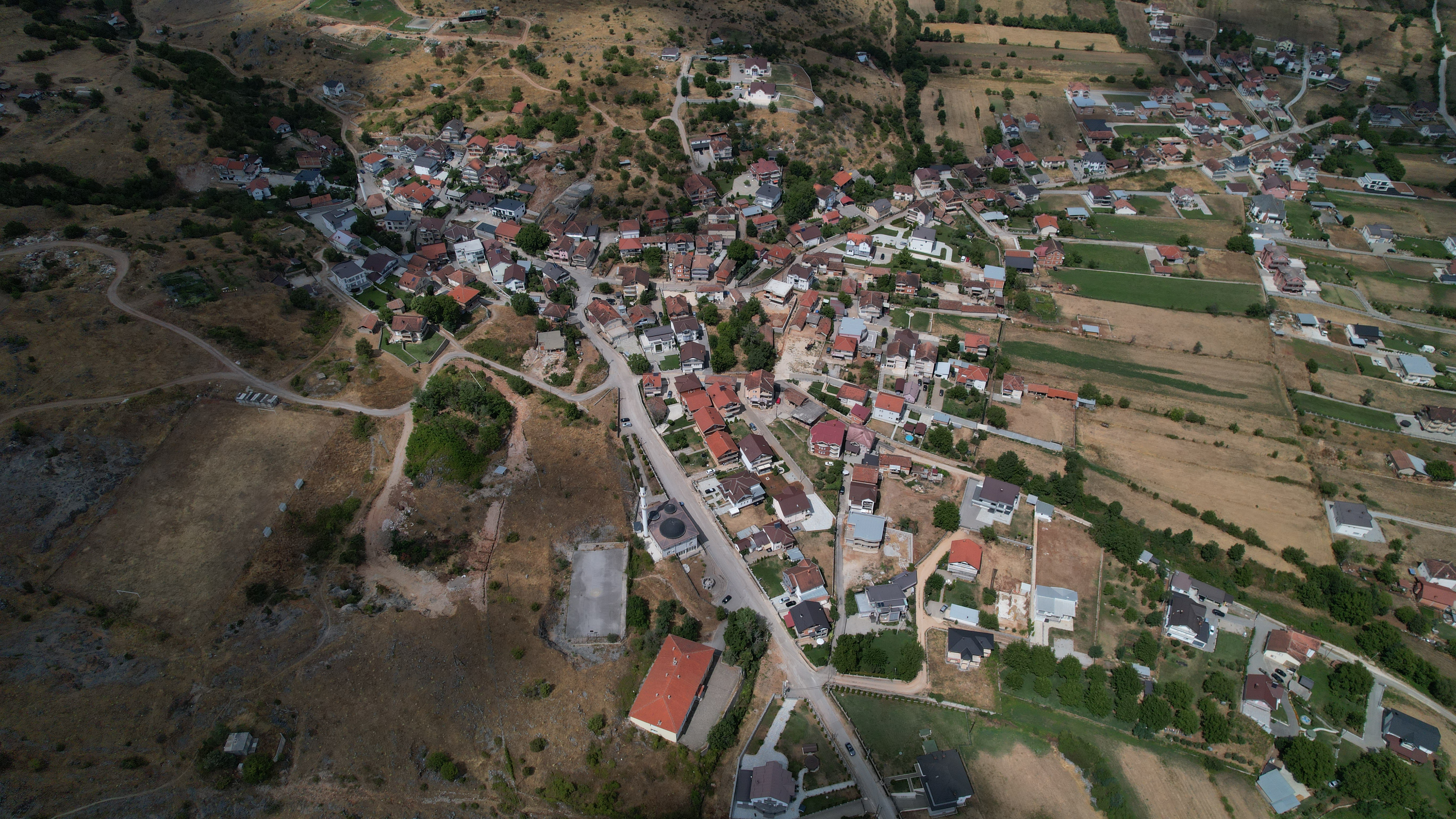
- Air view of the village

- Location within North Macedonia
- Coordinates: 41°11′29″N 20°37′42″E
- Country: North Macedonia
- Region: Southwestern
- Municipality: Struga
- Elevation: 684 m (2,244 ft)

Population (2021)
  - Total: 736
- Time zone: UTC+1 (CET)
  - Summer (DST): UTC+2 (CEST)
- Area code: +38946
- Car plates: SU
- Website: .

Zagračani (Macedonian: Заграчани, Albanian: Zagraçan) is a village in the municipality of Struga, North Macedonia.

== Demographics ==
The village of Zagračani is inhabited by Tosks, a subgroup of southern Albanians and speak the Tosk Albanian dialect. Amidst the Albanian population of Zagračani are a few Macedonian Muslim families originating from the villages of Oktisi and Podgorci who now speak Albanian.

As of the 2021 census, Zagračani had 736 residents with the following ethnic composition:

- Albanians 719
- Persons for whom data are taken from administrative sources 17

According to the 2002 census, the village had a total of 1,075 inhabitants. Ethnic groups in the village include:

- Albanians: 1,071 (99.62%)
- Macedonians: 1 (0.09%)
- Others: 3 (0.27%)

== Sports ==
Local football club KF Liria plays in the Macedonian Third League (Southwest Division).
