= Livada, Struga =

Livada Ливада Livadh
- Village
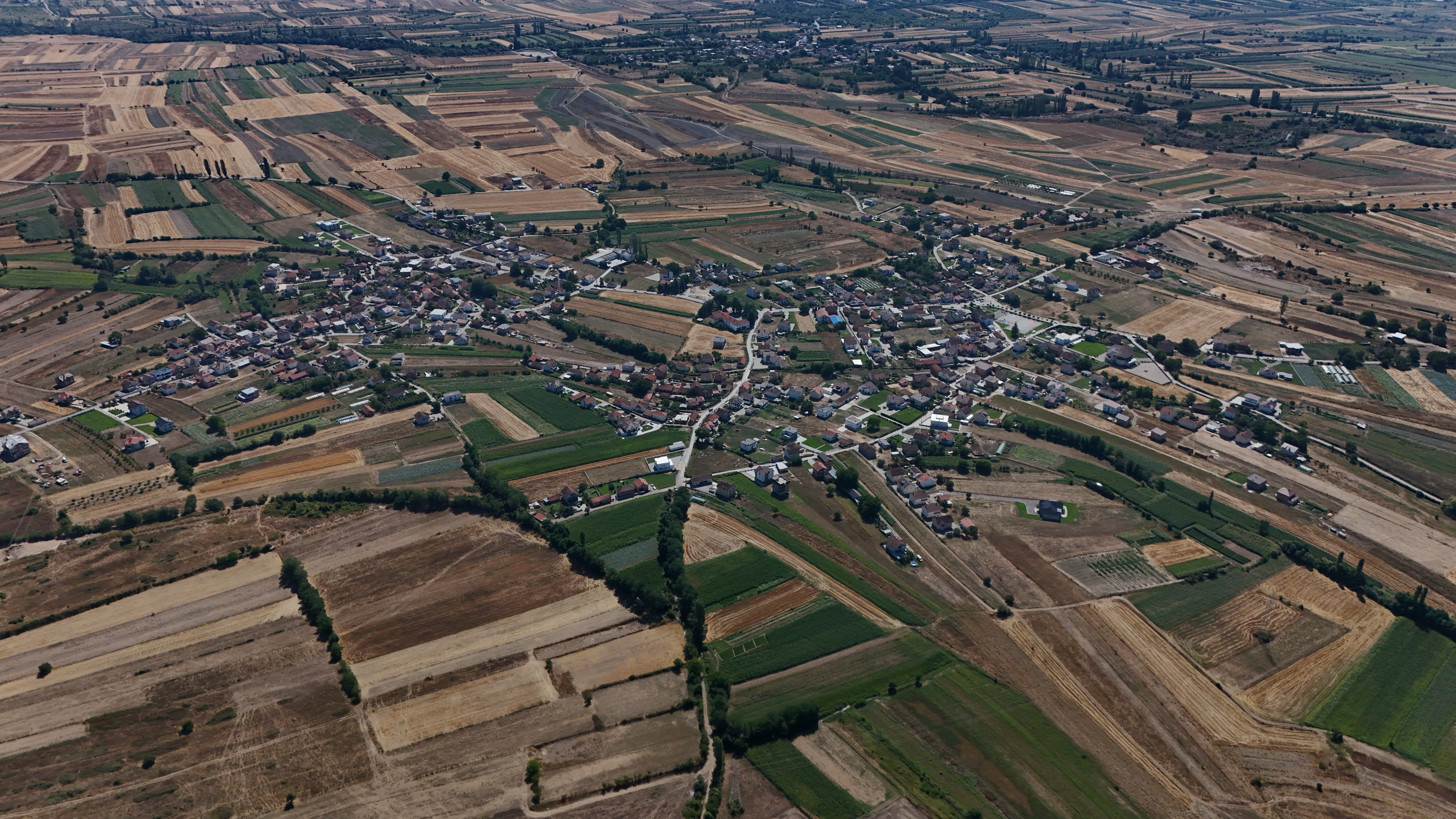
- Air view of the village

- Location within North Macedonia
- Coordinates: 41°13′54″N 20°43′27″E
- Country: North Macedonia
- Region: Southwestern
- Municipality: Struga
- Elevation: 695 m (2,280 ft)

Population (2021)
  - Total: 1,132
- Time zone: UTC+1 (CET)
  - Summer (DST): UTC+2 (CEST)
- Area code: +38946
- Car plates: SU
- Website: .

Livada (Macedonian: Ливада, Albanian: Livadh) is a village in the municipality of Struga, North Macedonia.

== Demographics ==
As of the 2021 census, Livada had 1,112 residents with the following ethnic composition:

- Albanians 1,111
- Macedonians 1

According to the 2002 census, the village had a total of 1389 inhabitants. Ethnic groups in the village include:

- Albanians 1388
- Macedonians 1

Artim Šakiri, an Albanian, Macedonian footballer was born and raised here.

The religious composition in 2002 was:

Christians 1388

Muslim 1
