= Bidževo =

Bidževo Биџево Bixhovë
- Village
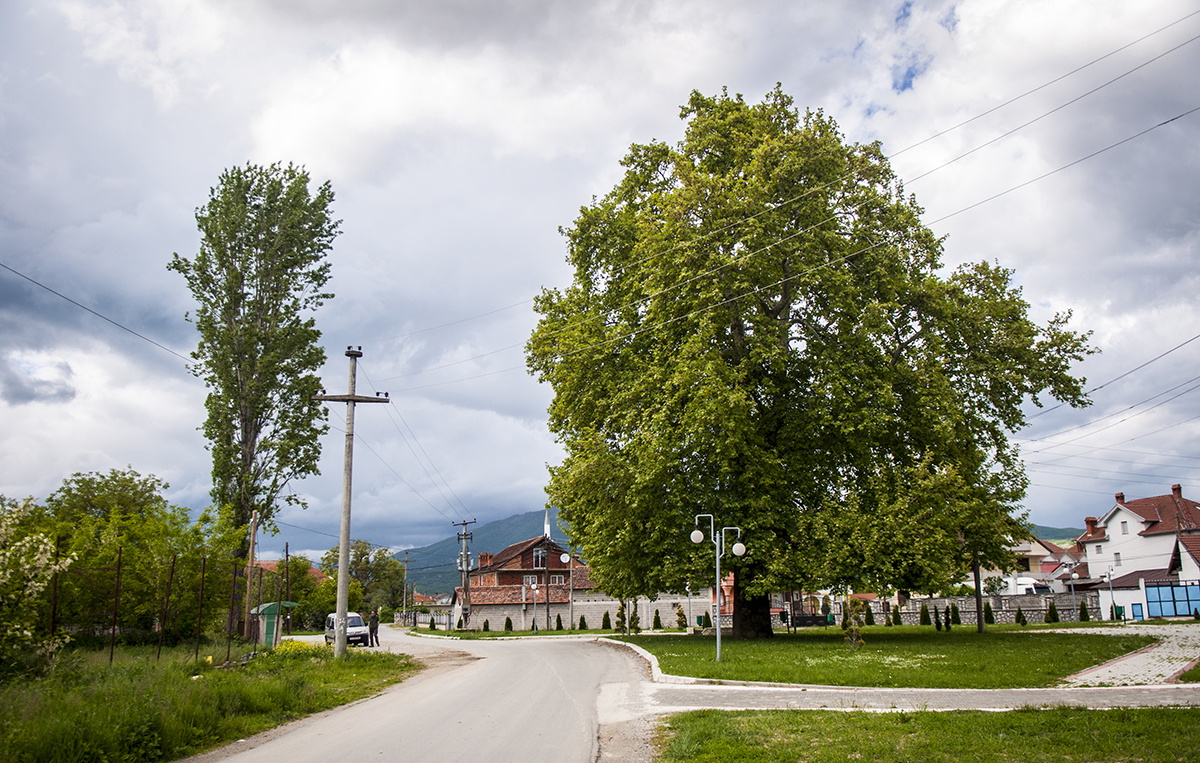
- Bidževo

- Location within North Macedonia
- Coordinates: 41°13′48″N 20°41′53″E
- Country: North Macedonia
- Region: Southwestern
- Municipality: Struga
- Elevation: 694 m (2,277 ft)

Population (2021)
  - Total: 290
- Time zone: UTC+1 (CET)
  - Summer (DST): UTC+2 (CEST)
- Area code: +38946
- Car plates: SU
- Website: .

Bidževo (Macedonian: Биџево, Albanian: Bixhovë) is a village in the municipality of Struga, North Macedonia.

== Demographics ==
According to the 1943 Albanian census, Oktisi was inhabited by 37 Muslim Albanians and 164 Orthodox Bulgarians.

As of the 2021 census, Bidževo had 290 residents with the following ethnic composition:

- Albanians 207
- Macedonians 71
- Persons for whom data are taken from administrative sources 12

According to the 2002 census, the village had a total of 546 inhabitants. Ethnic groups in the village include:

- Albanians 421
- Macedonians 118
- Others 7
