= Zbaždi =

Zbaždi Збажди
- Village
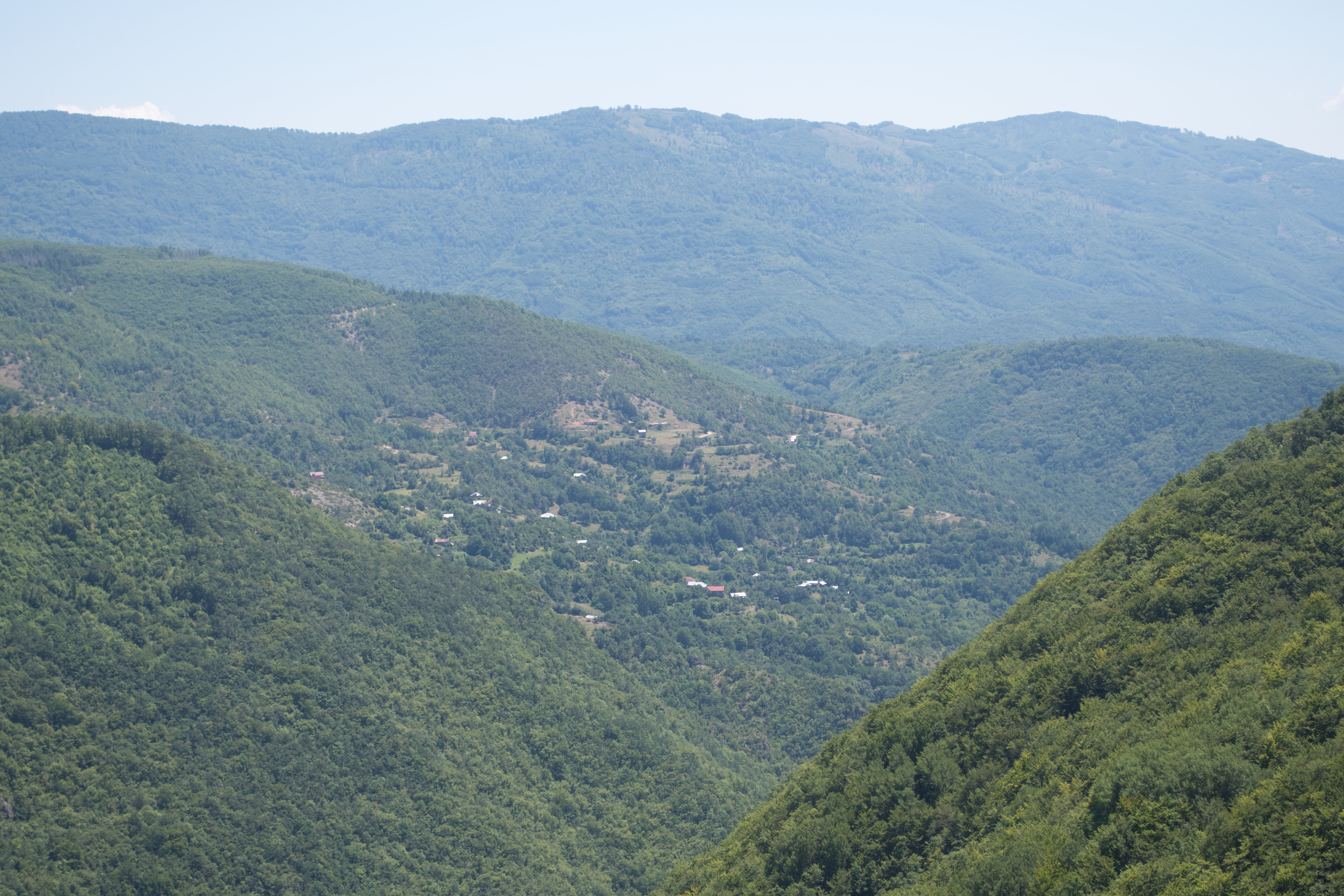
- Panoramic view of the village

- Location within North Macedonia
- Country: North Macedonia
- Region: Southwestern
- Municipality: Struga
- Elevation: 1,252 m (4,108 ft)

Population (2021)
  - Total: 10
- Time zone: UTC+1 (CET)
- Area code: +38946

Zbaždi (Macedonian: Збажди) is a village in Municipality of Struga, North Macedonia.

== Population ==
As of the 2021 census, Zbaždi had 10 residents with the following ethnic composition:

- Macedonians 4
- Persons for whom data are taken from administrative sources 6

Population (2002 Macedonian census): 10

- Macedonians 10
