= Lokov =

Lokov Локов
- Village
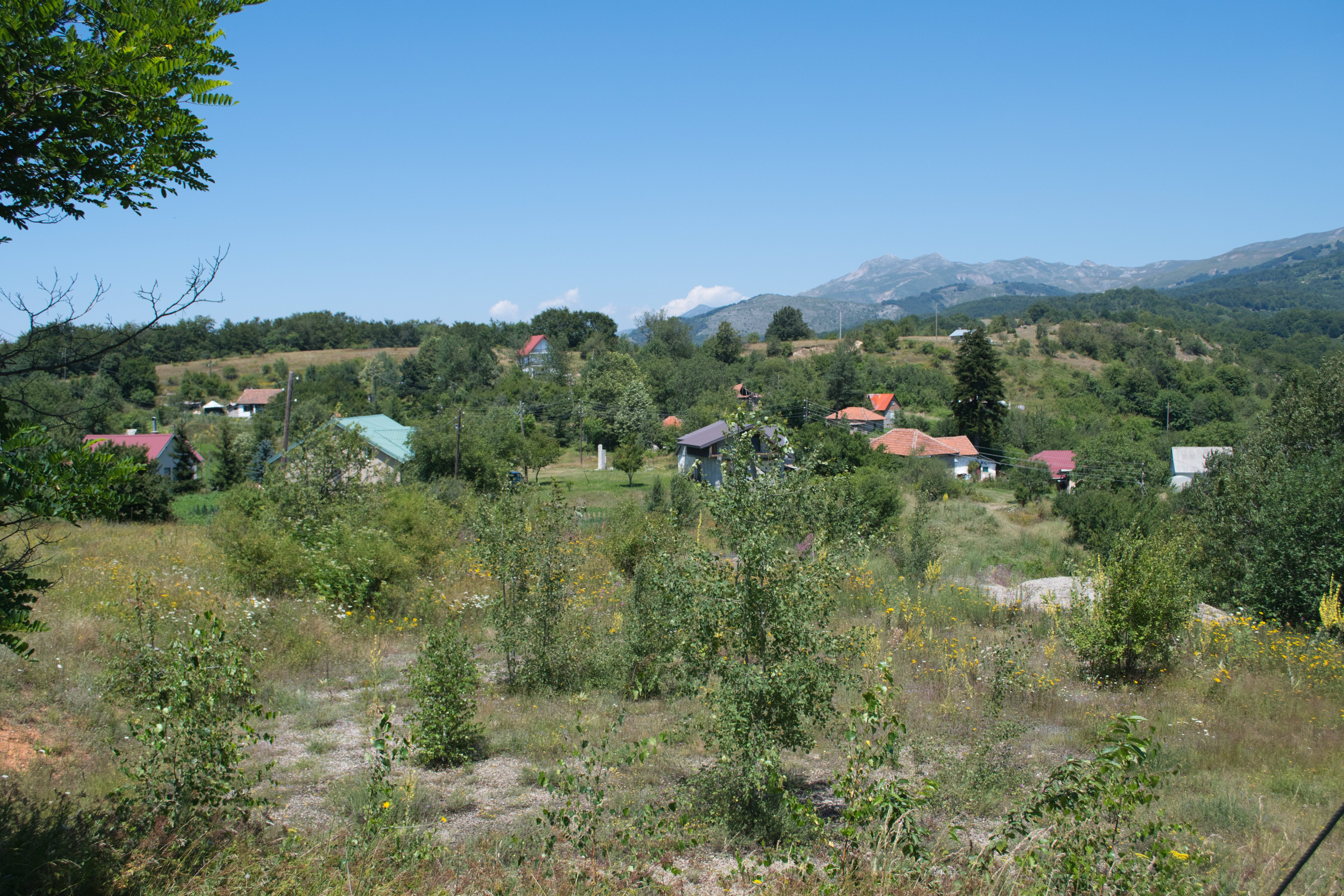
- Panoramic view of the village

- Location within North Macedonia
- Country: North Macedonia
- Region: Southwestern
- Municipality: Struga
- Elevation: 1,460 m (4,790 ft)

Population (2002)
  - Total: 0
- Time zone: UTC+1 (CET)
- Area code: +38946

Lokov is a village in Municipality of Struga, North Macedonia.

== Population ==
Population of Lokov migrated to: Vojvodina, Struga, and Novo Lagovo.
