= Prisovjani =

Prisovjani Присовјани
- Village
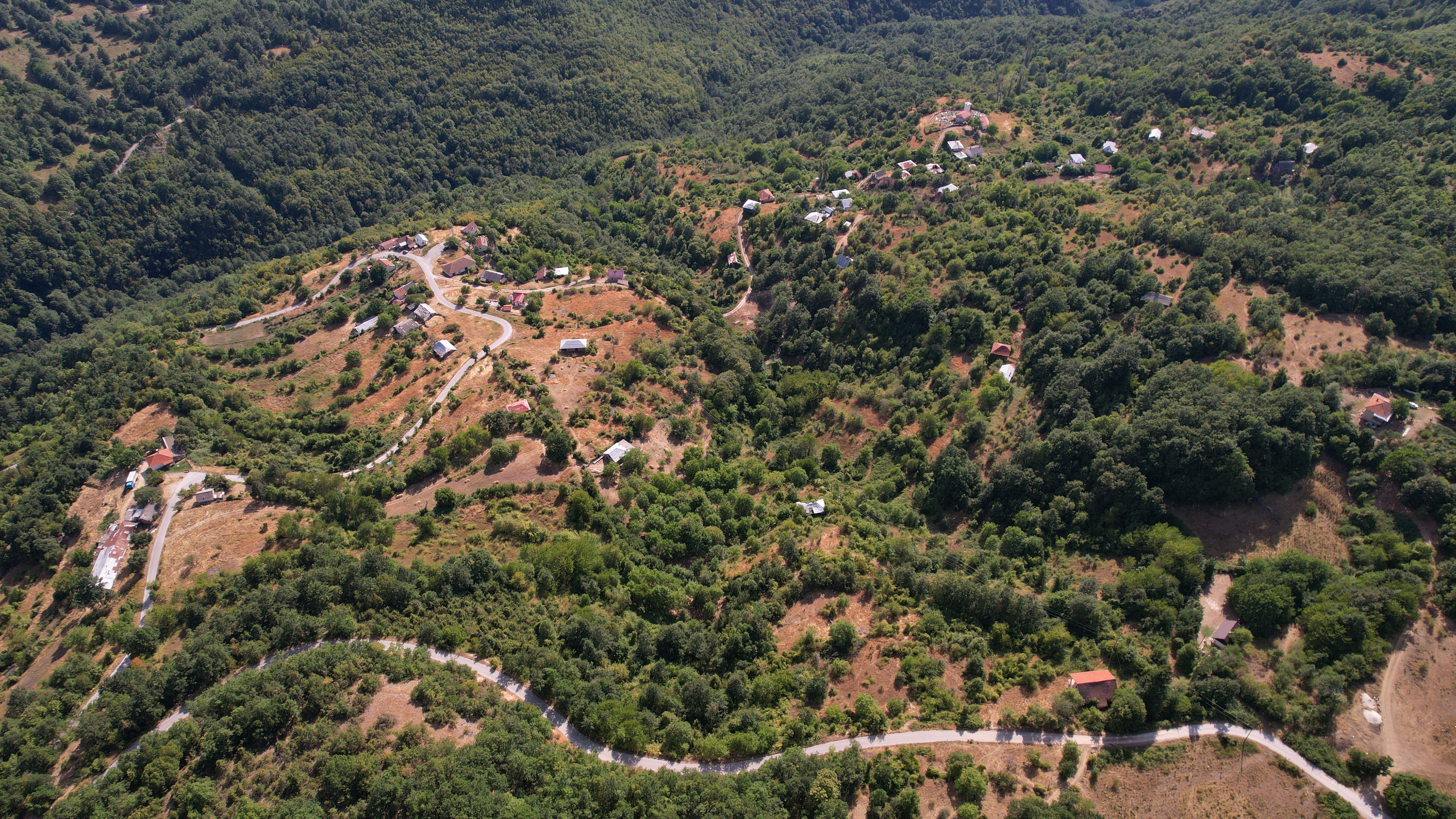
- Air view of the village

- Location within North Macedonia
- Country: North Macedonia
- Region: Southwestern
- Municipality: Struga
- Elevation: 1,053 m (3,455 ft)

Population (2002)
  - Total: 11
- Time zone: UTC+1 (CET)
- Area code: +38946

Prisovjani is a village in Municipality of Struga, North Macedonia.

== Population ==
The current population is 11 Macedonians. Ethnic groups in the village include:
