= Brčevo =

Brchevo / Brčevo Брчево
- Village
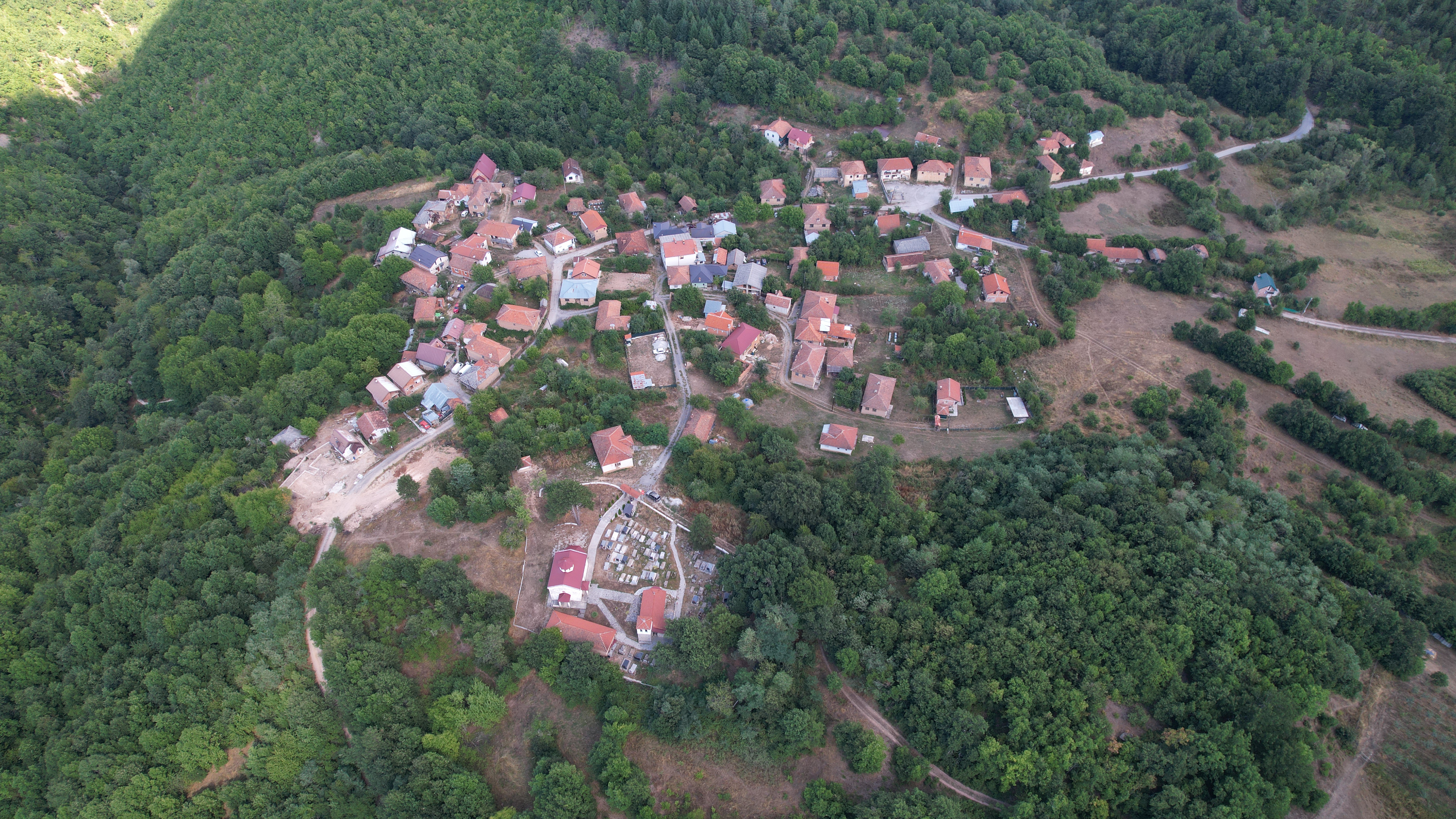
- Air view of the village

- Location within North Macedonia
- Country: North Macedonia
- Region: Southwestern
- Municipality: Struga
- Elevation: 921 m (3,022 ft)

Population (2002)
  - Total: 9
- Time zone: UTC+1 (CET)
- Area code: +38946

Brčevo (Macedonian Cyrillic: Брчево) is a small village located near Struga, in the Struga municipality in the western region of North Macedonia. The village is situated 921 m (3,022 ft) above sea level and has a population of 20.

The village was once a thriving community but has in the last 30 years lost the majority of its population to the commercial centres on it, such as Struga. The village is still visited regularly by it previous residents and related family for religious holidays and for the maintenance of the village housing.

According to the 1943 Albanian census, Brčevo was inhabited by 377 Orthodox Bulgarians.
