= Oktisi =

Oktisi Oktis
- Village
- Октиси
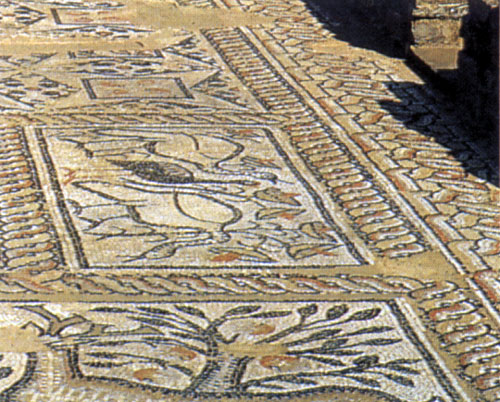
- Detail from basilica near Oktisi

- Location within North Macedonia
- Coordinates: 41°13′57″N 20°36′25″E
- Country: North Macedonia
- Region: Southwestern
- Municipality: Struga
- Elevation: 750 m (2,460 ft)

Population (2021)
  - Total: 1,925
- Time zone: UTC+1 (CET)
  - Summer (DST): UTC+2 (CEST)
- Area code: +38946
- Car plates: SU

Oktisi (Macedonian: Октиси, Albanian: Oktis) is a village in the municipality of Struga, North Macedonia.

== History ==
In 1900, Vasil Kanchov gathered and compiled statistics on demographics in the area and reported that the village of Oktisi was inhabited by about 840 Bulgarian Christians and 550 Bulgarian Muslims.

The "La Macédoine et sa Population Chrétienne" survey by Dimitar Mishev (D. Brankov) concluded that the Christian part of the local population in 1905 was composed of 1016 Bulgarian Exarchists. There was a Bulgarian school in the beginning of 20th century

=== Oktis Basilica ===
The Oktis Basilica was a paleochristian basilica in the northern part of the village of Oktis, but the church of the village (St. Nicholas) was built on the foundations of this basilica in 1927. In 1954, the Archaeological Museum of Macedonia undertook excavations of the basilica, which continued until 1994 under Dimçe Koço. The basilica has dimensions of 27.20 x 24.10 m., and consists of a narthex, exonarthex, side annexes and an intersection. It was constructed in a single phase. The floors of the central ship, the narthex, the crossroads, and the northern annex are filled with mosaics, decorated with geometric elements and fauna as well as a few preserved parts of the animal world. The Oktis Basilica is believed to originate in the 5th century as a sacred temple for the inhabitants of that early Christian period, which are hypothesised to be part of the wider ancestral population of the Albanians. The archaeological materials found in the excavations of the site are preserved in the People's Museum of Struga. It is possible that the mosaic in the narthex of the basilica represents the awareness of Christian unity among the early Albanian Byzantine Christian communities.

== Demographics ==
Oktisi has traditionally been inhabited by Orthodox Macedonians and a Torbeš population.

As of the 2021 census, Oktisi had 1,925 residents with the following ethnic composition:

- Turks 762
- Macedonians 409
- Others (including Torbeš) 342
- Albanians 241
- Persons for whom data are taken from administrative sources 171

According to the 2002 census, the village had a total of 2,479 inhabitants. Ethnic groups in the village include:

- Turks 1,071
- Macedonians 955
- Albanians 346
- Romani 1
- Serbs 1
- Bosniaks 15
- Others 91
