= Gorno Tateši =

Gorno Tateši Горно Татеши Tatesh i Epërm
- Village
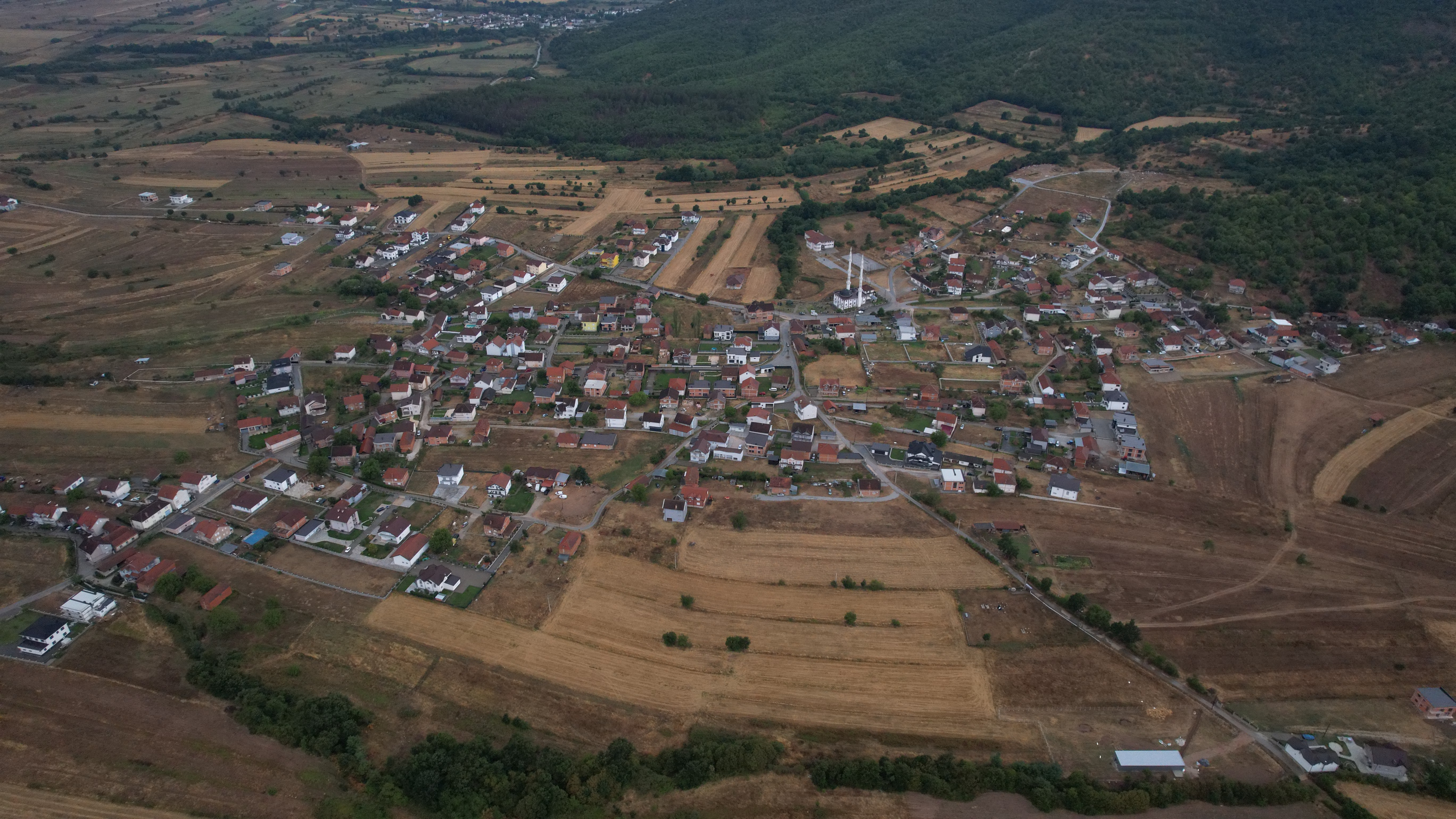
- Air view of the village

- Location within North Macedonia
- Coordinates: 41°15′37″N 20°40′37″E
- Country: North Macedonia
- Region: Southwestern
- Municipality: Struga
- Elevation: 853 m (2,799 ft)

Population (2021)
  - Total: 619
- Time zone: UTC+1 (CET)
  - Summer (DST): UTC+2 (CEST)
- Area code: +38946
- Car plates: SU
- Website: .

Gorno Tateši (Macedonian: Горно Татеши, Albanian: Tatesh i Epërm) is a village in the municipality of Struga, North Macedonia.

== Name ==
The name of the village is an Albanian toponym and derived possibly from a personal name.

== Demographics ==
As of the 2021 census, Gorno Tateši had 619 residents with the following ethnic composition:

- Albanians 601
- Persons for whom data are taken from administrative sources 15
- Others 2
- Macedonians 1

According to the 2002 census, the village had a total of 1148 inhabitants. Ethnic groups in the village include:

- Albanians 1144
- Macedonians 1
- Vlachs 1
- Others 2
