= Ržanovo, Struga =

Ržanovo / Rzhanovo ’Ржаново
- Village
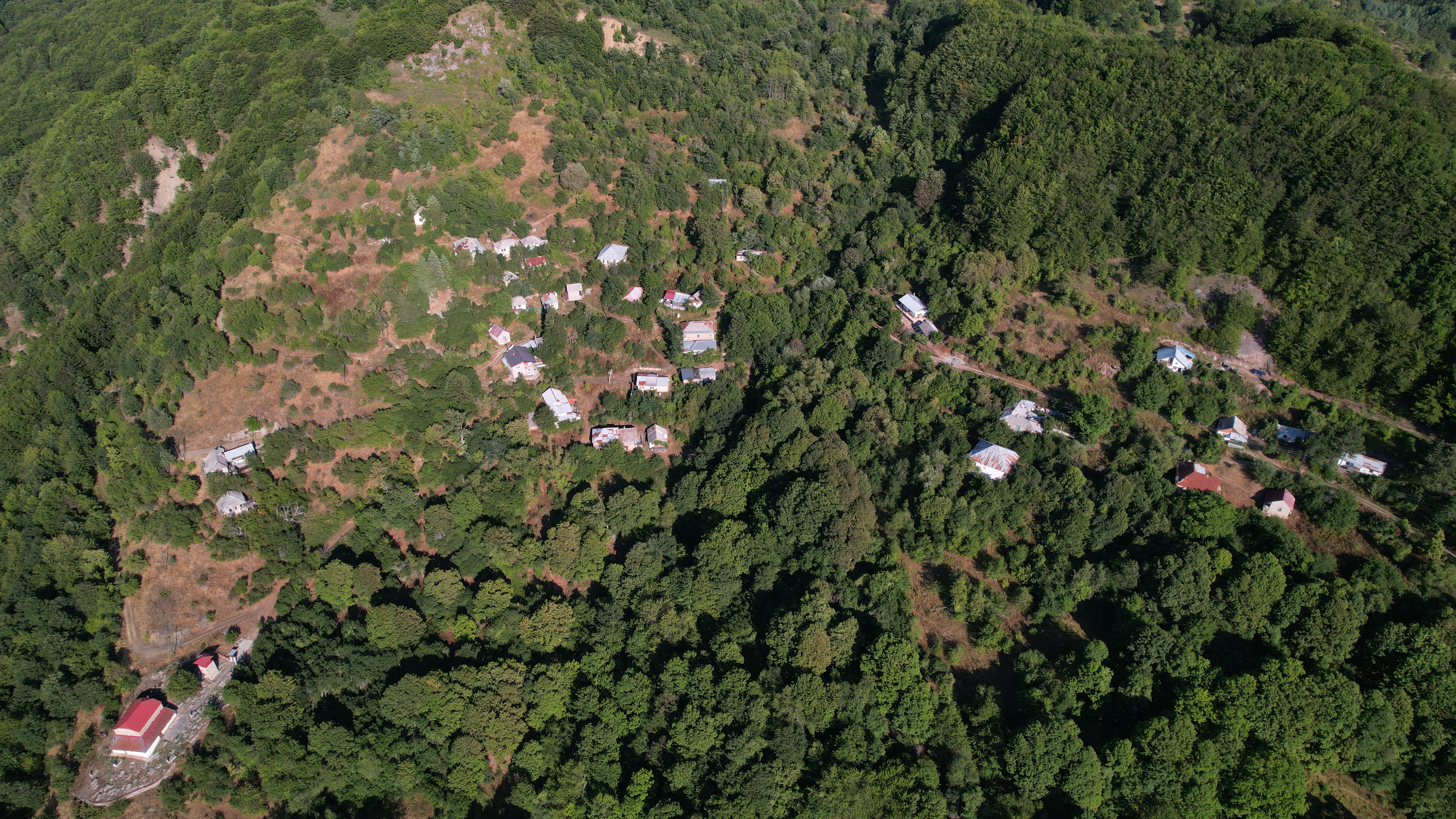
- Air view of the village

- Location within North Macedonia
- Country: North Macedonia
- Region: Southwestern
- Municipality: Struga
- Elevation: 1,250 m (4,100 ft)

Population (2002)
  - Total: 0
- Time zone: UTC+1 (CET)
- Area code: +38946

Ržanovo or Rzhanovo (Macedonian: ’Ржаново) is a village in the municipality of Struga, North Macedonia.
