= Umovo =

- Village
- Умово
- Location within North Macedonia
- Coordinates: 41°52′N 21°26′E
- Country: North Macedonia
- Region: Skopje
- Municipality: Studeničani

Population (2002)
  - Total: 0
- Time zone: UTC+1 (CET)
  - Summer (DST): UTC+2 (CEST)
- Car plates: SK
- Website: .

Umovo (Macedonian: Умово) is an uninhabited village in the municipality of Studeničani, North Macedonia.

== History ==
During the great migration movements in the region of Macedonia at the end of the 17th and beginning of the 18th centuries, Slavic-speaking Muslims left the Debar area for the central regions of Macedonia and established villages such as Umovo located in the Skopje area.

== Demographics ==
On the 1927 ethnic map of Leonhard Schulze-Jena, the village is shown as an Albanian village.

The village when inhabited in past times had a Torbeš population.

The Yugoslav census of 1953 recorded 825 people of whom 815 were Turks, 6 Macedonians and 4 others. The 1961 Yugoslav census recorded 64 people, all Turks. The 1971 census recorded 17 people, all Turks. The 1981 Yugoslav census was the last to record any people as residing in the village which contained 35 inhabitants, all Turks. According to the 2002 census, the village had a total of 0 inhabitants.
