= Kaldirec =

Kaldirec Калдирец Kalldirec
- Village
- Location within North Macedonia
- Coordinates: 41°50′N 21°28′E
- Country: North Macedonia
- Region: Skopje
- Municipality: Studeničani

Population (2002)
  - Total: 0
- Time zone: UTC+1 (CET)
  - Summer (DST): UTC+2 (CEST)
- Car plates: SK
- Website: .

Kaldirec (Macedonian: Калдирец, Albanian: Kalldirec) is an abandoned village in the municipality of Studeničani, North Macedonia.

== Demographics ==
Kaldirec was a newly formed village during the 19th century founded by stockbreeders from surrounding villages. The 1961 Yugoslav census was the last to record any people as residing in the village which contained 40 inhabitants, 35 Albanians and 5 Turks. According to the 2002 census, the village had 0 inhabitants.
