= Marko's River =

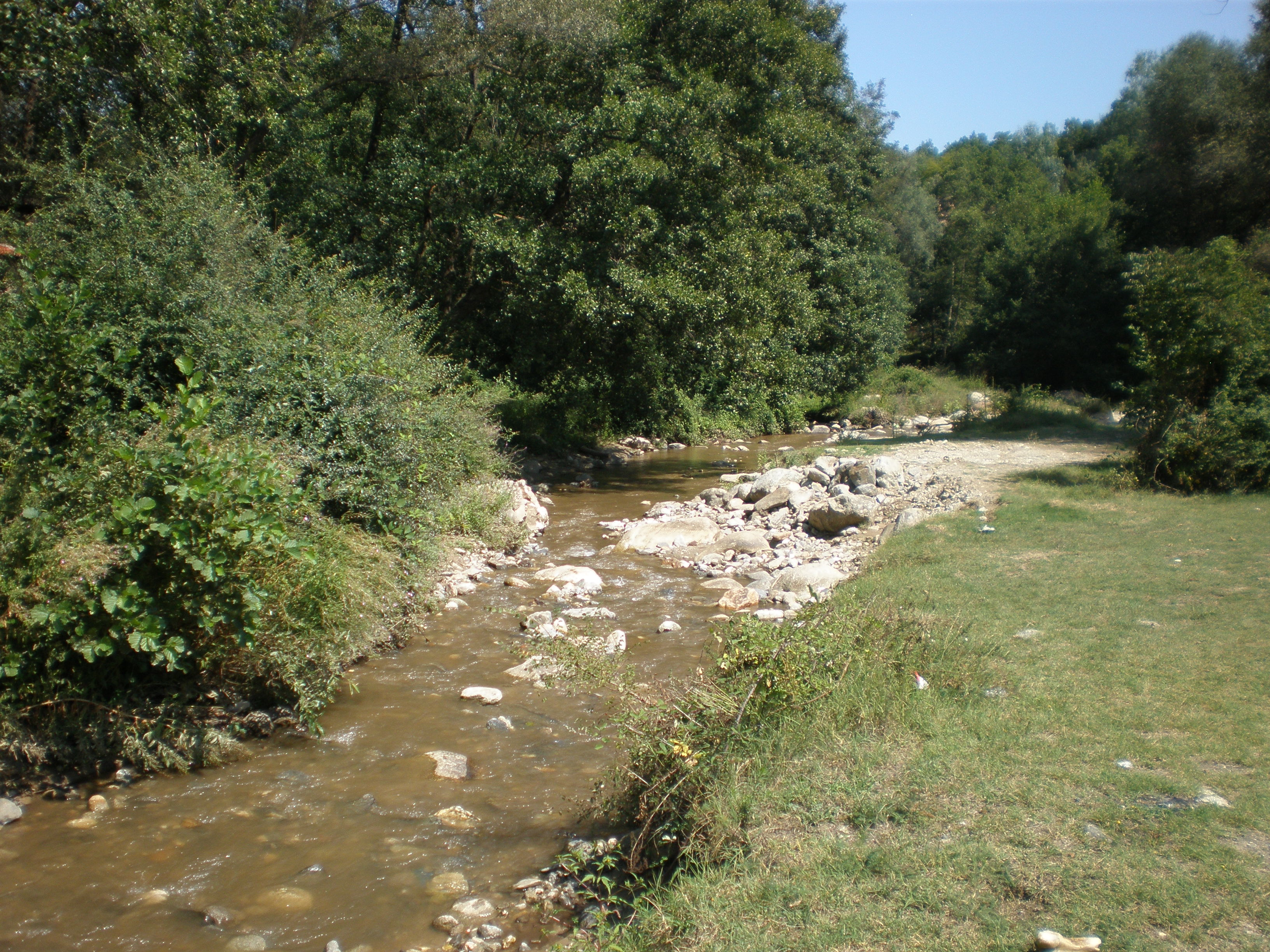
- Native name: Маркова Река (Macedonian)

Location
- Country: North Macedonia

Physical characteristics
- Mouth
  - location: Vardar
  - coordinates: 41°58′26″N 21°30′44″E
- Length: 30 km (19 mi)
- Basin size: 184 km^{2} (71 sq mi)

Marko's River (Macedonian: Маркова Река, Markova Reka; Albanian: Lumi i Markut) is a river in North Macedonia. It rises in the chain of Jakupica at 1,900 m above sea level, then descends to the northeast and flows into Vardar, at an altitude of 212 m. It crosses in particular the villages of Batinci, Markova Sušica and Dračevo. It flows into Vardar near the suburb of Gorno Lisiče, on the outskirts of Skopje.

Marko's River has a maximum depth of four meters. It is subject to summer drought and snowmelt in the spring, and therefore experiences a very different flow depending on the season. Its name, along with the village of Markova Sušica and Marko's Monastery, pays homage to Prince Marko, the de jure Serbian king from the 14th century. The river has great potential for irrigation.
