= Elovo =

- Village
- Елово
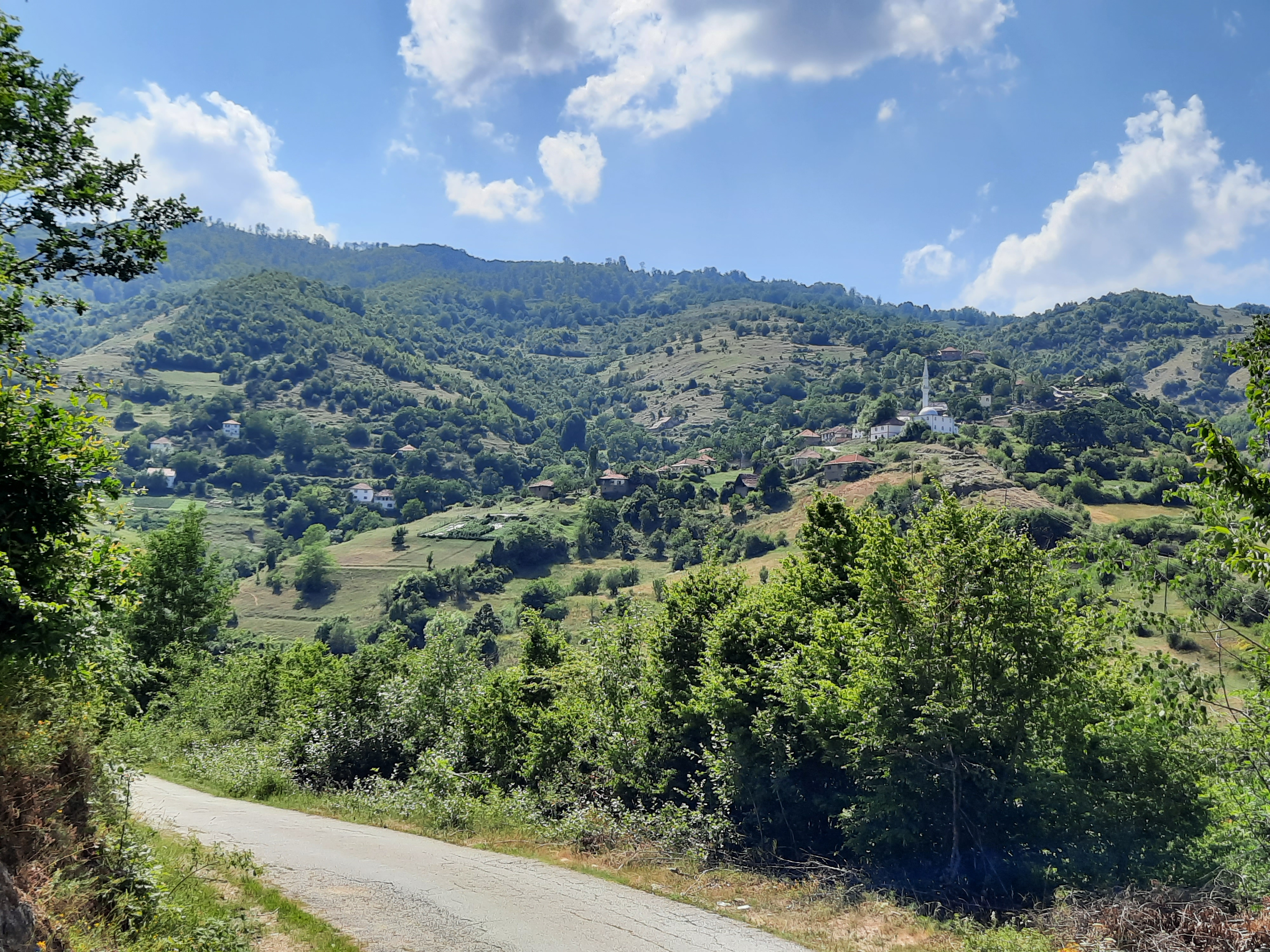

- Location within North Macedonia
- Coordinates: 41°50′N 21°22′E
- Country: North Macedonia
- Region: Skopje
- Municipality: Studeničani

Population (2021)
  - Total: 198
- Time zone: UTC+1 (CET)
  - Summer (DST): UTC+2 (CEST)
- Car plates: SK
- Website: .

Elovo (Macedonian: Елово) is a village in the municipality of Studeničani, North Macedonia.

The village is Torbeš, because of socially-economic factor they declare themselves as Turks

== History ==
The village is mentioned in historical records since the 13th century CE. The inhabitants of the village appear to have been in conflict with protosebastos Pribo Vlastelin, who was a Bulgarian feudal landowner in the area between Skopje and Veles. The villagers who seem to have been in relations of feudal servitude with Vlastelin came into open conflict with him and their parish priest Dragomir. During the conflict the Metropolitan of Skopje Jovan, removed Dragomir from Elovo and later defrocked him. During the great migration movements in Macedonia at the end of the 17th and beginning of the 18th centuries, Slavic-speaking Muslims left the Debar area for the central regions of Macedonia and settled in villages such as Elovo located in the Skopje area.

On the 1927 ethnic map of Leonhard Schulze-Jena, the village is written as "Elova" and shown as a Muslim Albanian village. According to the 1929 ethnographic map by Russian Slavist Afanasy Selishchev, Elovo was an Albanian village.

== Demographics ==
In the second half of the 20th century, Elovo was inhabited by a Torbeši population. In Elovo there are a number of Albanian families (13) from the neighbouring village of Crn Vrv who reside there through marriage with locals and are assimilated in the village.

According to the 2021 census, the village had a total of 198 inhabitants. Ethnic groups in the village include:

- Persons for whom data are taken from administrative sources 99
- Turks 98
- Albanians 1

Year	Macedonian	Albanian	Turks	Romani	Vlachs	Serbs	Bosniaks	Others	Persons for whom data are taken from administrative sources	Total
2002	1	13	247	...	...	...	...	4	n/a	265
2021	...	1	98	...	...	...	...	...	99	198
