= Ramni Gaber =

Ramni Gaber Рамни Габер Gaber
- Village
- Location within North Macedonia
- Coordinates: 41°52′N 21°31′E
- Country: North Macedonia
- Region: Skopje
- Municipality: Studeničani

Population (2021)
  - Total: 20
- Time zone: UTC+1 (CET)
  - Summer (DST): UTC+2 (CEST)
- Car plates: SK
- Website: .

Ramni Gaber (Macedonian: Рамни Габер, Albanian: Gaber) is a village in the municipality of Studeničani, North Macedonia.

== Demographics ==
According to the 2021 census, the village had a total of 20 inhabitants. Ethnic groups in the village include:

- Albanians – 7
- Others – 13

Year	Macedonian	Albanian	Turks	Romani	Vlachs	Serbs	Bosniaks	Others	Total
2002	...	39	...	...	...	...	...	...	39
2021	...	7	...	...	...	...	...	13	20
