= Dolno Količani =

- Village

transcription(s)
  - Macedonian: Долно Количани
  - Albanian: Koliçan i Poshtëm
  - Turkish: Аşağı Koliçan
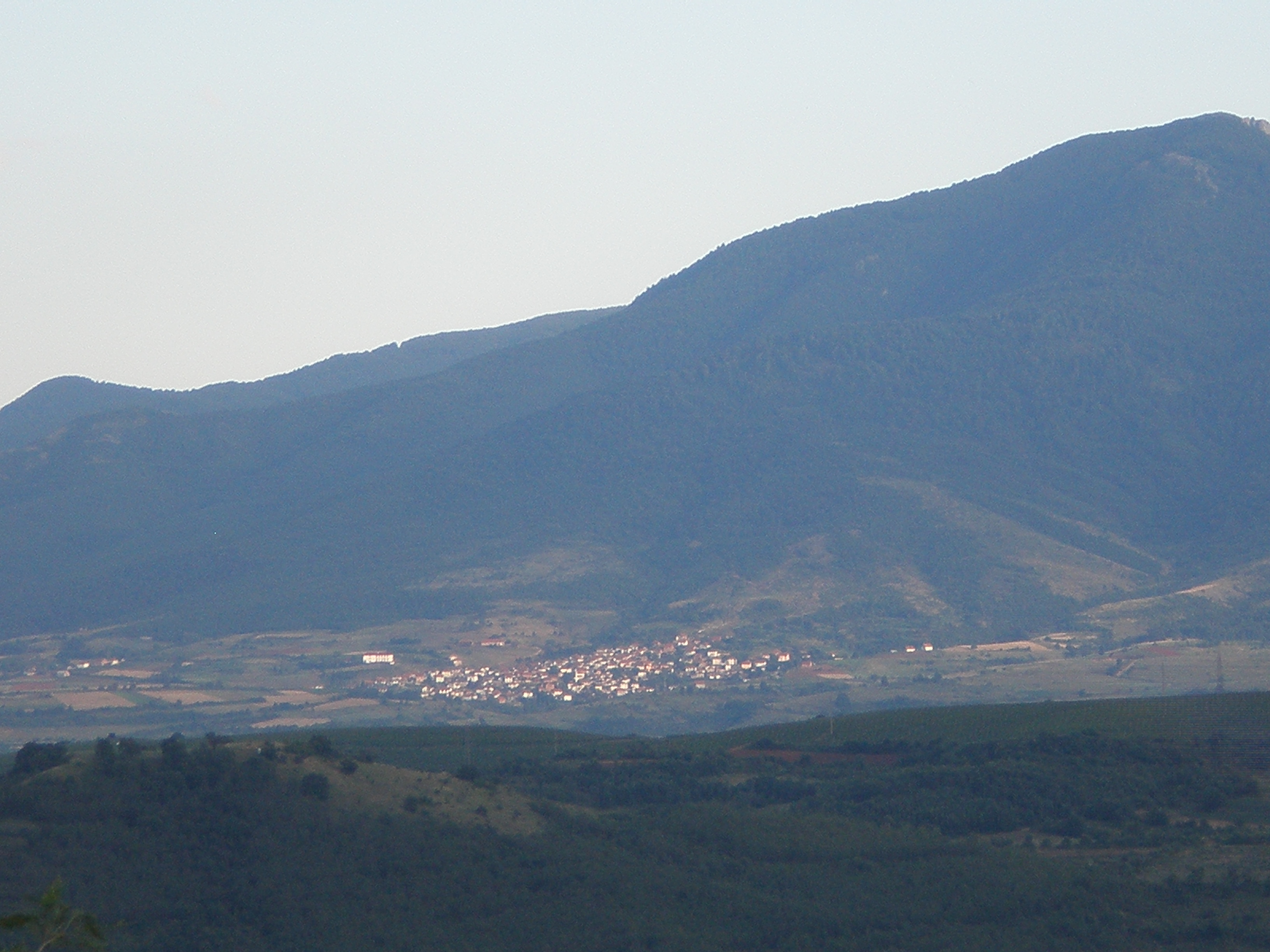
- Dolno Količani

- Location within North Macedonia
- Coordinates: 41°53′N 21°29′E
- Country: North Macedonia
- Region: Skopje
- Municipality: Studeničani

Population (2012)
  - Total: 1,831
- Time zone: UTC+1 (CET)
  - Summer (DST): UTC+2 (CEST)
- Car plates: SK
- Website: .

Dolno Količani (Macedonian: Долно Количани) is a village in the municipality of Studeničani, North Macedonia.

== Demographics ==
On the 1927 ethnic map of Leonhard Schulze-Jena, the village is shown as an Albanian village.

Dolno Količani has traditionally been inhabited by a Torbeš population. The village appears in 15th century Ottoman documents written in the form of Dollna Kluçani. During the great migration movements in Macedonia at the end of the 17th and beginning of the 18th centuries, Muslims left the Debar area for the central regions of Macedonia and established themselves in villages such as Dolno Količani located in the Skopje area.

According to the 2021 census, the village had a total of 1.831 inhabitants. Ethnic groups in the village include:

- Turks 1.739
- Albanians 12
- Bosniaks 11
- Others 69

Year	Macedonian	Albanian	Turks	Romani	Vlachs	Serbs	Bosniaks	Others	Total
2002	1	1	1.507	...	...	...	...	1	1.510
2021	...	12	1.739	...	...	...	11	69	1.831
