= Poum, Struga =

Poum Поум Pohum
- Village
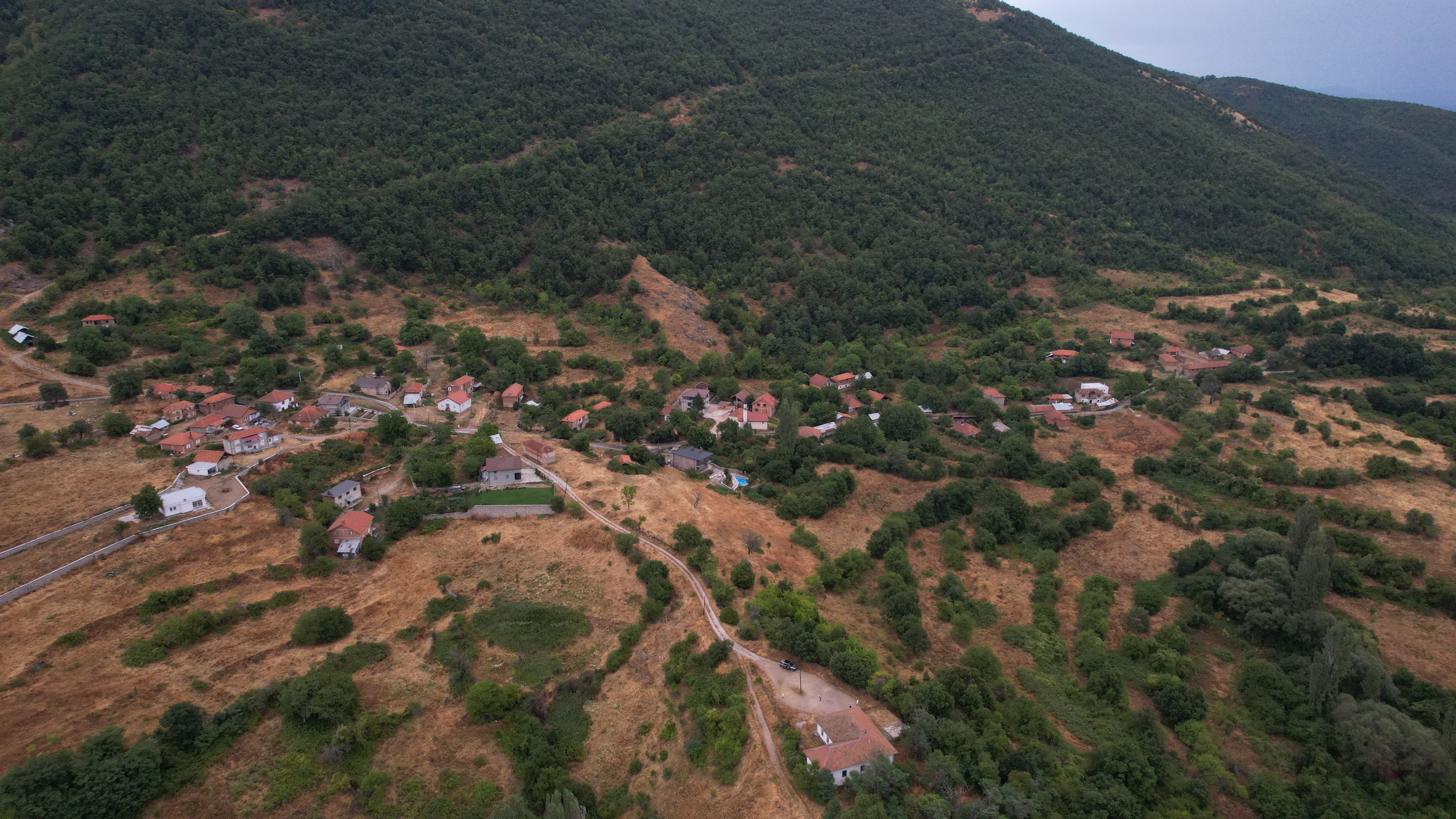
- Air view of the village

- Location within North Macedonia
- Coordinates: 41°16′54″N 20°42′41″E
- Country: North Macedonia
- Region: Southwestern
- Municipality: Struga
- Elevation: 1,167 m (3,829 ft)

Population (2021)
  - Total: 67
- Time zone: UTC+1 (CET)
  - Summer (DST): UTC+2 (CEST)
- Area code: +38946
- Car plates: SU
- Website: .

Poum (Macedonian: Поум, Albanian: Pohum) is a village in the municipality of Struga, North Macedonia.

== Geography ==
Poum borders Mislodežda to the northwest, Bogojci to the west, Delogoždi to the southeast, Pesočani and Crvena Voda to the northwest, Dolno Tateši in the southwest, the Karaorman Mountain to the north and Botun to the east.

== Etymology ==
In Albanian, the village is known as Pohum. One theory states that the village's name is possibly derived from an Albanian personal name, such as Pohum or Paum. Another theory that is based on traditional folklore states that the village's name may possibly derive from the compounding of two Albanians words - ‘Po’ and ‘Humb’. According to local folklore, the area was initially covered in dense forests. Two goatherds approached the forests and began to wander within the woodlands, jokingly announcing that they will "get lost" (“Po humem” in the local Albanian dialect). They stumbled upon a clearing with a stream of water and would eventually settle in the area due to the favourable conditions, calling it “Pohum”.

The attempts to find a Slavic derivation for the name cannot be scientifically explained - they have been part of an unscientific effort to try and give every toponym a Slavic origin for ulterior reasons. The toponyms of the village, such as Guri i Gjatë, Preshma Kuq, Livadhi i Kaleshit, Vromi i vogëj, Përrenjtë, Prroj Veshit, Brinja e Pusit etc, are of Albanian origin.

== History ==
Poum is one of the oldest localities in the Struga region and was first mentioned in the Ottoman defter of 1583, when it was recorded as part of the Sanjak of Ohrid with the name Bohun. Both Albanian and Slav Orthodox names were present amongst the inhabitants, who made an annual tax payment of 2,800 akçe. Old ruins and gravestones can be found nearly 1km to the east of the village, and it is said that there was once a church and a medieval necropolis in the area.

Around 500m east of Poum lies the locality known as Kashnesh, which is said to have once been a settlement that was burnt down by Ottoman forces sometime around the middle of the 19th century. Poum, alongside other nearby Albanian villages, was also targeted by Ottoman forces around this time. When the Ottomans planned to destroy the neighbouring village of Dollogozhdë, its headman sought help from the headman of Poum, and they organized a defensive force of 150 rifles drawn from the surrounding settlements. Negotiations with the Ottoman commander failed, triggering an organized armed resistance that surprised the Ottoman forces, ultimately resulting in the Ottomans cancelling their orders to burn the village. Influential Albanian members of the local Ottoman administration who hailed from Poum also played an important role in protecting these villages from being destroyed. Some Albanians from Poum were also part of the Ottoman army, serving in places such as Syria and Yemen, and some even settled in those same lands.

The village of Poum and its inhabitants have continuously been involved in a variety of conflicts throughout the Balkans and across the Ottoman Empire. The Albanians here have fought against both Slav and Ottoman occupation. Members of the village participated in the Young Turk Revolution, the Ilinden Uprising, the Kruševo Republic, the Ohrid–Debar uprising, the Balkan Wars and the World Wars, as did many other Albanians. After Serbian troops suppressed the Albanian uprising of 1913, they began to terrorise the local Albanian population, including the inhabitants of Poum. During World War II, men from the village participated in both the Balli Kombëtar and the LANÇ.

== Anthropology ==
Poum is inhabited by a vast majority of Albanians. The main families of the village include the Isaku, Naxhaku, Jashari, Dervishi, Zeqiri, Doko, Hasani, Biba, Lloga, Shabani, Murtezai and Rizvani families, all of Albanian origin, although other families have lived in Poum in the past, including some of mixed origin. Most of the aforementioned families are native to the village. All branches of the Dervishi, Shabani, Zeqiri and Jashari families have migrated from the village, and none of the members of these families have remained in Poum. The Naxhaku family is said to have migrated to Poum from Dibër due to a blood feud, while the Lloga family is believed to originate from Llogë, a village in the Mati region. The Biba family is said to have originated from the village of Bibaj in the Mirdita region. The Murtezai family are said to have integrated into the Isaku family, and although they do not originate from the Isakus, they are considered to be part of the Isaku tribe. Until recently, the Rizvani family declared themselves to be of the same tribe as the Jashari family, but now call themselves Rizvani as the Jashari no longer live in Poum.

The inhabitants of the village speak the Gheg dialect of Albanian. A special characteristic of the local Gheg Albanian dialects of Misllodezhda, Koroshishta, Livadhia, Dollogozhda and Poum, is the diphthongisation of the vowels [i] and [y] in [ëi] and [u] in [ou].

== Demographics ==
In 1889, Poum was recorded as having 25 homes and 100 Muslim Albanian inhabitants, and 55 homes with 402 inhabitants in 1897 by the Austrian viceconsul in Manastir. In that same year, Vasil Kanchov recorded the village as having 60 Muslim families with 424 inhabitants in total, while Serbian documents from 1914 record Poum as having 395 inhabitants. In 1921, Poum had 73 families with 369 inhabitants in total. By 1952, Poum consisted of 90 homes, but the population greatly decreased from then onwards after the Yugoslav government introduced legislation that banned the raising of goats as livestock; as a village, Poum was very successful in terms of raising livestock and especially goats, which has historically been the base of the village's economy. In 1948, the village had 5,000 goats, 500 sheep and 200 cows, but after 1952, minimal amounts of livestock were raised in the village.

As of the 2021 census, Poum had 67 residents with the following ethnic composition:

- Albanians 58
- Persons for whom data are taken from administrative sources 9

According to the 2002 census, the village had a total of 168 inhabitants. Ethnic groups in the village include:

- Albanians 164
- Others 4
