= Gorno Količani =

Gorno Količani Горно Количани Koliçan i Epërm
- Village
- Location within North Macedonia
- Coordinates: 41°53′N 21°28′E
- Country: North Macedonia
- Region: Skopje
- Municipality: Studeničani

Population (2021)
  - Total: 248
- Time zone: UTC+1 (CET)
  - Summer (DST): UTC+2 (CEST)
- Car plates: SK
- Website: .

Gorno Količani (Macedonian: Горно Количани, Albanian: Koliçan i Epërm) is a village in the municipality of Studeničani, North Macedonia.

== Demographics ==
According to the 2021 census, the village had a total of 248 inhabitants. Ethnic groups in the village include:

- Albanians 195
- Others 53

Year	Macedonian	Albanian	Turks	Romani	Vlachs	Serbs	Bosniaks	Others	Total
2002	1	306	...	...	...	...	...	2	309
2021	...	195	...	...	...	...	...	53	248
