= Morani, Studeničani =

Morani Морани Maran
- Village
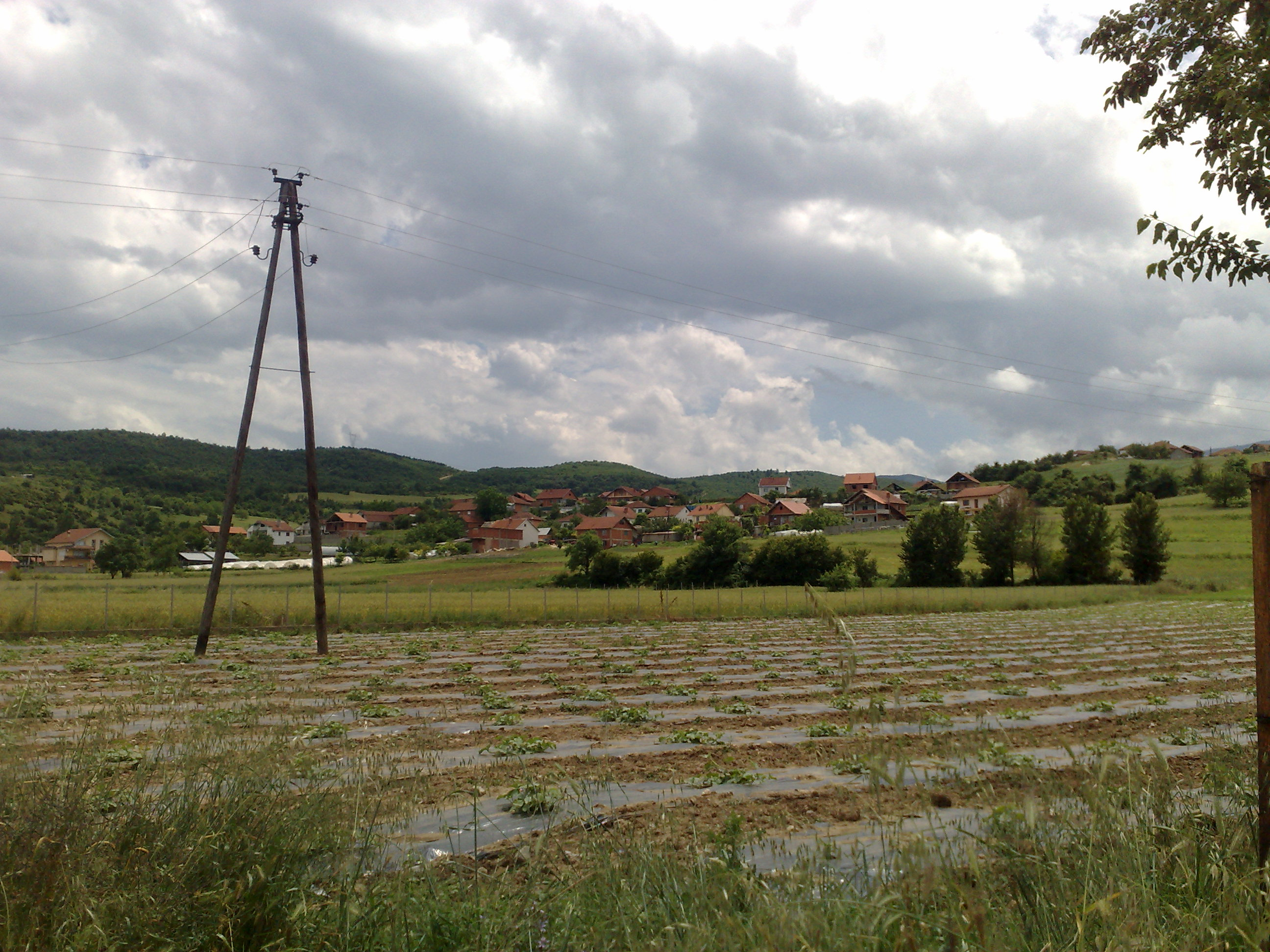

- Location within North Macedonia
- Coordinates: 41°55′N 21°33′E
- Country: North Macedonia
- Region: Skopje
- Municipality: Studeničani

Population (2021)
  - Total: 2,595
- Time zone: UTC+1 (CET)
  - Summer (DST): UTC+2 (CEST)
- Car plates: SK

Morani (Macedonian: Морани, Albanian: Maran) is a village in the municipality of Studeničani, North Macedonia.

== Demographics ==
According to the 2021 census, the village had a total of 2.595 inhabitants. Ethnic groups in the village include:

- Albanians 2.396
- Macedonians 78
- Romani 46
- Turks 6
- Serbs 8
- Others 61

Year	Macedonian	Albanian	Turks	Romani	Vlachs	Serbs	Bosniaks	Others	Total
2002	58	1.528	40	71	...	9	...	9	1.715
2021	78	2.396	6	46	...	8	...	61	2.595
