= Pagaruša, Studeničani =

Pagaruša
- Village
- Пагаруша
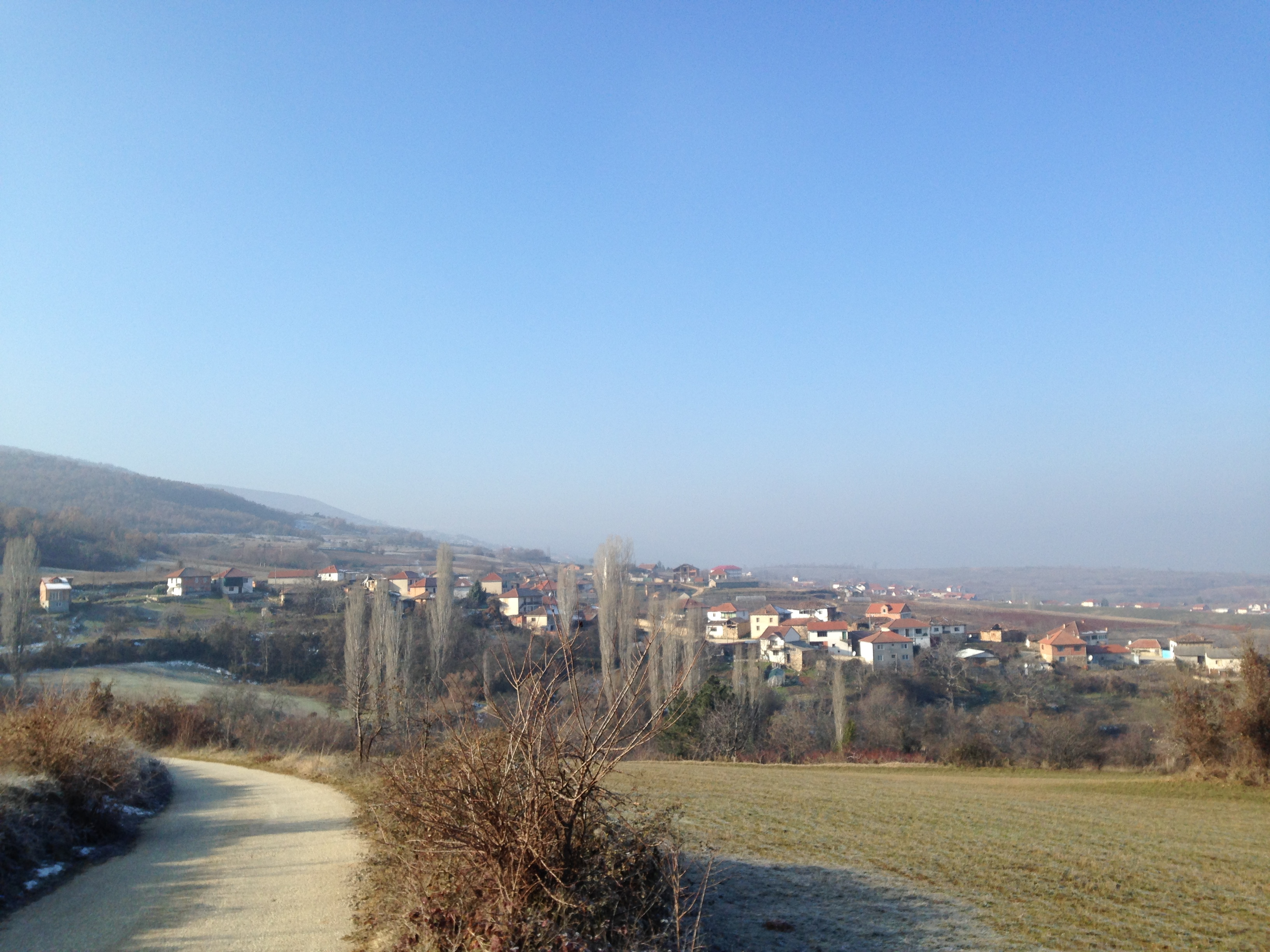

- Location within North Macedonia
- Coordinates: 41°53′N 21°30′E
- Country: North Macedonia
- Region: Skopje
- Municipality: Studeničani

Population (2021)
  - Total: 181
- Time zone: UTC+1 (CET)
  - Summer (DST): UTC+2 (CEST)
- Car plates: SK
- Website: .

Pagaruša (Macedonian: Пагаруша) is a village in the municipality of Studeničani, North Macedonia.

== History ==
The village is recorded in the 1467/68 defter, as a timar (land grant) of Hamza Arnauti, Arnaut being a Turkified version for Albanian. During the end of the 17th and beginning of the 18th centuries, Muslims from the Debar area settled in villages in the Skopje area, such as Pagaruša.

== Demographics ==
On the 1927 ethnic map of Leonhard Schulze-Jena, the village is shown as an Albanian village. Pagaruša has traditionally been inhabited by a Torbeš population. The village has undergone some depopulation as villagers have migrated to Turkey or nearby Skopje and surrounding villages in North Macedonia. Though most Macedonian-speaking Muslims are Sunni, in Pagaruša followers of Sufi Islam are present attached to various Sufi orders such as the Melami, Halveti.

According to the 2021 census, the village had a total of 181 inhabitants. Ethnic groups in the village include:

- Turks 147
- Albanians 9
- Others 25

Year	Macedonian	Albanian	Turks	Romani	Vlachs	Serbs	Bosniaks	Others	Total
2002	...	1	226	...	...	...	...	...	227
2021	...	9	147	...	...	...	...	25	181
