= Malčište =

Malčište Малчиште Malçisht
- Village
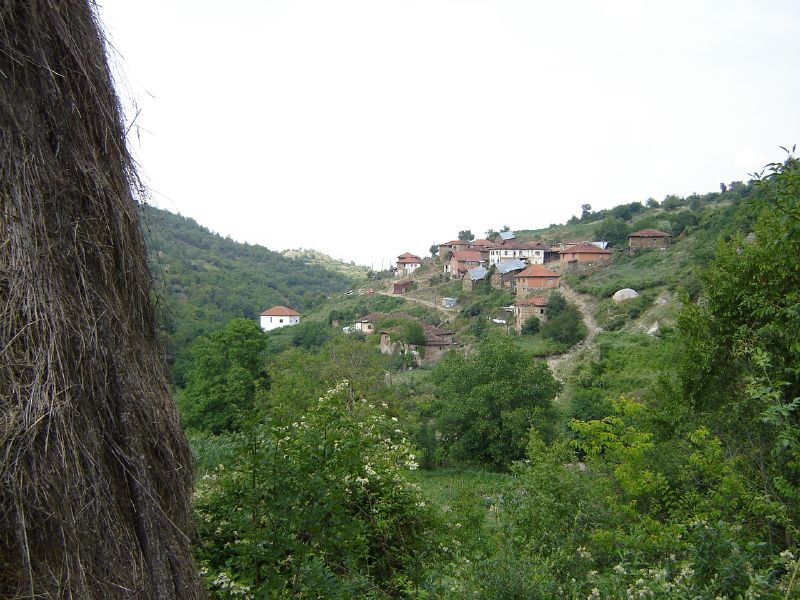
- Village of Malčište

- Location within North Macedonia
- Coordinates: 41°53′N 21°23′E
- Country: North Macedonia
- Region: Skopje
- Municipality: Studeničani

Population (2021)
  - Total: 38
- Time zone: UTC+1 (CET)
  - Summer (DST): UTC+2 (CEST)
- Car plates: SK
- Website: .

Malčište (Macedonian: Малчиште, Albanian: Malçisht) is a village in the municipality of Studeničani, North Macedonia.

== Name ==
The name stems from the Albanian word for mountains, mal

== Demographics ==
According to the 1467-68 Ottoman defter, Malčište appears as being inhabited by an Orthodox Christian population. Some families had a mixed Slavic-Albanian anthroponomy. The names are:Niko son of Dom-ina, Radoslav son of Dom-ina, Hranislav son of Dona, Bojko son of Dona, Gropça son of Goja, Radislav son of Dominiko, Spana (Stana) widow.

In statistics gathered by Vasil Kanchov in 1900, the village of Malčište was inhabited by 90 Muslim Albanians. On the 1927 ethnic map of Leonhard Schulze-Jena, the village is shown as an Albanian village. The Yugoslav census of 1953 recorded 194 people of whom 135 were Albanians, 52 Turks and 7 Macedonians. The 1961 Yugoslav census recorded 159 people of whom were 158 Turks and 1 Albanian. The 1971 census recorded 51 people of whom were Turks. The 1981 Yugoslav census recorded 69 people of whom were 47 Turks, 17 Albanians, 1 Macedonian and 4 others. The Macedonian census of 1994 recorded 7 Turks.

According to the 2021 census, the village had a total of 38 inhabitants. Ethnic groups in the village include:

- Albanians 12
- Others 26

Year	Macedonian	Albanian	Turks	Romani	Vlachs	Serbs	Bosniaks	Others	Total
2002	...	9	51	...	...	...	...	...	60
2021	...	12	...	...	...	...	...	26	38
