= Crn Vrv =

Crn Vrv may refer to:

- Maja e zezë (Crn Vrv), a mountain in Kosovo and Macedonia
- Crn Vrv, Studeničani, a village in the Republic of Macedonia
