= Vrtekica =

Vrtekica Вртекица Vërtekicë
- Village
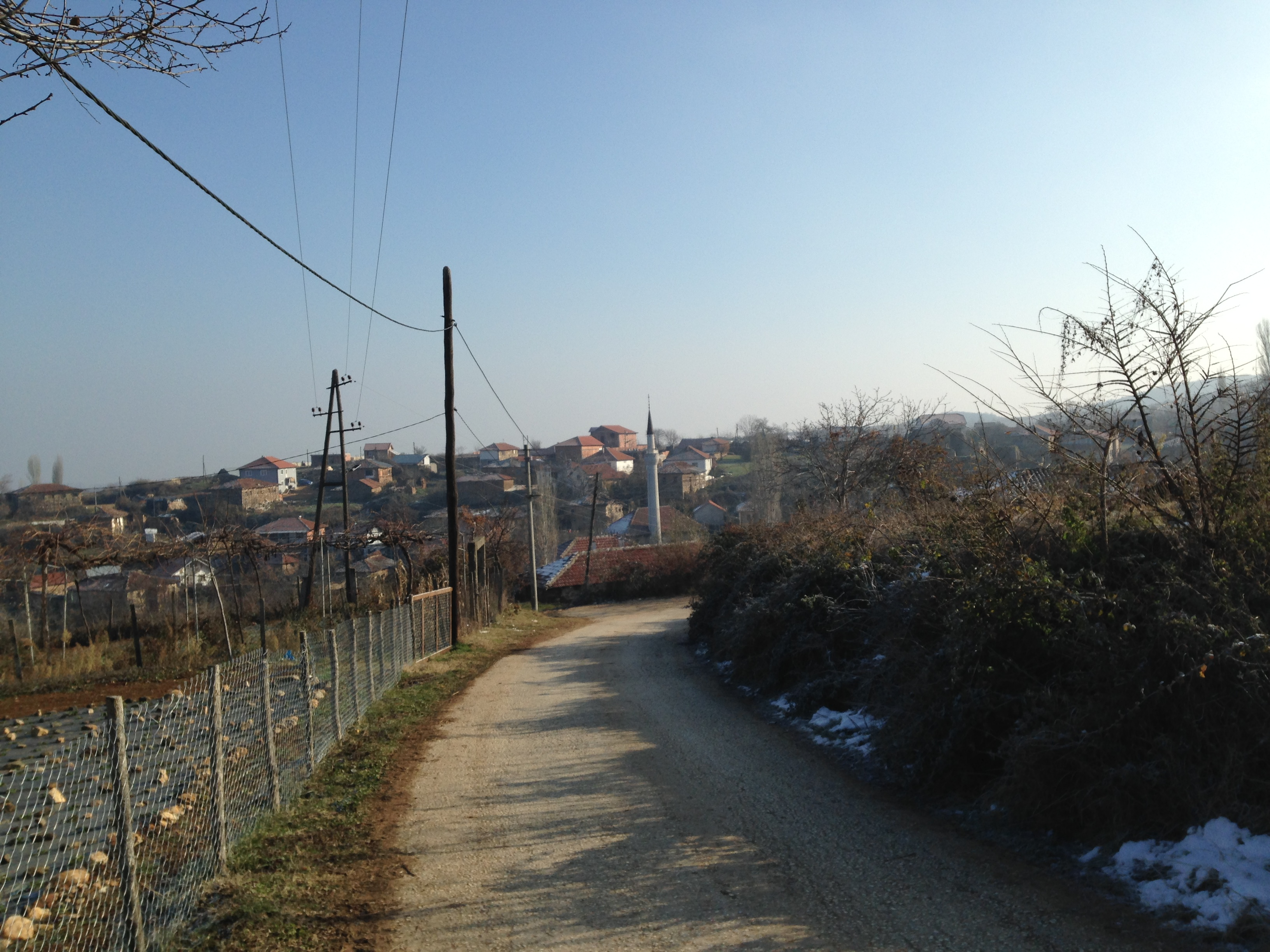
- Vrtekica village

- Location within North Macedonia
- Coordinates: 41°53′N 21°31′E
- Country: North Macedonia
- Region: Skopje
- Municipality: Studeničani

Population (2021)
  - Total: 90
- Time zone: UTC+1 (CET)
  - Summer (DST): UTC+2 (CEST)
- Car plates: SK
- Website: .

Vrtekica (Macedonian: Вртекица, Albanian: Vërtekicë) is a village in the municipality of Studeničani, North Macedonia.

== Demographics ==
According to the 1467-68 Ottoman defter, Vrtekica appears as being inhabited by an Orthodox Albanian population. Some families had a mixed Slav-Albanian anthroponomy - usually a Slavic first name and an Albanian last name or last names with Albanian patronyms and Slavic suffixes.

The names are: Jorgo son of Progon, Leka Kovac (treasurer), Preno son of Stala, Kolojan son of Ton-ço, Tonço son of Kalojan.

According to the 2021 census, the village had a total of 90 inhabitants. Ethnic groups in the village include:

- Albanians 90

Year	Macedonian	Albanian	Turks	Romani	Vlachs	Serbs	Bosniaks	Others	Total
2002	...	111	...	...	...	...	...	...	111
2021	...	90	...	...	...	...	...	...	90
