= Dračevica =

Dračevica may refer to:

- Dračevica, Croatia, a village on the island of Brač
- Dračevica (župa), a medieval region near today's Herceg Novi, Montenegro
- Dračevica, Montenegro, a village near Bar, Montenegro
- Dračevica, Studeničani, a village in the municipality of Studeničani, Republic of North Macedonia
- Dračevica, Demir Kapija, a village in the municipality of Demir Kapija, Republic of North Macedonia
