= Cvetovo =

- Village

transcription(s)
  - Macedonian: Цветово
  - Albanian: Cvetovë
  - Turkish: Tsvetova
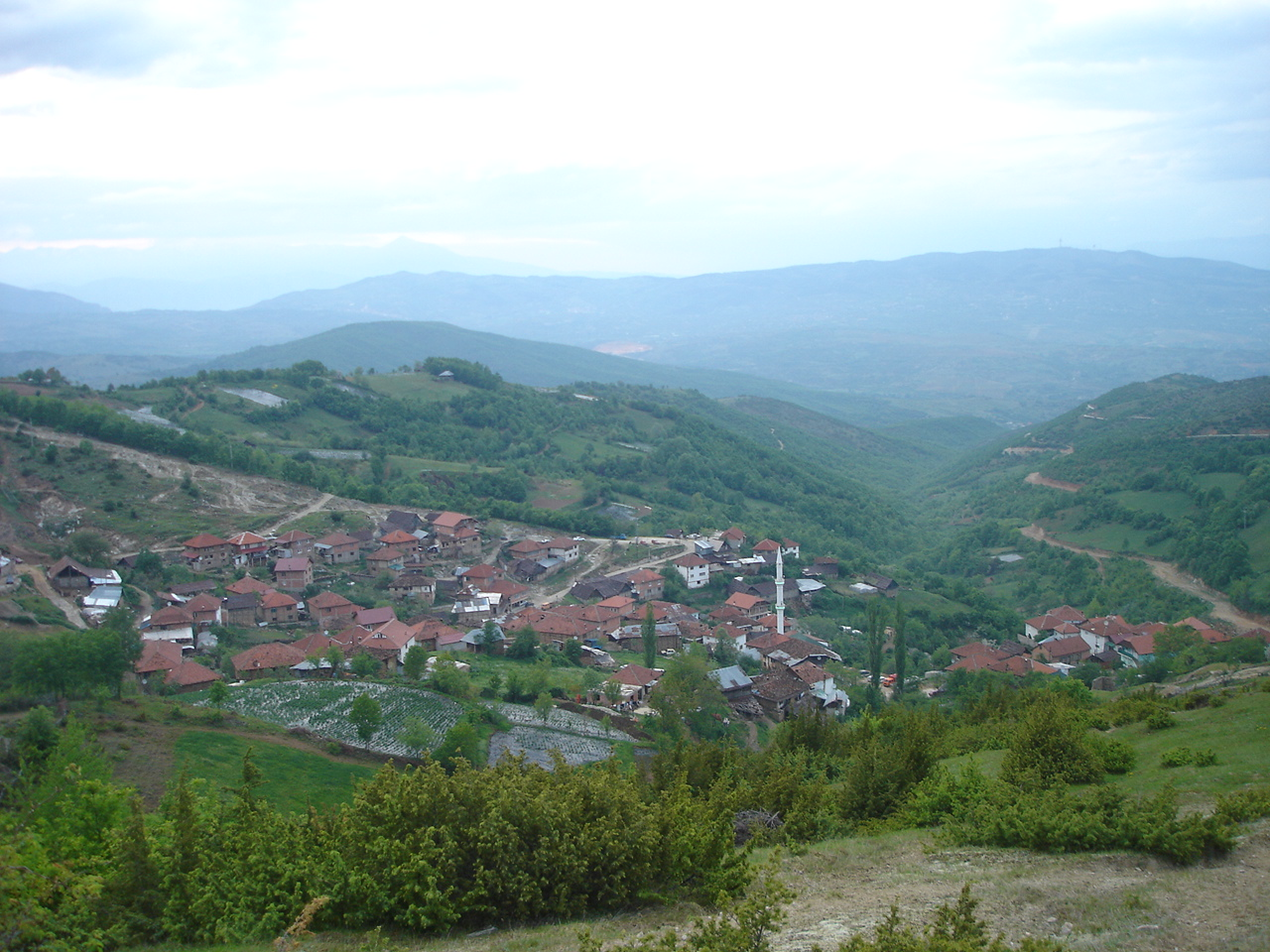
- Cvetovo

- Location within North Macedonia
- Coordinates: 41°51′N 21°25′E
- Country: North Macedonia
- Region: Skopje
- Municipality: Studeničani

Population (2021)
  - Total: 809
- Time zone: UTC+1 (CET)
  - Summer (DST): UTC+2 (CEST)
- Car plates: SK
- Website: .

Cvetovo (Macedonian: Цветово) is a village in the municipality of Studeničani, North Macedonia.

== History ==
During the great migration movements in Macedonia at the end of the 17th and beginning of the 18th centuries, Slavic-speaking Muslims left the Debar area for the central regions of Macedonia and established villages such as Cvetovo located in the Skopje area.

== Demographics ==
On the 1927 ethnic map of Leonhard Schulze-Jena, the village is shown as an Albanian village. According to the 1929 ethnographic map by Russian Slavist Afanasy Selishchev, Cvetovo was an Albanian village.

In the second half of the 20th century Cvetovo, was inhabited by a Torbeš population.

According to the 2021 census, the village had a total of 809 inhabitants. Ethnic groups in the village include:

- Turks 592
- Persons for whom data are taken from administrative sources 215
- Albanians 1
- Others 1

Year	Macedonian	Albanian	Turks	Romani	Vlachs	Serbs	Bosniaks	Others	Total
1953	18	4	929	6	...	...	...	10	967
1961	1	...	518	...	...	...	...	...	519
1971	1	...	457	...	...	...	...	3	461
1981	...	...	609	...	...	...	...	1	610
1994	12	835	...	...	...	...	...	...	847
2002	...	...	805	...	...	...	...	2	807
2021	...	1	592	...	...	...	...	216	809
