= Batinci =

- Village

transcription(s)
  - Albanian: Batincë
  - Macedonian: Батинци
  - Bosnian: Batinci
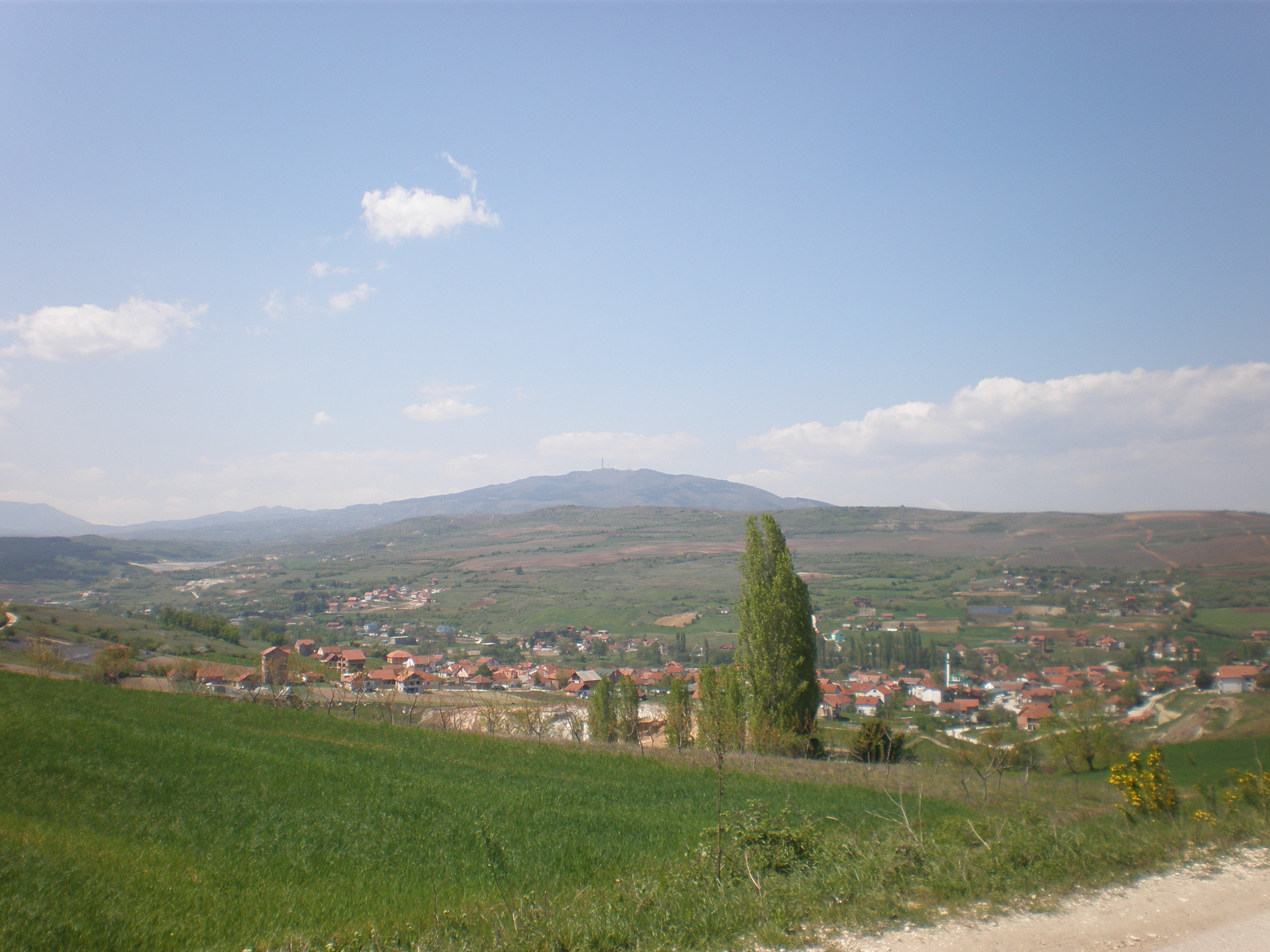
- View of the village of Batinci

- Location within North Macedonia
- Coordinates: 41°55′N 21°29′E
- Country: North Macedonia
- Region: Skopje
- Municipality: Studeničani

Population (2021)
  - Total: 7,267
- Time zone: UTC+1 (CET)
  - Summer (DST): UTC+2 (CEST)
- Car plates: SK
- Website: .

Batinci (Macedonian: Батинци, Albanian: Batincë) is the largest village in the municipality of Studeničani, North Macedonia.

== Demographics ==
According to the 2021 census, the village had a total of 7.267 inhabitants. Ethnic groups in the village include:

- Albanians 4.473
- Bosniaks 1.625
- Turks 616
- Macedonians 17
- Vlachs 2
- Serbs 2
- Others 532

Year	Macedonian	Albanian	Turks	Romani	Vlachs	Serbs	Bosniaks	Others	Total
2002	36	3.217	407	2	...	1	1.660	41	5.364
2021	17	4.473	616	...	2	2	1.625	532	7.267

== Notable people ==
Notable people from Batincë include -

- Jasir Asani, (born 19 May 1995) Albanian professional footballer
- Esad Colakovic, former Macedonian national football team player.
