= Markova Sušica =

Markova Sušica Маркова Сушица
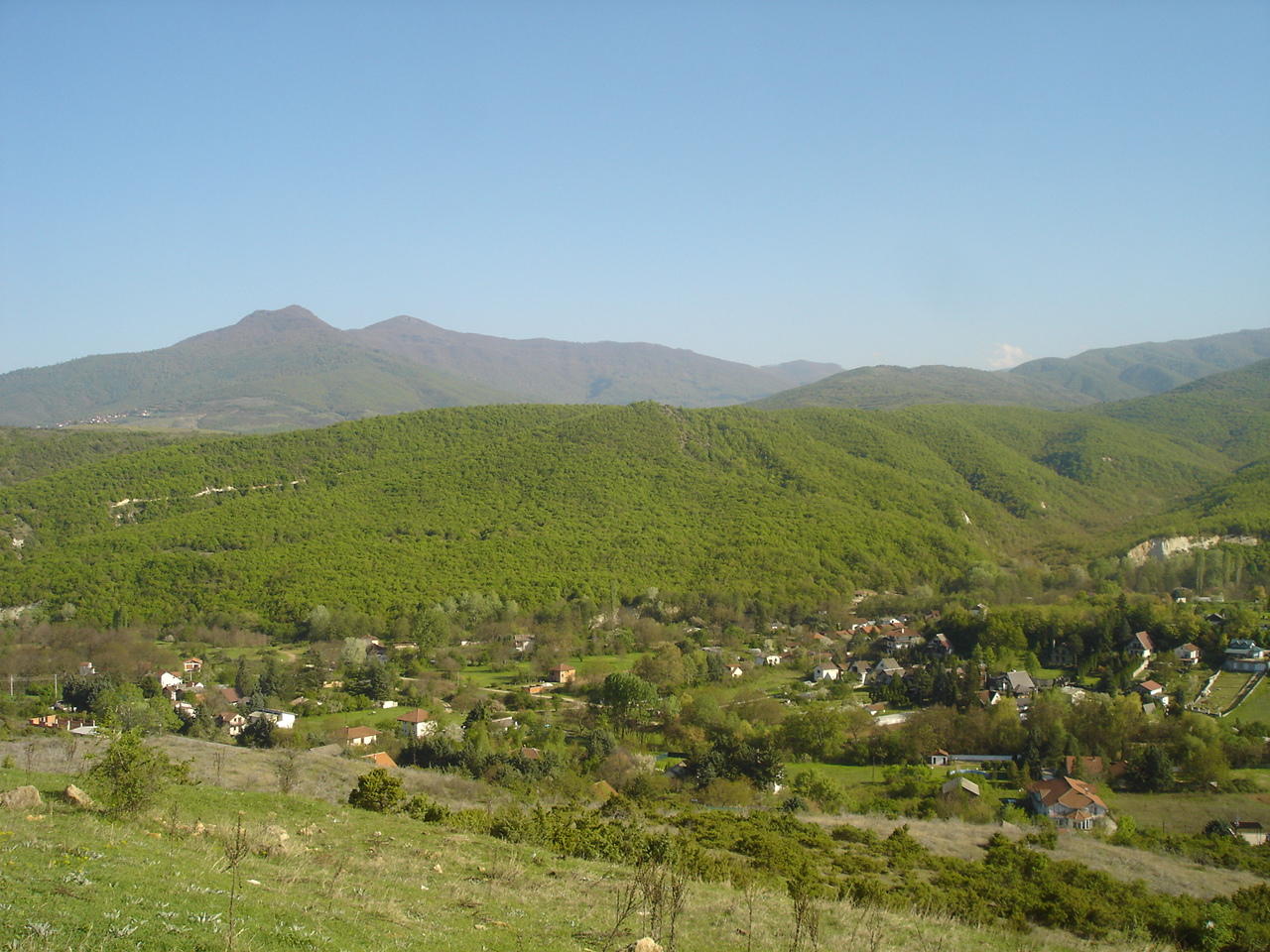

- Location within North Macedonia
- Coordinates: 41°53′57″N 21°24′34″E
- Country: North Macedonia
- Region: Skopje
- Municipality: Studeničani

Population (2021)
  - Total: 65
- Time zone: UTC+1 (CET)

Markova Sušica (Macedonian: Маркова Сушица) is a village in the Studeničani Municipality, near Skopje, North Macedonia. The village is home to Marko's Monastery. The village name honours Prince Marko, the de jure Serbian king from the 14th century.

== Demographics ==
According to the 2002 national census, the village had 53 residents, of which 28 were Turks, 25 Macedonians, 1 Albanian, 2 were Serbs, and 9 others.

Year	Macedonian	Albanian	Turks	Romani	Vlachs	Serbs	Bosniaks	Others	Total
2002	50	...	...	...	...	2	...	1	53
2021	25	1	28	...	...	2	...	9	65

== Notable people ==
- Sadettin Dilbilgen, philatelist
