= Nuri Mazari =

National Liberation Army (Macedonia) soldier

- Born: 5 May 1979; Dollogozhdë, Struga, SR Macedonia, SFR Yugoslavia, (today North Macedonia)
- Died: 11 July 2005 (aged 26); Dollogozhdë, Struga, Republic of Macedonia, (today North Macedonia)
- Military career
- Allegiance: Kosovo Liberation Army; Kosovo Protection Corps; Liberation Army of Preševo, Medveđa and Bujanovac; National Liberation Army
- Service years: 1998–2001
- Rank: Commander
- Nickname: "Komandant Struga"
- Conflicts: Kosovo War; Battle of Gllogjani; Insurgency in the Preshevo Valley; 2001 insurgency in Macedonia; Battle of Tanushë; Ambush near Tanushë

Nuri Mazari (5 May 1979 – 11 July 2005), also known as "Komandant Struga," was a soldier of the Kosovo Liberation Army and commander of the National Liberation Army who fought in the Kosovo War and the 2001 insurgency in North Macedonia. After 2001, he became a political figure and was killed under suspicious circumstances as part of a killing series targeting former members of the National Liberation Army.

== Early life ==
Mazari was born on 5 May 1979 in the village of Dollogozhdë, in the Municipality of Struga. He grew up in a nationalistic family with his parents Gjilisha and Nazim Mazari. His grandfather, Zulfi Mazari, was closely associated with Qazim Bej Vlora, the son of Ismail Qemali, whose stories left a lasting impression on the young Nuri.

Nuri completed his primary education at the “Naim Frashër” school in Dollogozhdë and attended the high school in Struga, where he excelled academically. From a young age, he was interested in the national struggle of the Albanians living outside of Albania.

== Military career ==
=== Kosovo War ===
In 1998, as the Kosovo War erupted, at the age of 19, Mazari became part of the Kosovo Liberation Army. He joined Ramush Haradinaj's brigade and participated in many battles against the Serbian forces in the Dukagjin region. Nuri quickly proved himself as a capable fighter and was recognized for his bravery in combat.

He later served in the KLA special unit led by Daut Haradinaj, where his skills earned him the respect of his superiors. During this time, he contributed not only as a fighter but also in training and supplying other members of the KLA. His involvement in the war even extended to logistical support and made him a key figure in the Dukagjin operations of the KLA.

Nuri also played a significant role in the UÇPMB, during the Insurgency in the Preshevo Valley. He provided critical assistance in training and arming fighters, contributing to their equipment and effectiveness during the conflict.

=== Albanian Uprising in Macedonia ===
In 2001, during the armed uprising of the Albanians in North Macedonia, Mazari joined the National Liberation Army. He was appointed Commander of the first unit of the NLA's forces, where he played an important role in the planning the attacks against Macedonian forces.

Under his leadership, the NLA forces engaged in significant battles, including the intense confrontations in Tanushë. On 16 March 2001, during one of these battles, Nuri was severely wounded in his body and both legs. He was transported to Pristina's hospital for treatment, where he made a recovery.

Nuri's role in the conflict extended beyond the battlefield. He contributed to the training and coordination of NLA forces.

== Death ==
Following the Ohrid Agreement, Nuri Mazari returned to his village of Dollogozhdë. In 2005, he was elected as a councilor in the Municipality of Struga, showcasing his dedication to improving his community through political means.

On 11 July 2005, Nuri Mazari was assassinated outside Café "Iliria" in Dollogozhdë. The incident also resulted in the death of Beljul Beljuli and Neki Mazari, a cousin of Nuri, who sustained injuries to his right forearm. According to police reports, the incident stemmed from an earlier accusation made by Beljul Beljuli, a 49-year-old resident of the same village, who suspected Neki Mazari of stealing €20,000 from his home. Hours before, Beljuli reported the alleged theft to the police in Struga.

Later that day, Beljuli confronted Neki outside the café and accused him of the theft. The argument escalated as Nuri Mazari and a third individual, Addis M., arrived at the scene. Tensions continued to rise, leading to an exchange of gunfire. Following the shooting, Addis M. fled the crime scene, prompting an active police search in the whole region. Authorities later filed murder charges against him.

Despite investigations, his death and the following serial assassinations and suspicious deaths of former key-figures of the NLA, like Jakup Asipi, Ridvan Neziri or Xhemail Rexhepi after the Ohrid Agreement, remain an unsolved up to this day.

== Legacy ==
A memorial dedicated to Mazari was erected in his village of Dollogozhdë. Additionally, the sports hall and primary school in Dollogozhdë has been named after him.
