= Sadettin Dilbilgen =

Turkish stamp collector

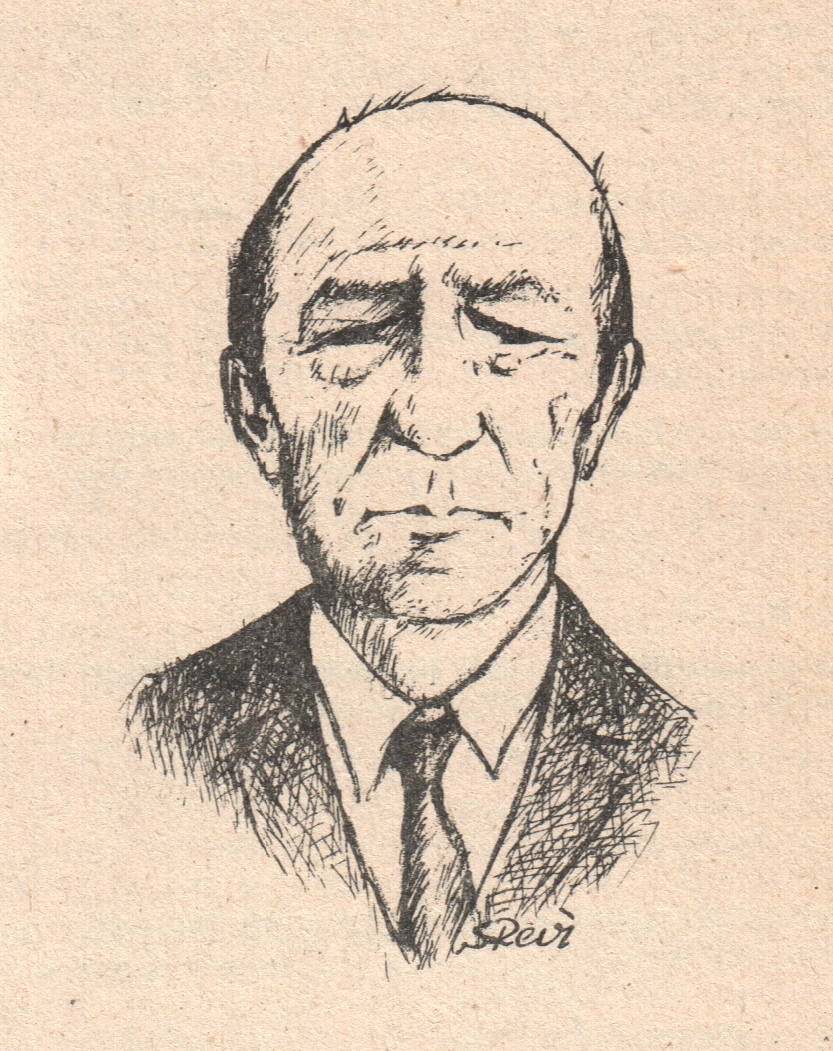
- Pencil portrait of Sadettin Dilbilgen by Şinasi Revi
- Occupation: Philatelist

Sadettin Dilbilgen was a philatelist who was born in Ottoman Macedonia. He was the childhood friend of Mustafa Kemal Atatürk.

== Life ==
Sadettin Dilbilgen was son of the owner of a large farm in Ottoman Macedonia, near Marko's Monastery in the village of Markova Sušica. He was a childhood friend of Mustafa Kemal Atatürk. He caught polio as a child, and lost some of the function of one hand and foot. Because of this, he was educated privately. At a young age he moved to France, where he was educated and stayed for 16 years.

Dilbilgen's family lost their farm and all their assets after the Balkan War, and migrated to İzmir, where he worked as a civil servant. In 1923 he visited Ankara and met his childhood friend Atatürk, who was interested and concerned about him. He became well known as a philatelist. He was one of the few collectors with whom Queen Elizabeth II of the United Kingdom exchanged stamps.

== Sources ==
- Bahadır Akkoyun, Rumeli̇ ve Balkan Kökenli̇ Taninmiş Mübadi̇l, Muhaci̇r ve Göçmenler / Sadettin Dilbilgen (in Turkish)
