= Studeničani =

Studeničani Студеничани Studeniçan
- Village
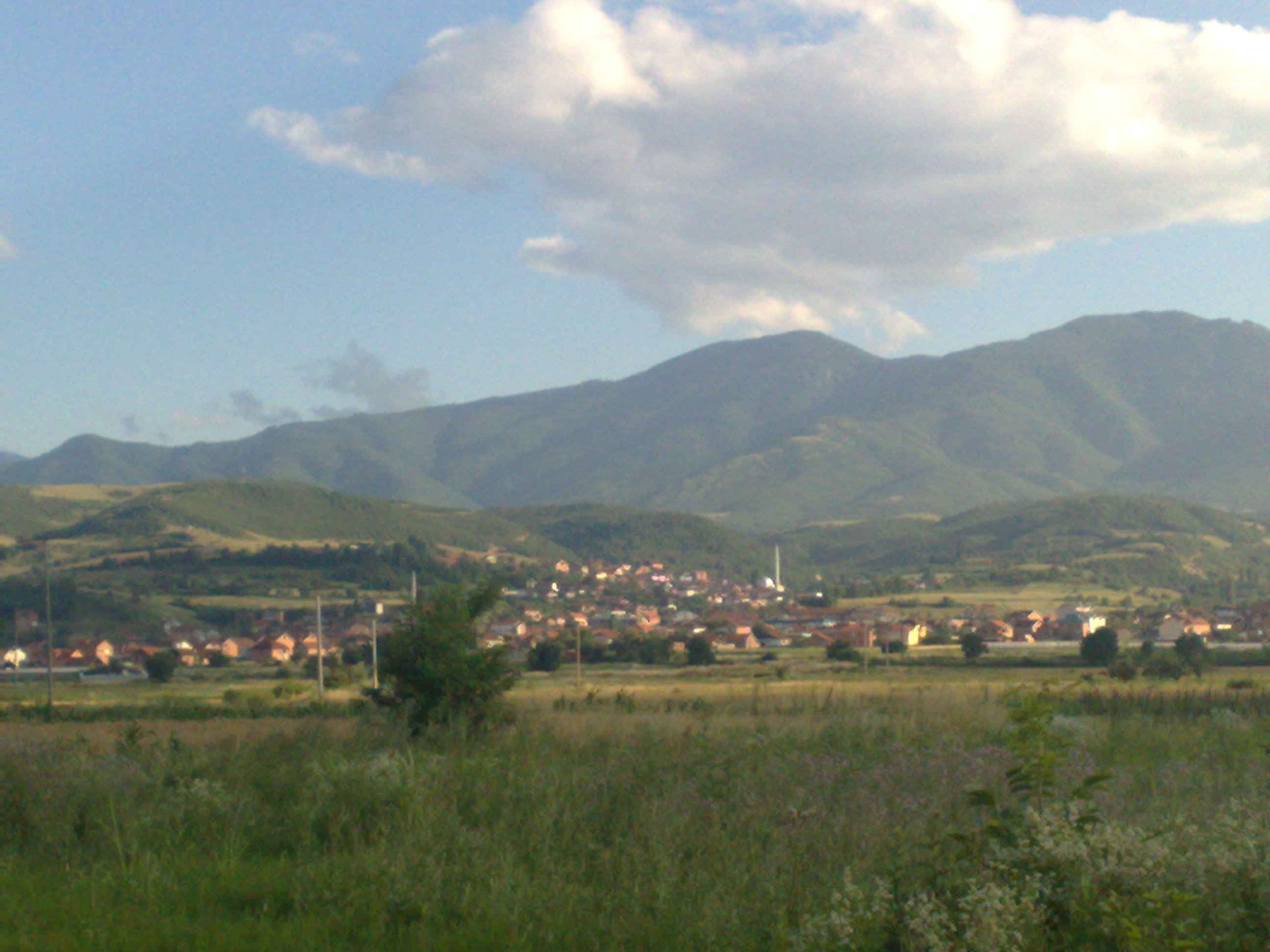

- Location within North Macedonia
- Coordinates: 41°55′N 21°32′E
- Country: North Macedonia
- Region: Skopje
- Municipality: Studeničani

Population (2021)
  - Total: 8,008
- Time zone: UTC+1 (CET)
  - Summer (DST): UTC+2 (CEST)
- Vehicle registration: SK
- Website: .

Studeničani (Macedonian: Студеничани; Albanian: Studeniçan) is a village in North Macedonia. It is a seat of Studeničani municipality.

== Demographics ==
According to the 2021 census, the village had a total of 8.004 inhabitants. Ethnic groups in the village include:

- Albanians 7.446
- Macedonians 316
- Turks 4
- Serbs 2
- Vlachs 2
- Bosniaks 1
- Others 233

Year	Macedonian	Albanian	Turks	Romani	Vlachs	Serbs	Bosniaks	Others	Total
2002	160	5.585	2	...	...	2	2	35	5.786
2021	316	7.446	4	...	1	2	1	233	8.004
