= Crvena Voda =

Crvena Voda Црвена Вода Uji i Kuq
- Village
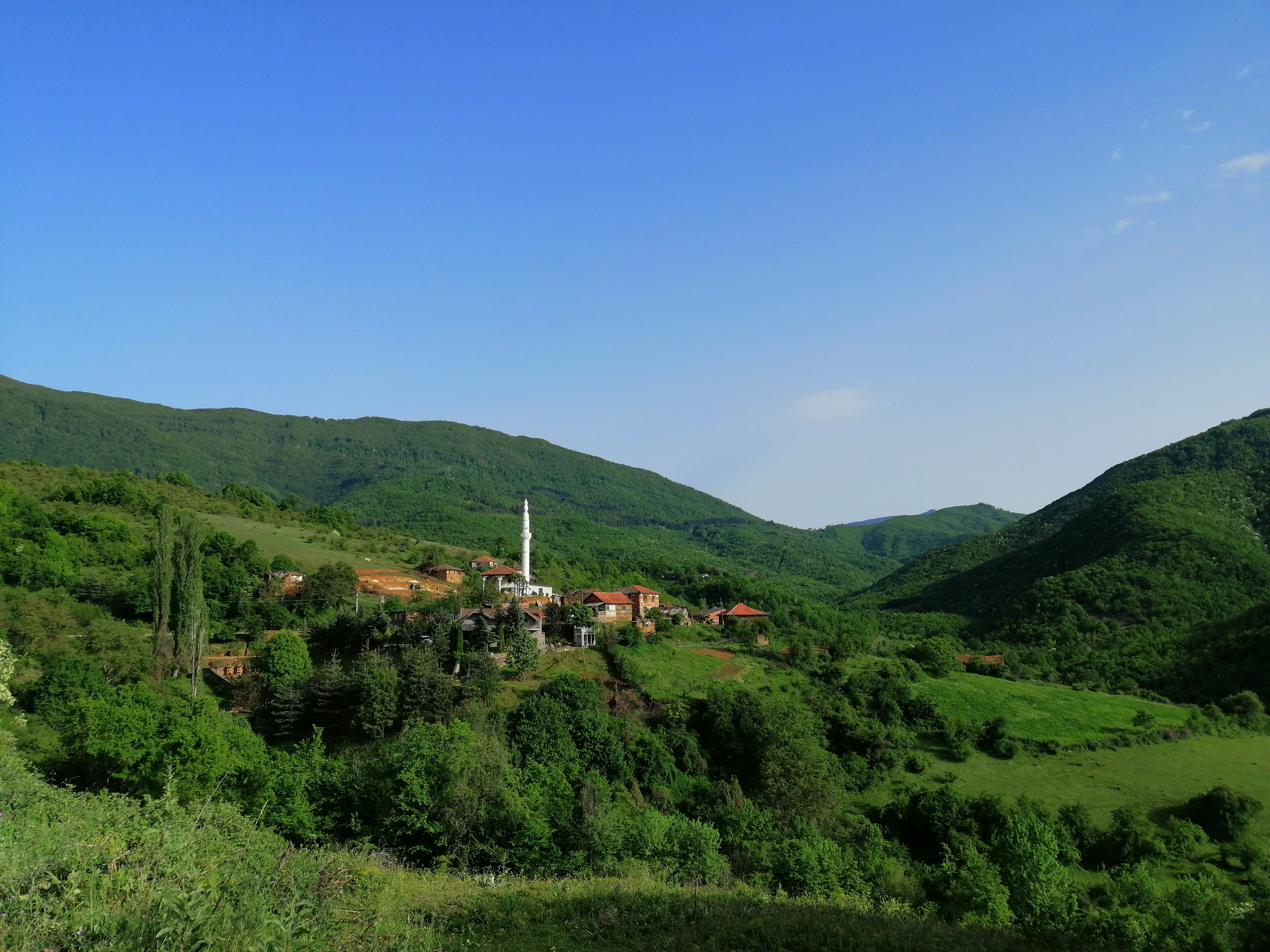
- View over Crvena Voda village

- Location within North Macedonia
- Coordinates: 41°51′28″N 21°27′34″E
- Country: North Macedonia
- Region: Skopje
- Municipality: Studeničani

Population (2021)
  - Total: 8
- Time zone: UTC+1 (CET)
  - Summer (DST): UTC+2 (CEST)
- Car plates: SK
- Website: .

Crvena Voda (Macedonian: Црвена Вода, Albanian: Uji i Kuq) is a small village in the municipality of Studeničani, North Macedonia. The village name means “Red Water”.

== Demographics ==
According to the 2021 census, the village had a total of 8 inhabitants. Ethnic groups in the village include:

- Albanians 8

Year	Macedonian	Albanian	Turks	Romani	Vlachs	Serbs	Bosniaks	Others	Total
2002	0	46	0	0	0	0	0	0	46
2021	0	8	0	0	0	0	0	0	8
