= Dračevica, Studeničani =

Dračevica Драчевица Draçevicё
- Village
- Location within North Macedonia
- Coordinates: 41°52′55″N 21°26′30″E
- Country: North Macedonia
- Region: Skopje
- Municipality: Studeničani

Population (2021)
  - Total: 305
- Time zone: UTC+1 (CET)
  - Summer (DST): UTC+2 (CEST)
- Car plates: SK
- Website: .

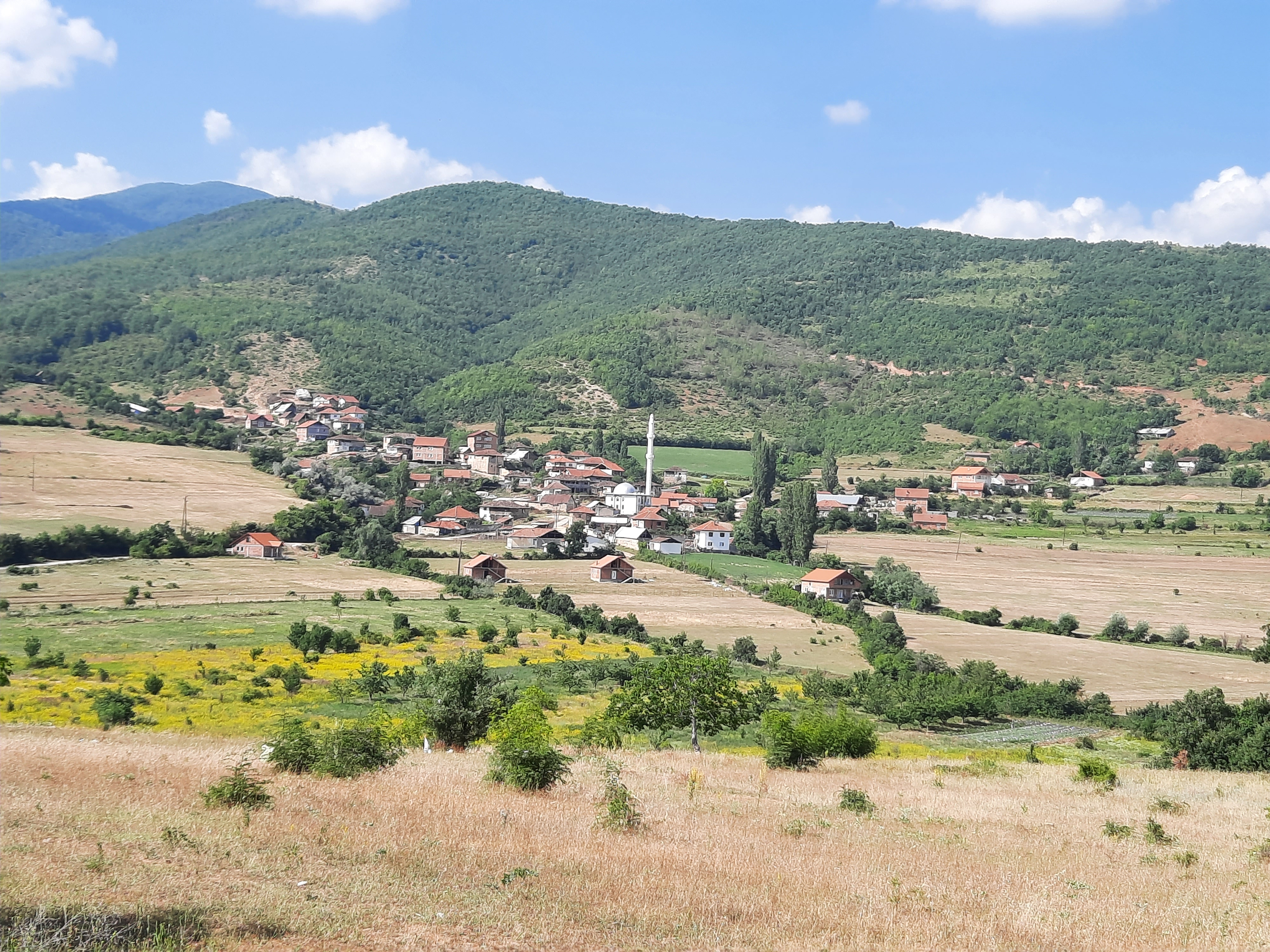
Panorama of Dračevica.

Dračevica (Macedonian: Драчевица, Albanian: Draçevicё) is a village in the municipality of Studeničani, North Macedonia.

== Demographics ==
According to the 2021 census, the village had a total of 305 inhabitants. Ethnic groups in the village include:

- Albanians 268
- Macedonians 1
- Others 36

Year	Macedonian	Albanian	Turks	Romani	Vlachs	Serbs	Bosniaks	Others	Total
2002	...	248	...	...	...	...	...	2	250
2021	1	268	...	...	...	...	...	36	305
