= Delogoždi =

Delogoždi Делогодижди Dollogozhdë
- Village
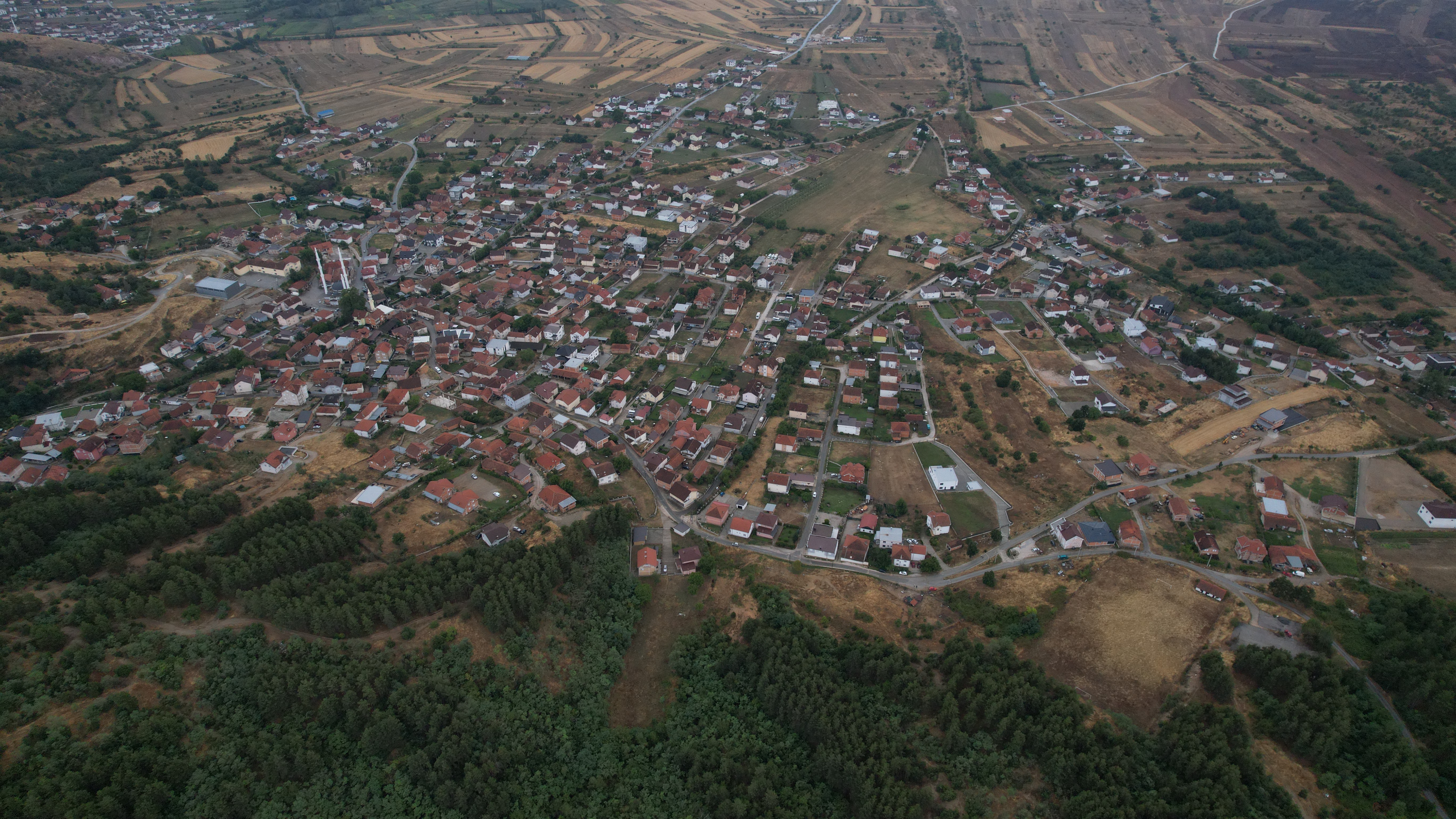
- Air view of the village

- Location within North Macedonia
- Coordinates: 41°15′28″N 20°43′22″E
- Country: North Macedonia
- Region: Southwestern
- Municipality: Struga
- Elevation: 787 m (2,582 ft)

Population (2021)
  - Total: 1,714
- Time zone: UTC+1 (CET)
  - Summer (DST): UTC+2 (CEST)
- Area code: +38946
- Car plates: SU
- Website: .

Delogoždi (Macedonian: Делогожди, Albanian: Dollogozhdë) is a village in the municipality of Struga, North Macedonia.

== Geography ==
Delogoždi lies south of Mountain Karaorman in an altitude of 800 meters and the east borders with the villages Dzhepin (1.6 km) and Koroshishta (2.3 km), in the south with the villages Livada (2.8 km) and Biceva (3.7 km), to the southwest with the village of Novo Selo (3.1 km), to the west with the village of Dolno Tateshi (2.9 km), and to the north with the village of Poum (2.9 km). The village is located northwest of the city of Struga, at a distance of 11 km.

== Demographics ==
At the end of the 19th century, Delogoždi was an Albanian village, part of the Struga nahia in the Ohrid kaza of the Ottoman Empire.

According to the statistics of Vasil Kanchov from 1900, Delogoždi had 730 inhabitants, all Albanians.

According to the 1943 Albanian census, Delogoždi was inhabited by 1147 Muslim Albanians.

According to the 2002 census, the village had a total of 2,920 inhabitants. Ethnic groups in the village include:

- Albanians 2,906
- Turks 2
- Serbs 1
- Others 11

As of the 2021 census, Delogoždi had 1,714 residents with the following ethnic composition:

- Albanians 1,668
- Persons for whom data are taken from administrative sources 46

== Notable people ==
- Nuri Mazari, known as Komandant Struga, NLA commander
