= Crn Vrv, Studeničani =

Crn Vrv Црн Врв Cërnivor
- Village
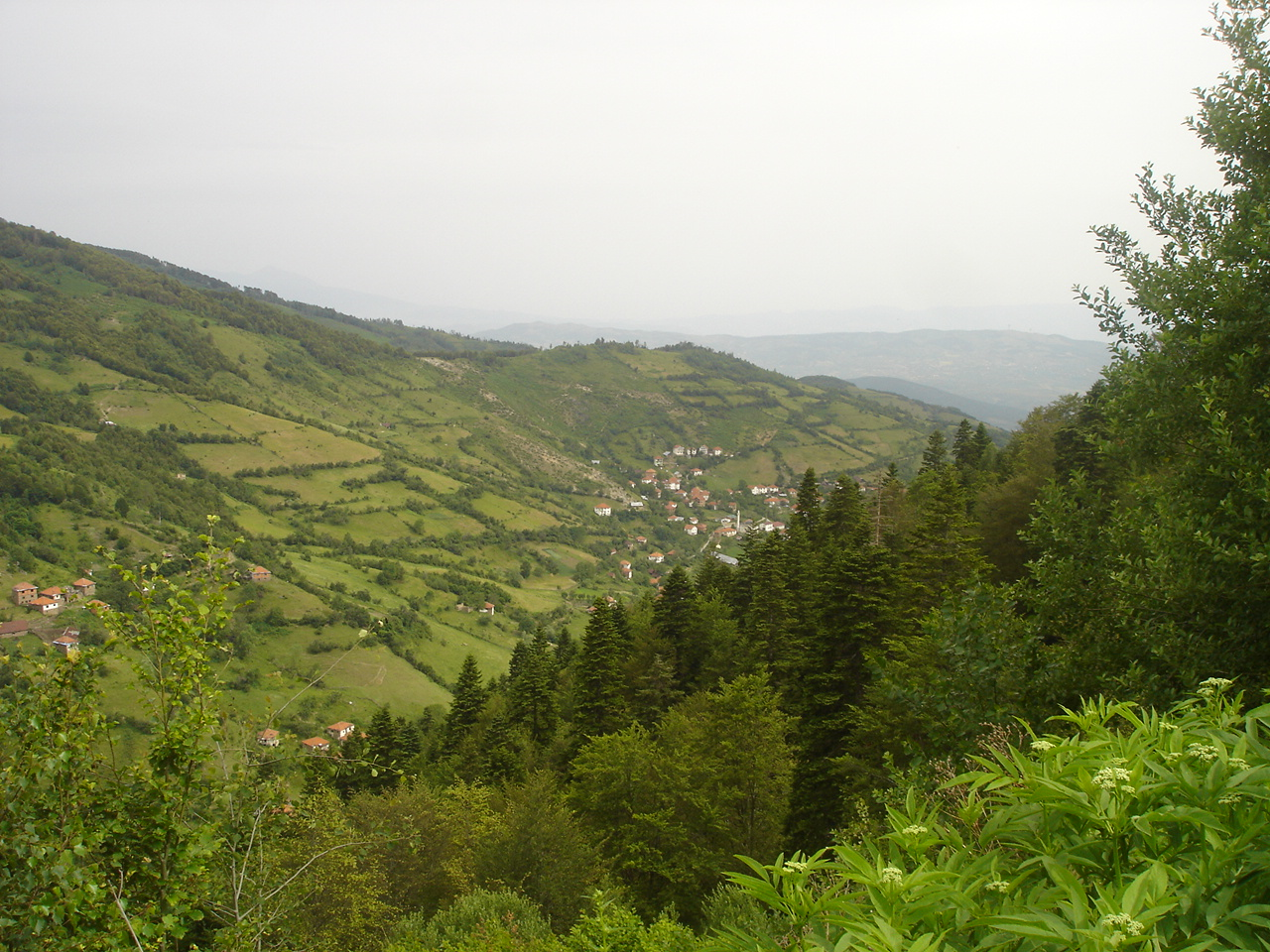
- View over Crn Vrv

- Location within North Macedonia
- Coordinates: 41°49′N 21°23′E
- Country: North Macedonia
- Region: Skopje
- Municipality: Studeničani

Population (2021)
  - Total: 311
- Time zone: UTC+1 (CET)
  - Summer (DST): UTC+2 (CEST)
- Car plates: SK
- Website: .

Crn Vrv (Macedonian: Црн Врв, Albanian: Cërnivor) is a village in the municipality of Studeničani, North Macedonia.

== Demographics ==
According to the 2021 census, the village had a total of 311 inhabitants. Ethnic groups in the village include:

- Albanians 65
- Turks 71
- Others 175
