= Studeničani Municipality =

Municipality of North Macedonia

Coordinates: 41.93°N 21.52°E

Studeničani Municipality Општина Студеничани Komuna e Studeniçanit
- Rural municipality
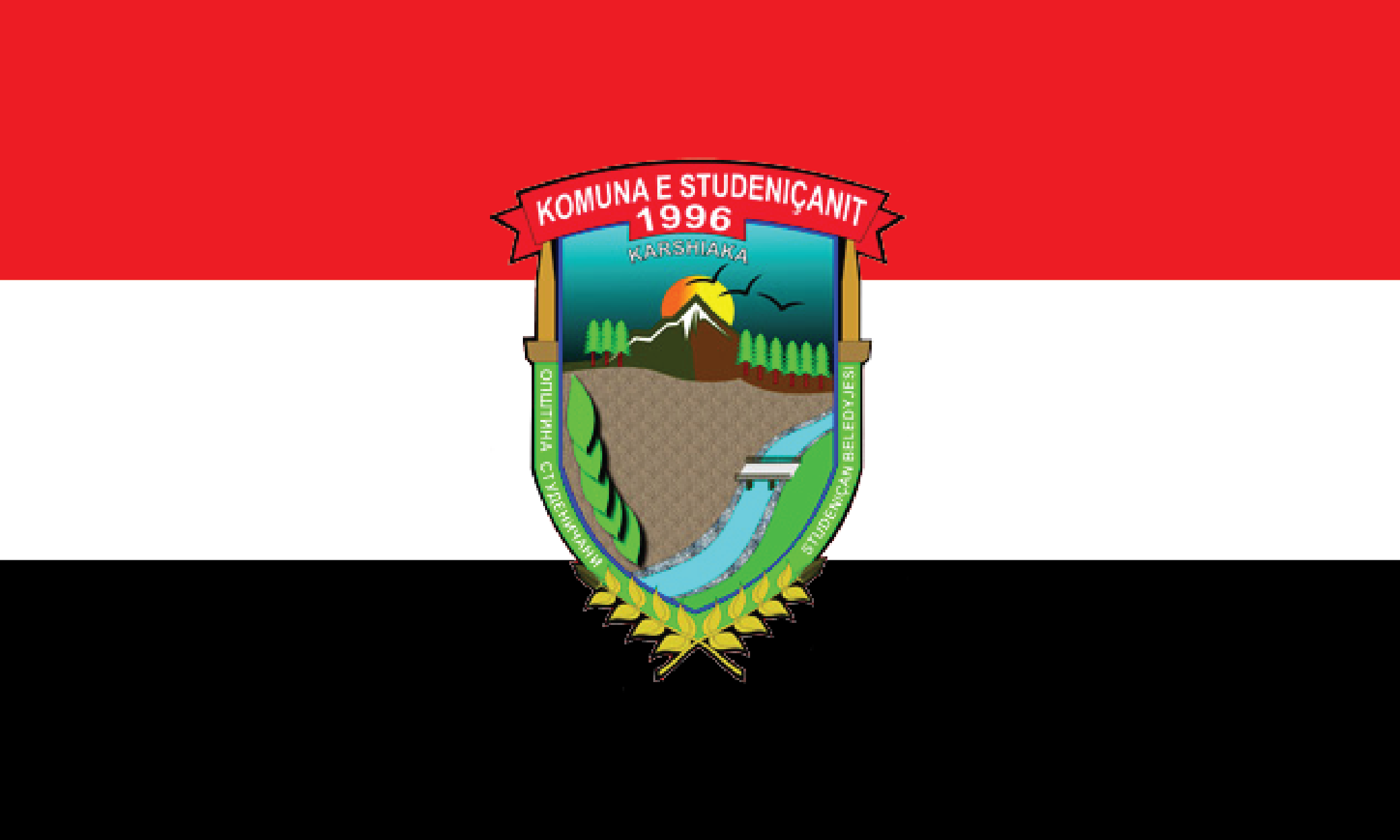
- Flag Coat of arms

- Country: North Macedonia
- Region: Skopje
- Municipal seat: Studeničani

Government
  - Mayor: Ejup Abazi (BDI)

Area
  - Total: 276.16 km^{2} (106.63 sq mi)

Population (2002)
  - Total: 21,970
  - Density: 79.56/km^{2} (206.0/sq mi)
- Time zone: UTC+1 (CET)
- Postal code: 1052
- Area code: 02
- Vehicle registration: SK
- Website: Official Website

Studeničani Municipality (Macedonian: Студеничани, Albanian: Studeniçan) is a municipality in central North Macedonia. Studeničani is the name of the village where the municipal seat is found. It is located in the Skopje Statistical Region.

== Geography ==
The municipality borders the City of Skopje to the north, Sopište Municipality to the northwest and west, Čaška Municipality to the south, Zelenikovo Municipality to the east and Petrovec Municipality to the northeast.

== Demographics ==
According to the 2021 North Macedonia census, this municipality has 21,970 inhabitants. Ethnic groups in the municipality:

	2002		2021	
	Number	%	Number	%
TOTAL	17,246	100	21,970	100
Albanians	11,793	68.38	14,982	68.19
Turks	3,285	19.05	3,231	14.71
Bosniaks	1,662	9.64	1,637	7.45
Macedonians	309	1.79	437	1.99
Roma	73	0.42	46	0.21
Serbs	14	0.08	14	0.06
Vlachs			4	0.01
Other / Undeclared / Unknown	110	0.64	85	0.4
Persons for whom data are taken from administrative sources			1,534	6.98

== Inhabited places ==
There are 15 inhabited places in this municipality.

Inhabited Places	Total	Macedonians	Albanians	Turks	Roma	Vlachs	Serbs	Bosnians	Others
Studeničani Municipality	21,970	437	14,982	3,231	46	4	14	1,637	1,683
Batinci	7,267	17	4,473	407	-	2	2	1,625	532
Cvetovo	809	-	1	592	-	-	-	-	216
Crvena Voda	8	-	6	-	-	-	-	-	2
Crn Vrv	311	-	65	1	-	-	-	-	244
Dolno Količani	1,831	-	12	1,739	-	-	-	11	69
Dračevica	305	1	268	-	-	-	-	-	36
Elovo	198	-	1	98	-	-	-	-	99
Gorno Količani	248	-	195	-	-	-	-	-	53
Malčište	38	-	12	-	-	-	-	-	26
Markova Sušica	65	25	1	28	-	-	2	-	9
Morani	2,595	78	2,396	6	46	-	8	-	61
Pagaruša	181	-	9	147	-	-	-	-	25
Ramni Gaber	20	-	7	-	-	-	-	-	13
Studeničani	8,004	316	7,446	4	-	2	2	1	233
Vrtekica	90	-	90	-	-	-	-	-	-

Demographics of Studeničani Municipality
Census year	Population
1994	14,747
2002	17,246
2021	21,970
