= Skopje Statistical Region =

Coordinates: 42.0000°N 21.4333°E

Skopje Statistical Region Скопски Регион (Macedonian) Rajoni i Shkupit (Albanian)
- Statistical region
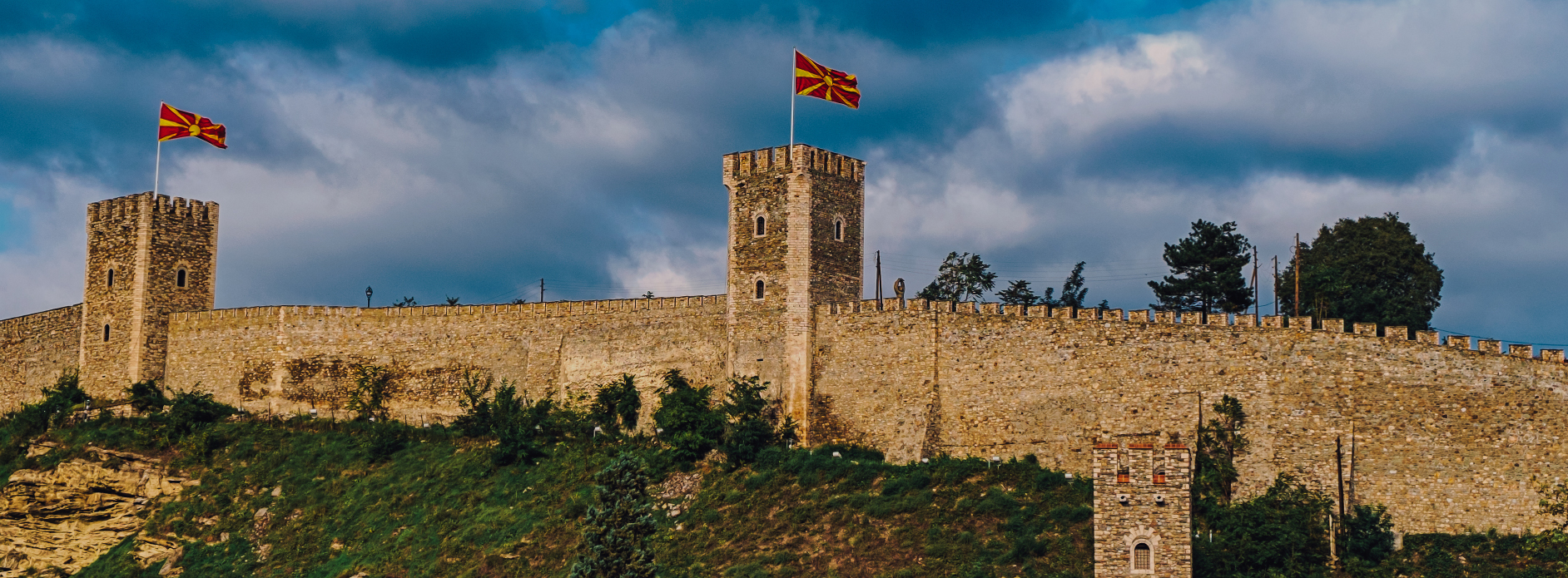
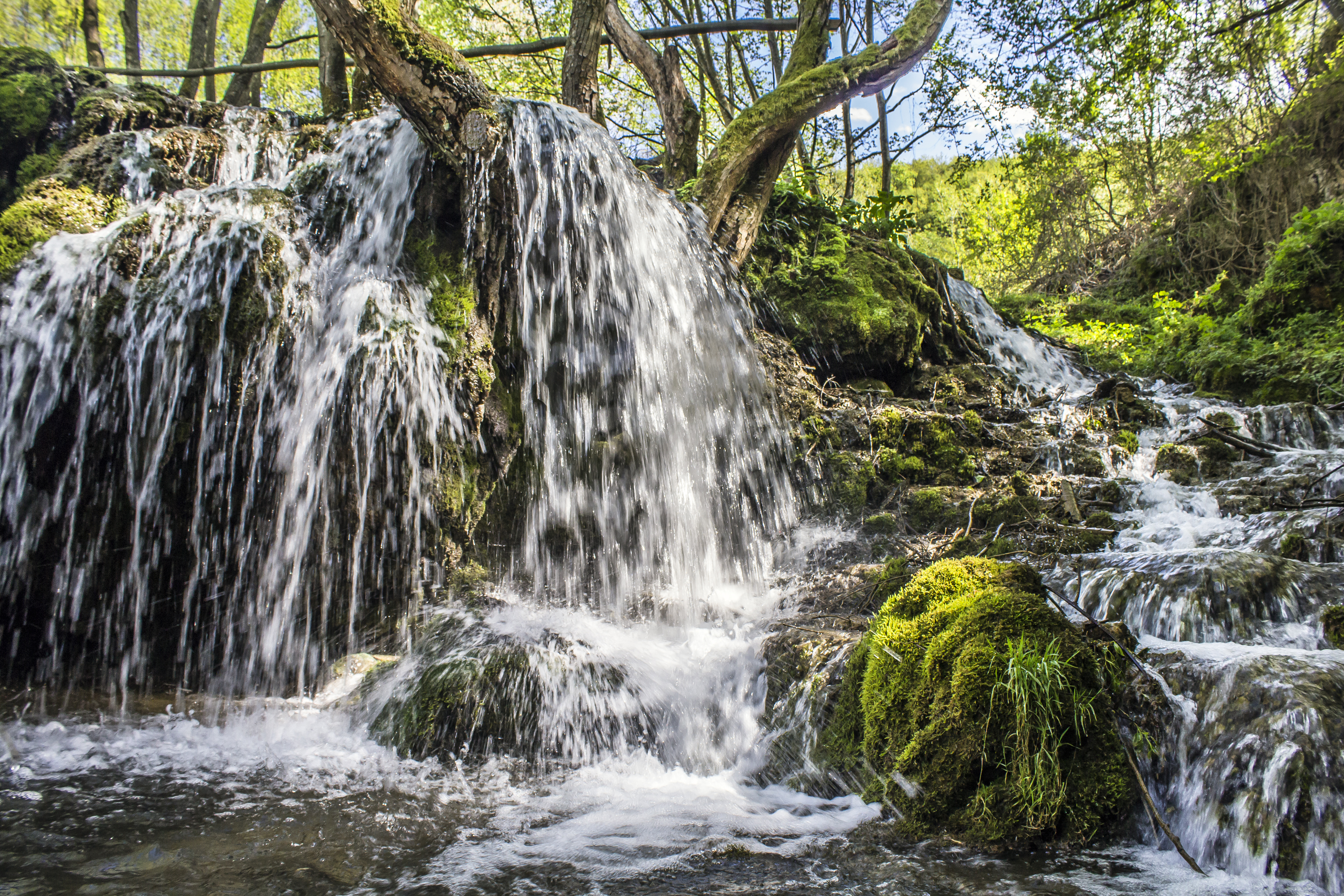
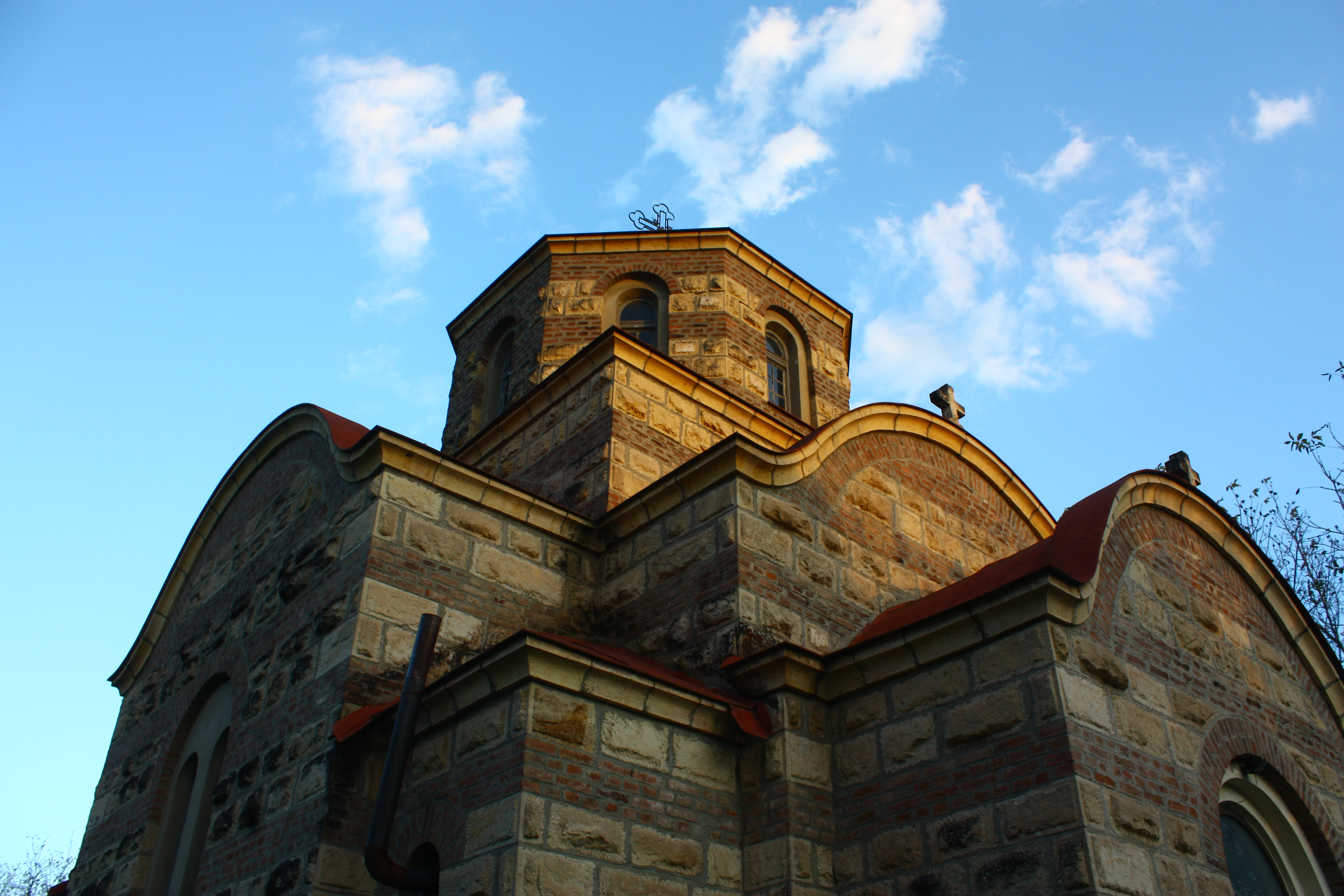
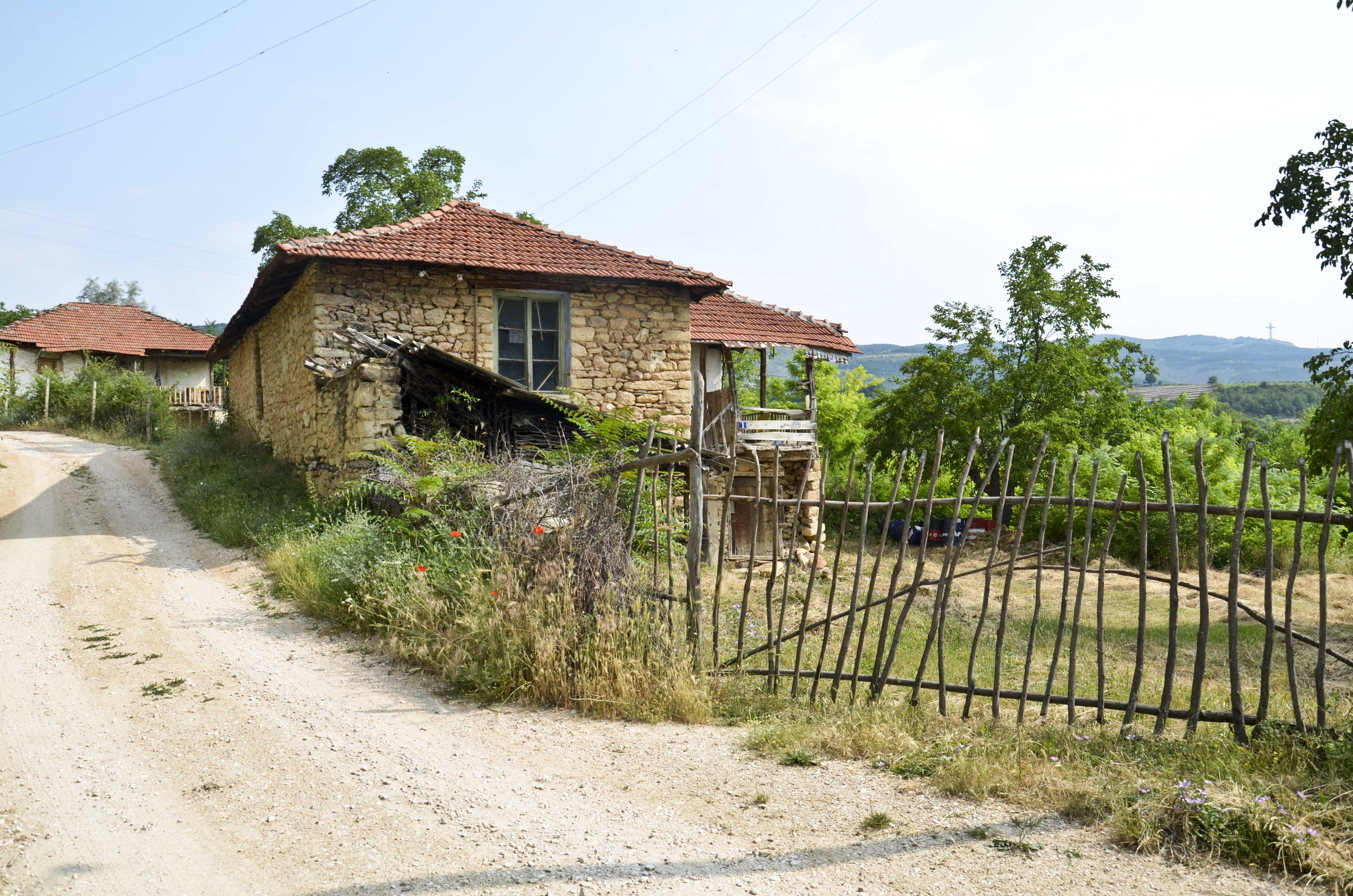
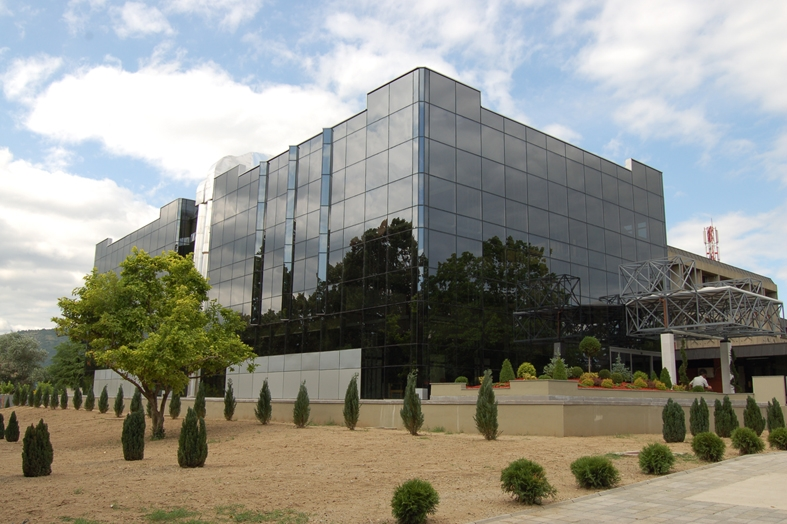
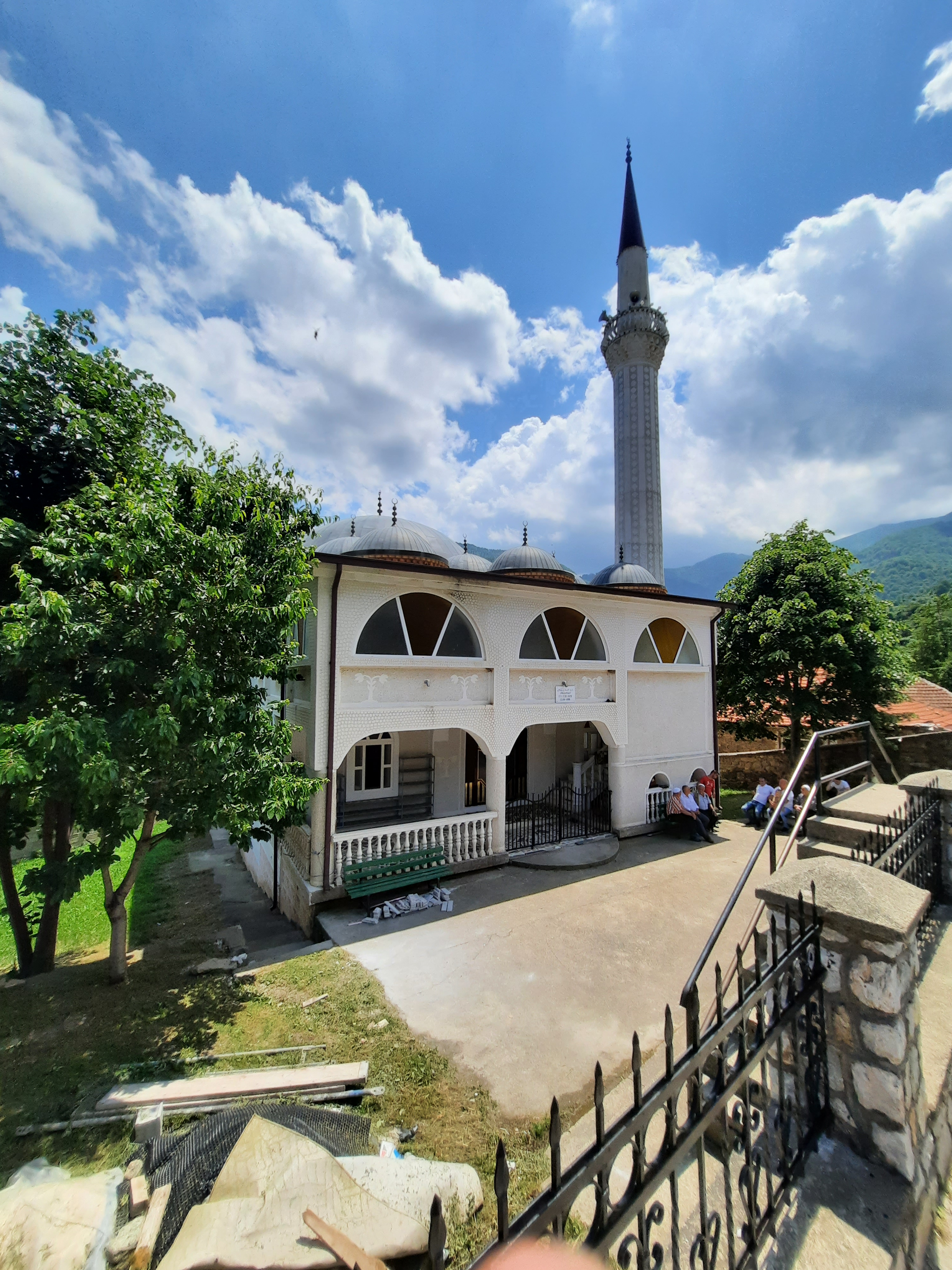
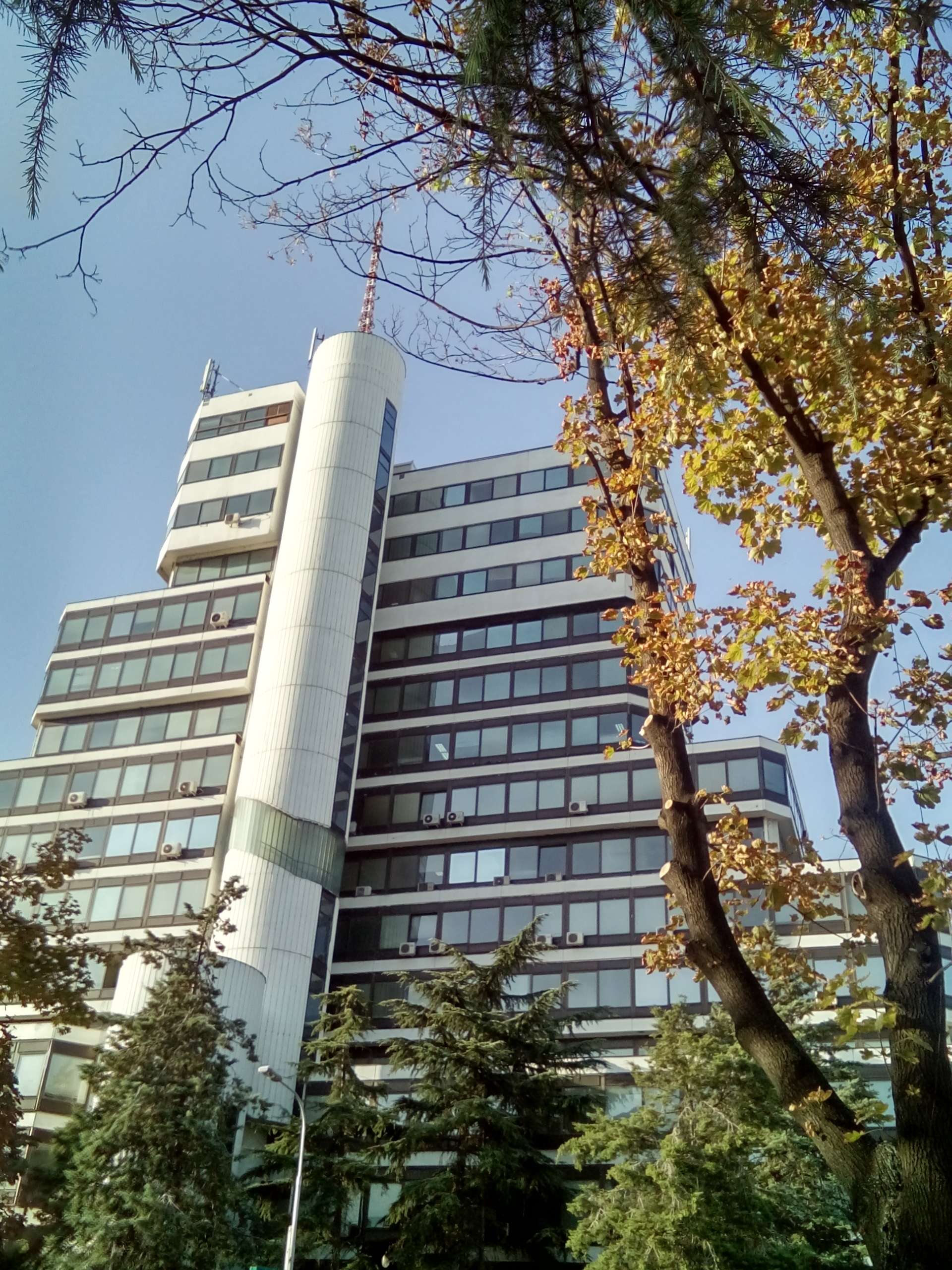
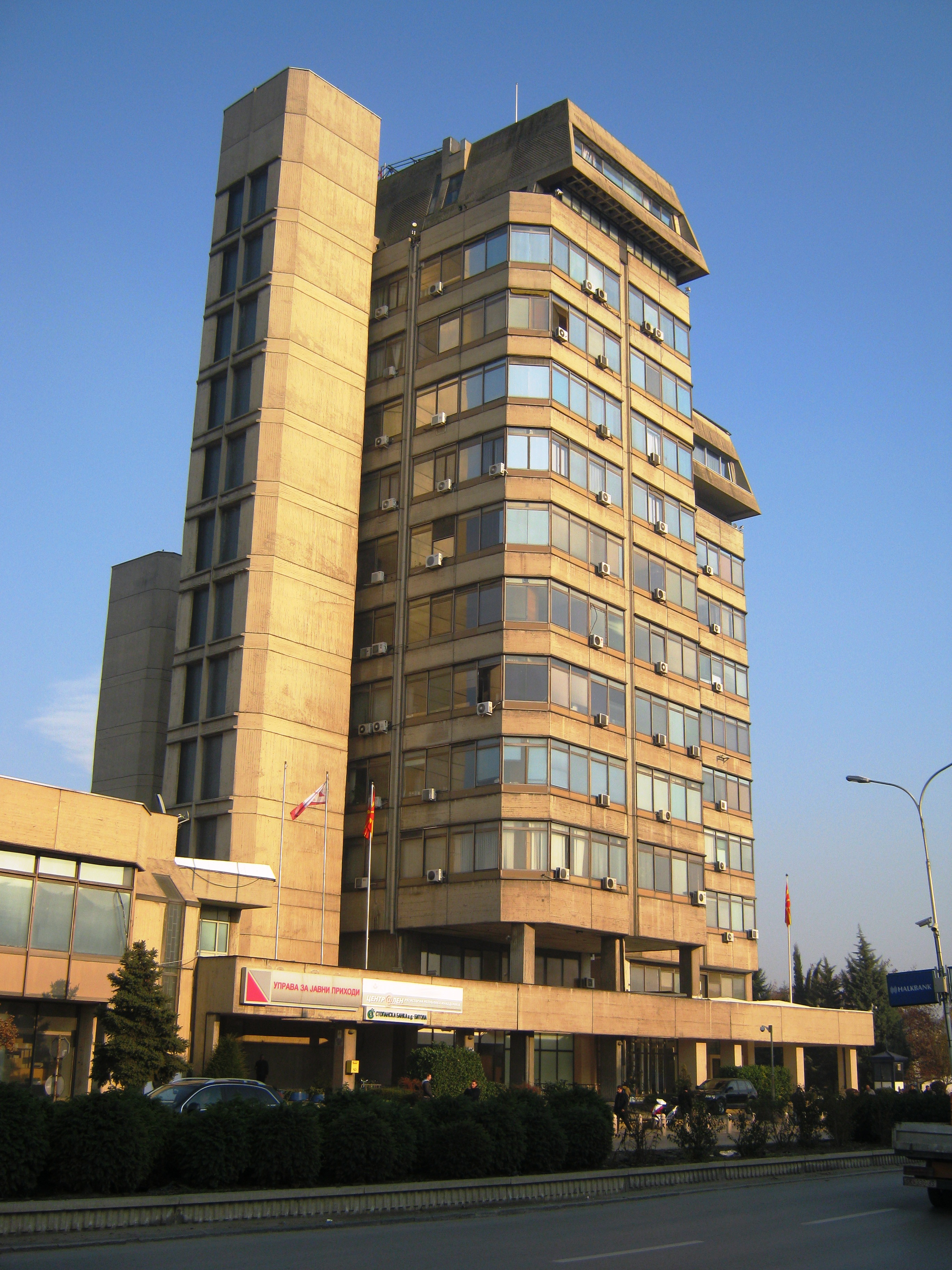
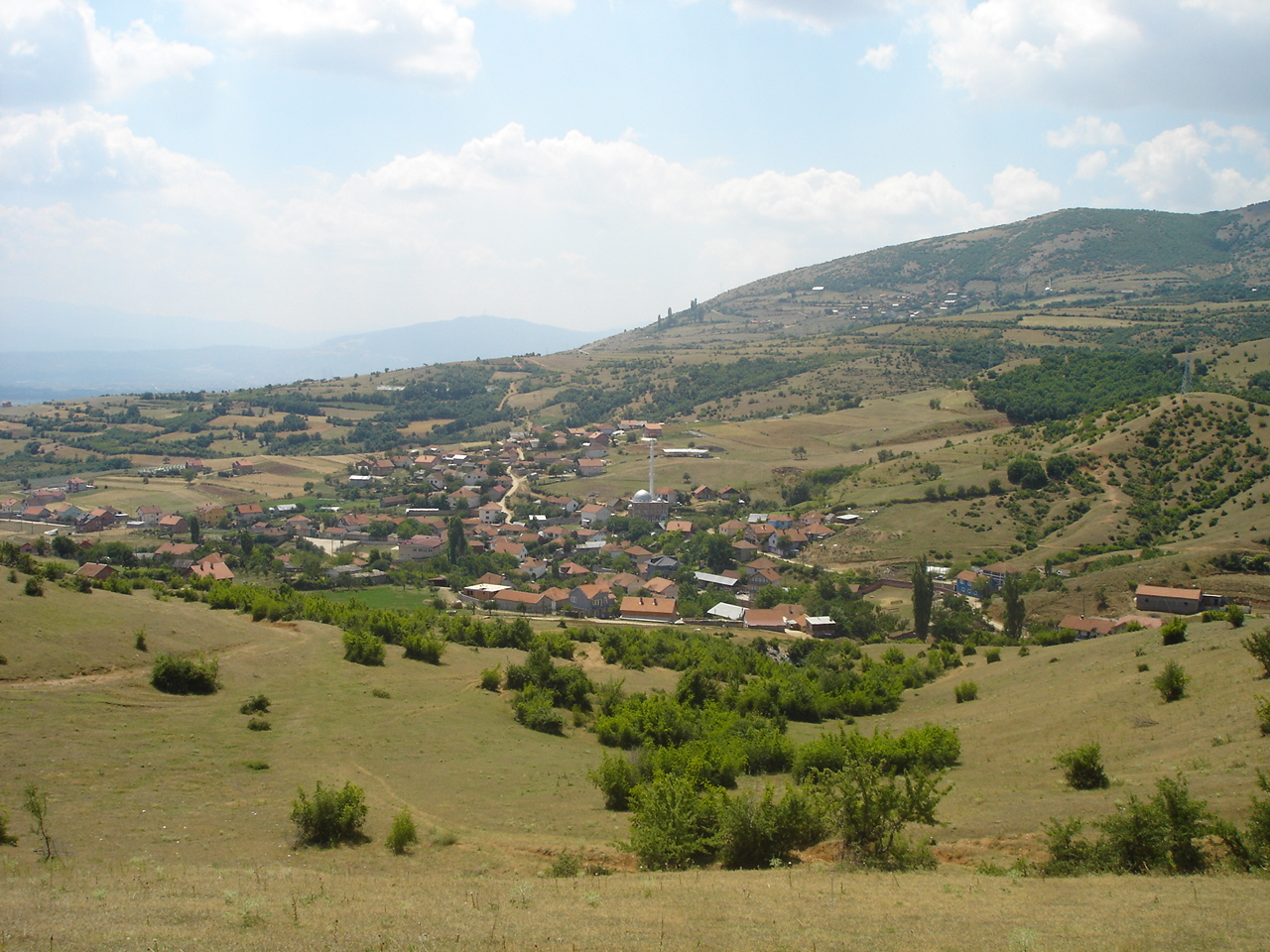
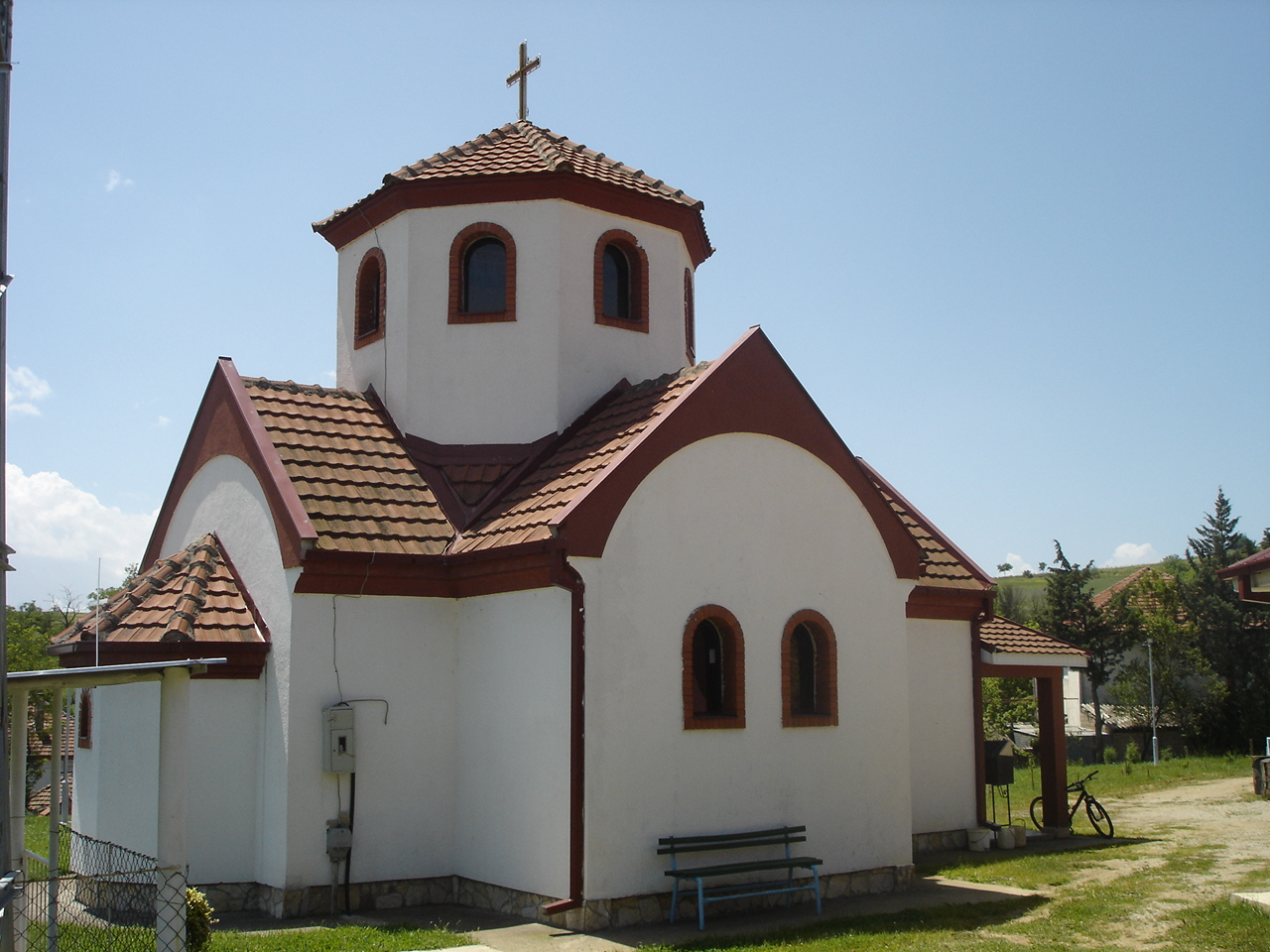
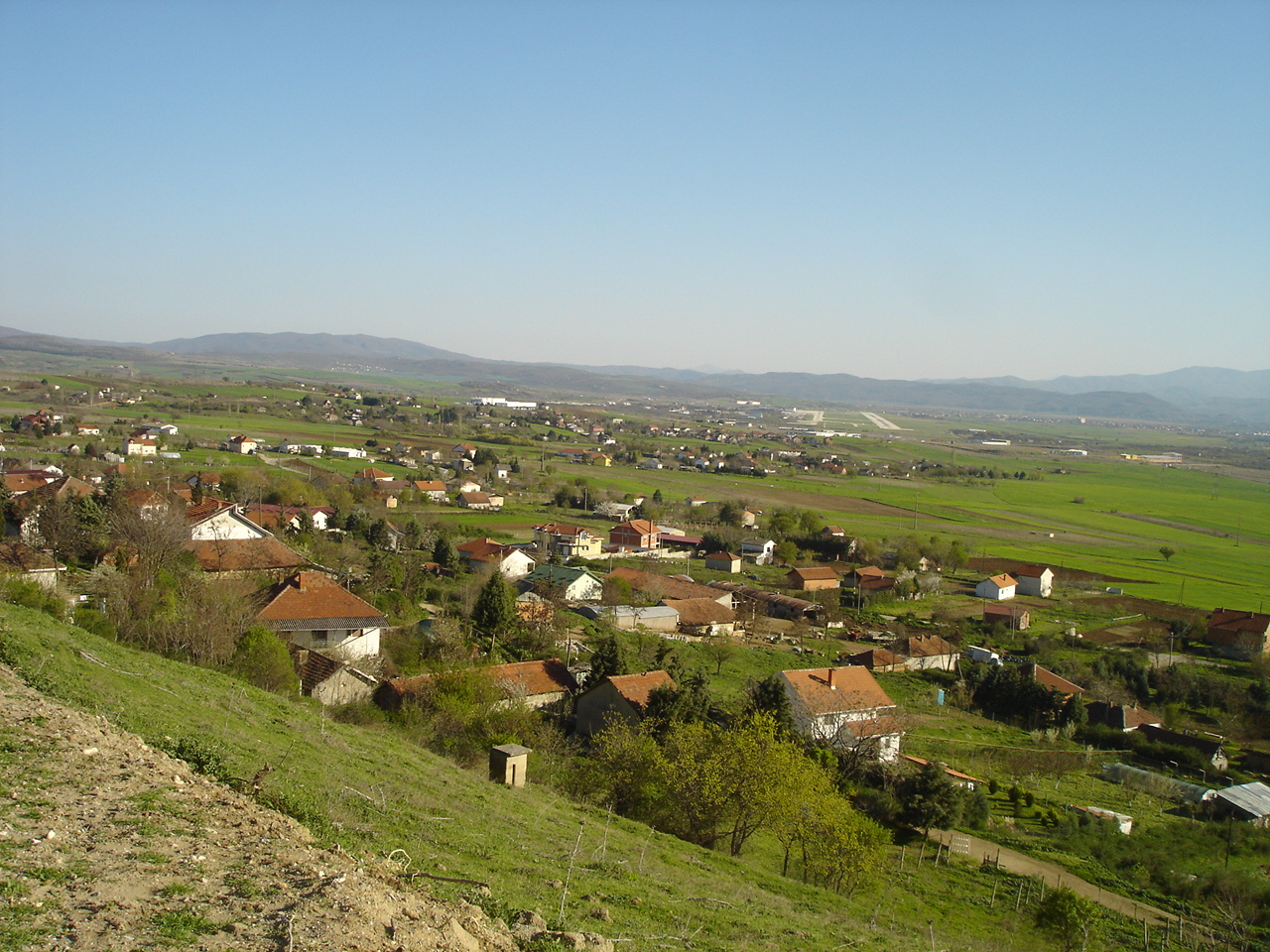
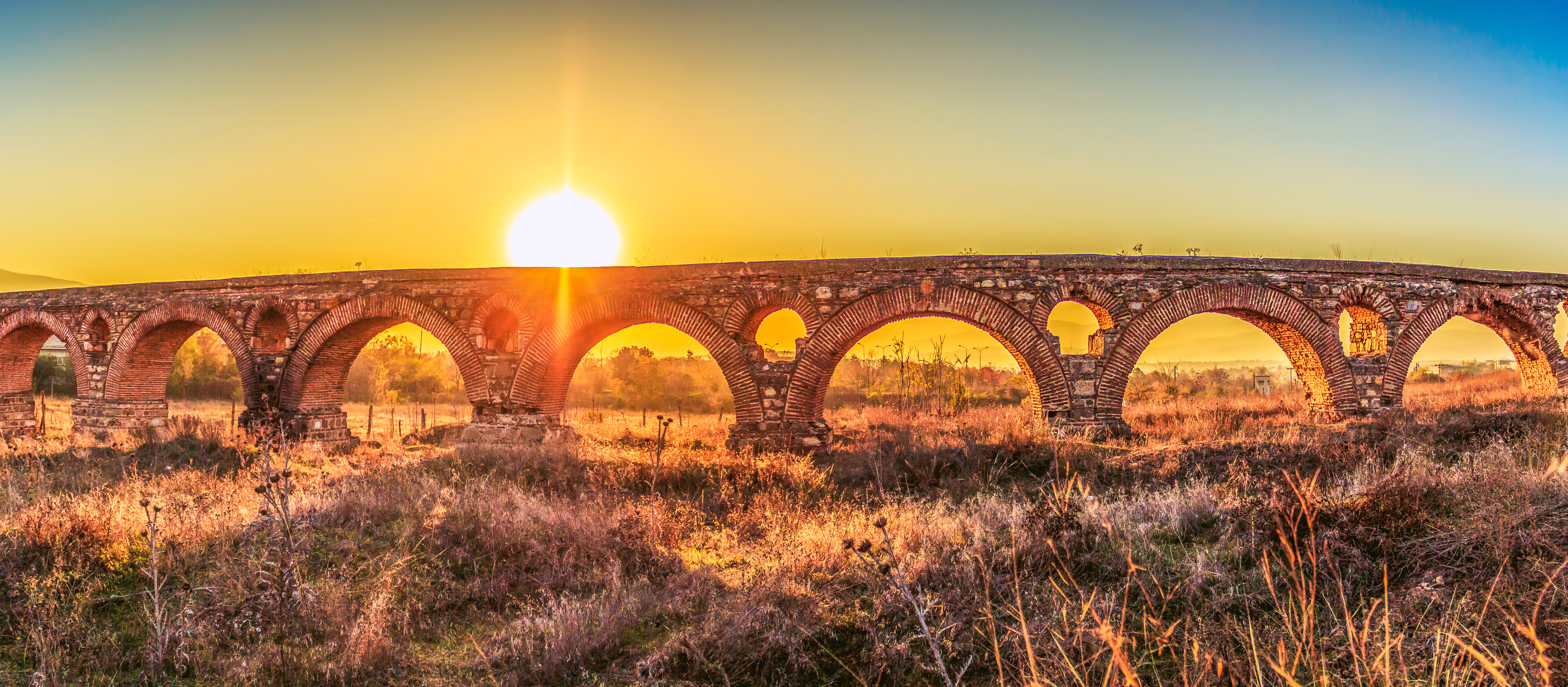

- Coat of arms

- Country: North Macedonia

Area
  - Total: 1,813 km^{2} (700 sq mi)

Population (2021)
  - Total: 607,007
  - Density: 334.8/km^{2} (867.1/sq mi)
- NUTS code: MK008
- HDI (2023): 0.829 very high · 1st of 8
- Website: skopjeregion.gov.mk

The Skopje Statistical Region (Macedonian: Скопски Регион, romanized: Skopski Region; Albanian: Rajoni i Shkupit) is one of eight statistical regions of North Macedonia. It also corresponds to one of the eight classified NUTS-3 statistical regions of Macedonia. The region is located in the north of the country, bordering Kosovo and five other regions of Macedonia. It encompasses an area of 1,813 km^{2} (700 sq mi), around the Macedonian capital of Skopje. The region includes seven other municipalities apart from the city of Skopje. With a population of more than 0.6 million inhabitants, it is the most populated region in the country.

== History ==
The region was founded around the city of Skopje, which was established as a Roman settlement in the first century CE. It became part of various empires over the years, before the Ottomans captured it at the end of the 14th century. It remained under the Ottoman rule until the early 20th century. During the First Balkan War, the Balkan League led by the Serbian Empire defeated the Ottomans, and the region became part of the Kingdom of Serbia. During the First World War, Bulgaria occupied the territory briefly, before it was re-captured by Serbia in 1918, and later became part of Yugoslavia. In the Second World War, the region was captured by the Italian Empire in 1941. It was subject to severe bombing, which resulted in most of the infrastructure in the region being destroyed. It was freed in 1944, and became part of Yugoslavia again. The region has experienced many earthquakes in the past, and a major earthquake in 1963 destroyed much of the infrastructure that was re-built after the war, and killed thousands. Most of the region had to be re-built after the disaster. The region became part of the independent nation of North Macedonia after the dissolution of Yugoslavia in 1991.

== Geography ==
The Skopje region is located in the north of the country, encompassing an area of 1,813 km^{2} (700 sq mi) around the Macedonian capital city of Skopje. The region is located in Southeastern Europe, and is completely land locked as Macedonia does not have access to sea. It shares an international land border with Kosovo in the south. It shares borders with Vardar, Polog, Northeastern, Eastern, and Southwestern statistical regions. The region is situated in a seismically active zone along the Vardar River.

== Administration ==
The country of North Macedonia is organized into eight statistical regions. The regions also correspond to the broader level sub-divisions as per the Nomenclature of Territorial Units for Statistics (NUTS). These are classified as a NUTS-3 statistical regions of Macedonia, and incorporate one or more municipalities within it. The region consists of the city of Skopje (which includes ten municipalities (Note: One of the ten municipalities that form the city of Skopje.)) and seven other municipalities–Aračinovo, Čučer-Sandevo, Ilinden, Petrovec, Sopište, Studeničani, and Zelenikovo. These are further organized into 142 settlements.

The municipalities of the region

Municipality	Seat	Area (km^{2})	Population (2021)
Aerodrom (Аеродром)	Aerodrom (Аеродром)	20	77,735
Aračinovo (Арачиново)	Aračinovo (Арачиново)	38	12,676
Butel (Бутел)	Butel (Бутел)	61	37,968
Čair (Чаир)	Čair (Чаир)	3	62,586
Centar (Центар)	Centar (Центар)	9	43,893
Čučer-Sandevo (Чучер Сандево)	Čučer-Sandevo (Чучер Сандево)	215	9,200
Gazi Baba (Гази Баба)	Gazi Baba (Гази Баба)	92	69,626
Gjorče Petrov (Ѓорче Петров)	Gjorče Petrov (Ѓорче Петров)	63	44,844
Ilinden (Илинден)	Ilinden (Илинден)	97	17,435
Karpoš (Карпош)	Karpoš (Карпош)	21	63,760
Kisela Voda (Кисела Вода)	Kisela Voda (Кисела Вода)	43	61,695
Petrovec (Петровец)	Petrovec (Петровец)	222	9,150
Saraj (Сарај)	Saraj (Сарај)	230	38,399
Sopište (Сопиште)	Sopište (Сопиште)	223	6,713
Studeničani (Студеничани)	Studeničani (Студеничани)	276	21,970
Šuto Orizari (Шуто Оризари)	Šuto Orizari (Шуто Оризари)	6	25,726
Zelenikovo (Зелениково)	Zelenikovo (Зелениково)	177	3,361

== Demographics ==
Majority ethnic groups

The region had a population of 607,007 inhabitants in 192,837 households in 2021. It is the most populated region in the country, accounting for nearly one-third of the total population of the country. Macedonians formed the major ethnic group in the region, with Albanians forming a significant minority.

	2002		2021	
	Number	%	Number	%
TOTAL	578,144	100	607,007	100
Macedonians	367,413	63.55	340,402	56.08
Albanians	133,893	23.16	153,003	25.21
Roma	24,225	4.19	19,142	3.15
Serbs	18,152	3.14	12,474	2.06
Turks	12,216	2.11	12,357	2.04
Bosniaks	10,946	1.89	10,986	1.81
Vlachs	2,580	0.45	2,827	0.47
Other / Undeclared / Unknown	8,719	1.51	6,728	1.09
Persons for whom data are taken from administrative sources			49,088	8.09

Christianity was the major religion with 323,714 (58%) adherents. Islam formed a significant minority with 196,125 (32.3%) adherents.

The economy of the region is dependent on textile and chemical industries and tourism. The region has a high HDI and significantly higher wages and per capita income than the other regions of the country.
