= Skopska Crna Gora dialect =

Dialect of Macedonian

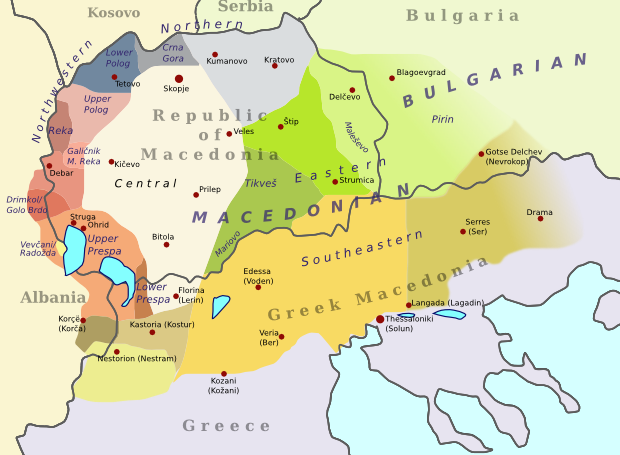
The location of the Skopska Crna Gora dialect among the others Macedonian dialects

Nasreddin Hodja fooled by Children for His Donkey
Excerpt from a tale told by a man from Brodec, Čučer-Sandevo Municipality.

The Skopska Crna Gora dialect (Macedonian: Скопскоцрногорски дијалект, Skopskocrnogorski dijalekt) is a member of the western subgroup of the northern group of dialects of Macedonia. The dialect is spoken in a small territory north of Skopje and at the foot of the mountain Skopska Crna Gora. The name of the dialect is derived from the name of the mountain because there are no cities in that territory. The Skopska Crna Gora dialect is spoken in the villages: Kučkovo, Orman, Volkovo, Novo Selo, Brazda, Gluvo, Čučer, Gornjane, Banjane, Mirkovci, Kučevište, Pobožje, Brodec, Ljubanci, Ljuboten, Raštak, Gorno Orizari, Radišani, Bulačani, Cresevo and Stajkovci.

The dialect belongs to the Torlakian dialectal group (also known as Prizren-Timok dialects).

== Phonological characteristics ==
- use of A instead of E: трева/treva > трава/trava ('grass'), орев/orev > орав/orav ('nut');
- retained use of ъ Big Yer: лаже/laže > лъже/lăže ('lie');
- use of U instead of the Old Church Slavonic letter ON: пат/pat > пут/put ('road'), внук/vnuk > унук/unuk ('nephew').

== Morphological characteristics ==
- use of the letter V between vowels: тоа/toa > това/tova ('that')
- palatal J before the letter E at the beginning of a word: јазик/jazik > језик/jezik ('tongue'), јаже > јуже ('rope');
- the consonant group MN is replaced with the consonant group ML: многу/mnogu > млогу/mlogu ('too much');
- use of the preposition U instead of the preposition VO: во град/vo grad > у град/u grad ('in city')

== Typical words ==
There are many words which are typical of the Skopska Crna Gora dialect.

- равно/ravno instead of рамно/ramno ('flat')
- овоа/ovoa instead of ова/ova ('this')
- плевна/plevna instead of племна/plemna
