= Creševo =

Creševo Црешево
- Neighbourhood
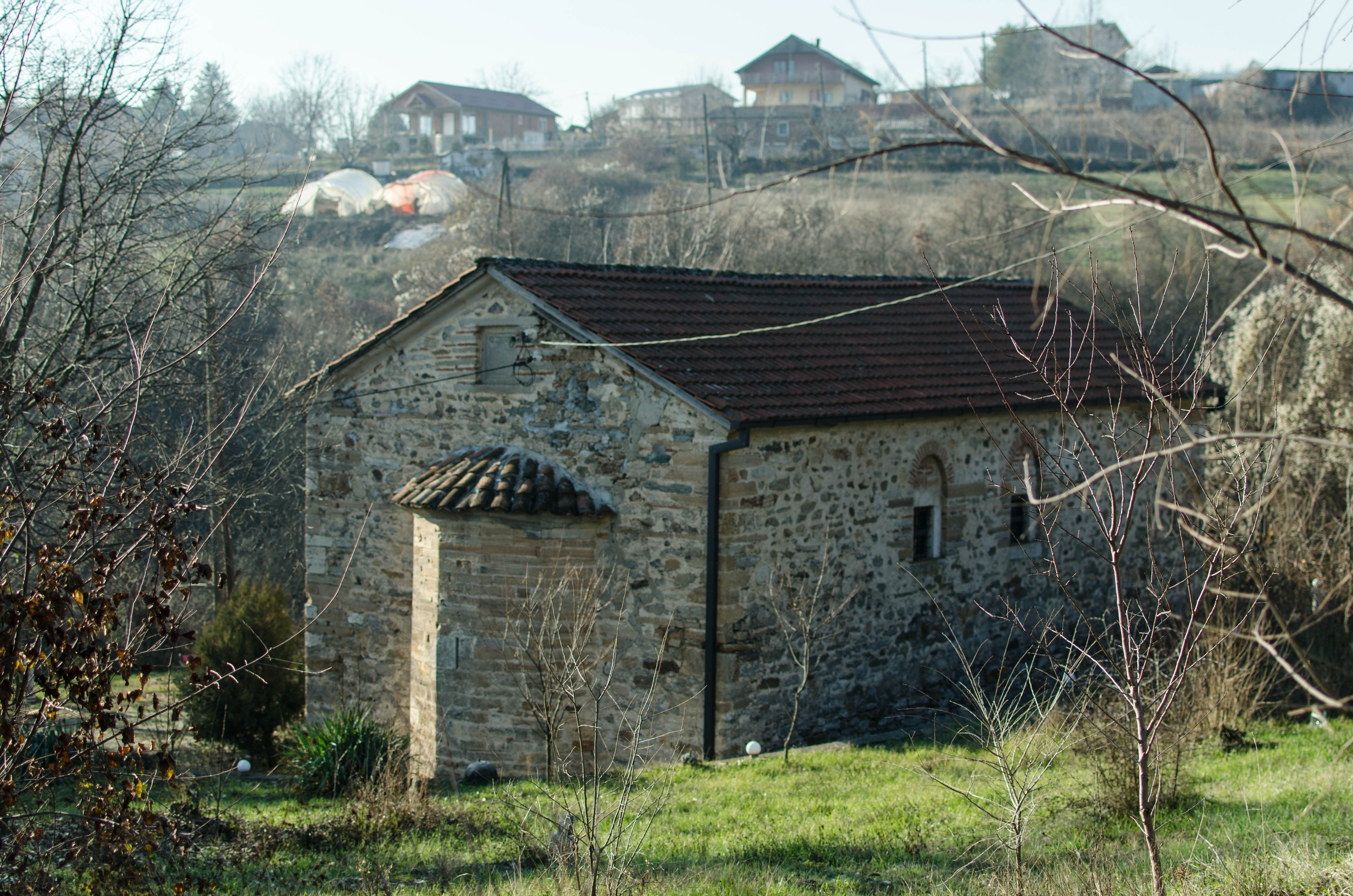
- Church in Creševo

- Location in Gazi Baba Municipality

- Location within Republic of North Macedonia
- Country: North Macedonia
- Region: Skopje
- Municipality: Gazi Baba

Population (2021)
  - Total: 982
- Time zone: UTC+1 (CET)
  - Summer (DST): UTC+2 (CEST)
- Car plates: SK
- Website: .

Creševo or Creshevo (Macedonian: Црешево) is a village in Gazi Baba Municipality of North Macedonia.

Creševo is located in the northeast of Skopje, 15 km from the center of Skopje, capital city of Republic of North Macedonia.

== Geography and location ==
It is located at the foothills of Skopska Crna Gora. In the east of Creševo is the village of Stračinci, in the northeast there is the village of Viniče, and Bulačani is located in the northwest, Smilkovci is in the southwest and Stajkovci is located in the south of the village of Creševo.

== History ==
Creševo is an old village located at the foot of Mount Skopska Crna Gora. The date of the origin of the village is not known, but It is thought that even during the Roman Empire there was a settlement which was located 3 km from the village named as Elenovo.

The earliest documented trace is found in literature about King Stefan Milutin as early as, 1300 and published 1905 in Српски Етнографски Зборник.

Села: Глуво, Побужје, Бањани и данашње селиште Лопушани помињу се у хрисовуљи Краља Милутина од 1317. године; а село Кучевиште са засеоком Бродцем и данашње селиште Сливовићи помињу се у хрисовуљи цара Душана од 1348. године. Погранично црногорско село Црешево помиње се у поменутој повељи Констан тина Техова и Краља Милутина од 1300. године. У овој се хрисовуљи помиње још много места, извора, заселака у Црној Гори“.

There are documents which mention Creševo in the Ottoman Empire in the documents of Mustafa Pasha who was rewarded for his loyalty to the Sultan Bayezid II.

According to the 1467-68 Ottoman defter, Creševo (Çarrashevo) exhibits a mixed Orthodox Christian Slavic-Albanian anthroponomy. Some families had a mixed Slav-Albanian names, usually a Slavic first name and an Albanian last name or last names with Albanian patronyms and Slavic suffixes.

The names are: Ber-ko son of Ugrin, Stepan son of Cakravel, Pejo son of Lesh-iç, Niko son of Koja, Niko son of Lesha, David, poor (siromah), Dral his son, Dila, poor (siromah), Dimitri his son, Tom-ka the son of Marin, Nikola his brother, Rada the son of Ugrin, Boja the son of Kola, Nikola the son of Niko, Niko the son of Peshko, Koja his son, Kostadini the son of Berisal, Rajçin the son of Berisal, Petko Peshka, Koja, his son, Boja and his son Martin, Rapçin and his son Berisal, Kostadin and his son Berisal.

Mustafa Pasha was vizier of Sultan Bayezid II (1481-1512) and Selim I (1512-1520) and held various public offices in the Ottoman Empire. He owned a large estate in Rumelia and four villages near Skopje: Bulačani, Batinci, Raštak and Creševo. He was the son of Abdullah (Abdulkerim), he had two wives, both named Khurshid and four daughters Hani Umi Shah Zeman and Huma.

Significant archaeological sites in the area of Creševo are: Breaks Dool found necropolis from Roman times. Selishte, isolated finding from Roman times. Smilkovci a settlement from Roman times.

== Demography ==
According to the last census of the population of Macedonia since 2021, the village has 982 inhabitants. Below is a table on the national structure of the population

Year	Macedonian	Albanian	Turks	Romani	Vlachs	Serbs	Bosniaks	Others	Persons for whom data are taken from admin. sources	Total
2002	1.263	...	...	...	1	12	...	2	n/a	1.278
2021	911	...	...	...	...	8	...	1	62	982

== Social institutions ==
In the village of Creševo there is a middle school satellite school "Naum Ohridski", while the center is in the village of Bulačani.

== Christian Orthodox Churches ==
There are three churches in the village of Creševo, one of which was an old monastery.

- Church "St. Spas "
- Church "St. John "- Creševo One of the oldest in the area dating back 11th AD based on the inscription on tombstones.
- Church "St. Petka "- Creševo - monastery church

== Culture and sports ==
Every year the cultural manifestation "Revue of folk costumes, instruments and songs of Creševo" is held, where numerous cultural artists, as well as costumes from different parts of our country, are represented.
