= Gotse Delchev (disambiguation) =

Gotse Delchev was a Macedonian Bulgarian revolutionary and leader of the Internal Macedonian Revolutionary Organization.

Gotse Delchev or Goce Delčev may also refer to:

- Gotse Delchev (town), a town in southwestern Bulgaria
  - Gotse Delchev Municipality, Bulgaria
- Goce Delčev, Gazi Baba, a village in North Macedonia
- Gotse Delchev Brigade, a military unit during WWII
- Goce Delčev Square, a town square in Strumica, North Macedonia
