= Viktor Karamarkov =

Macedonian serial killer (born 1981)

- Mugshot picture
- Born: 1981 (age 44–45); Skopje, Socialist Republic of Macedonia, SFR Yugoslavia
- Other names: "The Macedonian Raskolnikov" "The Skopje serial killer"
- Convictions: Murder x4 Attempted murder x2
- Penalty: Life imprisonment

Details
- Victims: 4
- Span of crimes: March – October 2009
- Country: North Macedonia
- State: Skopje
- Date apprehended: October 27, 2009
- Imprisoned at: Kolonija Idrizovo

Viktor Karamarkov (born 1981), known as The Macedonian Raskolnikov, is a Macedonian serial killer who murdered four elderly women in the nation's capital from March to October 2009. Additionally responsible for numerous thefts and three attempted murders, he was sentenced to life imprisonment, and is currently incarcerated in Kolonija Idrizovo.

== Early life ==
Born in the Gjorče Petrov neighbourhood, Karamarkov grew up with his mentally unstable mother, as his father had died when he was young. Although described as a loner, Karamarkov was regarded as a highly intelligent boy who finished his primary education with an excellent grade, and was very respectful of the elderly. He was also heavily indulged in various Russian literature, especially Fyodor Dostoevsky's Crime and Punishment, identifying himself with the novel's main character, impoverished ex-student Rodion Raskolnikov. However, Karamarkov was also a known delinquent and drug addict, who frequently engaged in various thefts.

== Murders ==
Taking inspiration from his favourite book, Karamarkov would search for vulnerable, older ladies to commit his murders. When he found a suitable victim, he would ring the doorbell and ask them for money, on the pretence that it was for his ailing mother. After entering the apartment, Karamarkov would take out a small axe wrapped in a newspaper and tape and kill the unsuspecting victim. After killing the victim he would steal any gold jewelry found in the apartment in order to supply his drug habit. After each killing, he would visit the "St. Peter and Paul" Church in Gjorče Petrov, and ask for forgiveness.

=== Victims ===
- Ljubica Hristovska (83) – Killed at her home in Butel, from a sustained head injury. When first investigated, police suspected that the killer was either from the family or the neighbourhood due to the fact there were no signs of a struggle, nothing appeared to have been disturbed and the door had been locked from the inside.
- Bosilka Krasojevič (71) – Killed on 15 October. She was attacked in her home on "October Revolution" Street, and later died from her injuries. Authorities noted that this killing was very similar to Hristovska's murder.
- Vera Bogoevska (76) – Killed on the same day as Krasojevič. She was attacked in her home on "Franco Cluz" Street, and later died from her injuries.
- Elena Mileva (69) – Killed on 26 October, in her home on "Ho Chi Minh" Street. Karamarkov was arrested for theft shortly after her murder.

=== Attempted murders ===
- Marija Atanasovska (79) – A resident of Kapishtec, Atanasovska was assaulted by Karamarkov in an elevator, sustaining head injuries. While Atanasovska lay bleeding to death, he attempted to leave the scene but was surprised by the victim's son-in-law, who was waiting for her at the exit. The son-in-law, confused after seeing blood in the elevator, asked Karamarkov as he was exiting what happened to the victim. Karamarkov explained that she had injured herself, and helped the son-in-law get her out of the elevator, before promptly fleeing the scene.
- Smilja Petrovska (73) – Attacked on 21 October. She was able to fight off her attacker near her "Railway Street" home.
- Sanie Sulejmani (42) – Sulejmani, a hygienist, was attacked on the same day as Petrovska. Sulejmani managed to fight off Karamarkov at her home in Mavrovka Shopping Centre.

== Investigation, capture and sentence ==
Although initially they didn't suspect there was a serial killer on the prowl, authorities gradually connected the dots due to the crime similarities: elderly women, killed in their apartments with a blunt object to the back of the head. It was also noticed that all the victims had gold jewellery missing. They contacted the surviving victims' statements, who described their attacker as a young man, who went door to door with a health book in his hands, seeking financial help for his mother. However, they couldn't describe him in great detail, as he appeared average and very unassuming. On 27 October, Karamarkov was captured and given an 8-month sentence for theft, but witnesses and relatives of the attacked women identified him as the attacker. While searching his home, authorities located the axe used in the murders.

Shortly after his picture was shown on national television, many women came to identify him as the man who had stolen their jewellery. One woman, identified only as K. M., said that ten days before his arrest, he forcibly pulled off her gold chain while she was walking near the Ministry of Culture. Distressed, the young woman chased after the perpetrator, but he managed to slip away. Shocked, Karamarkov's mother refused to believe that her son was a cold-blooded killer.

Although he didn't confess to the killings, Karamarkov mentioned details that only the perpetrator would know. During his final statement to the court, Karamarkov claimed that he had been drugged while making his statements, and that he had been taken for three days at an unknown location. While there, a picture of Josip Broz Tito was hung on the wall, and he had not been provided a lawyer. Despite this, he was sentenced to life imprisonment, much to the dismay of his lawyer Sasho Dukovski, who claimed that there was no sufficient evidence for the verdict.

== See also ==
- List of serial killers by country
