= Mirkovci =

Mirkovci may refer to:

- Mirkovci, Croatia, a village in the city of Vinkovci
- Mirkovci, North Macedonia, a village in the municipality of Čučer-Sandevo, city of Skopje
- Mirkovci, Serbia, a village in the municipality of Pirot
