= Milan Ciganović =

Serbian revolutionary

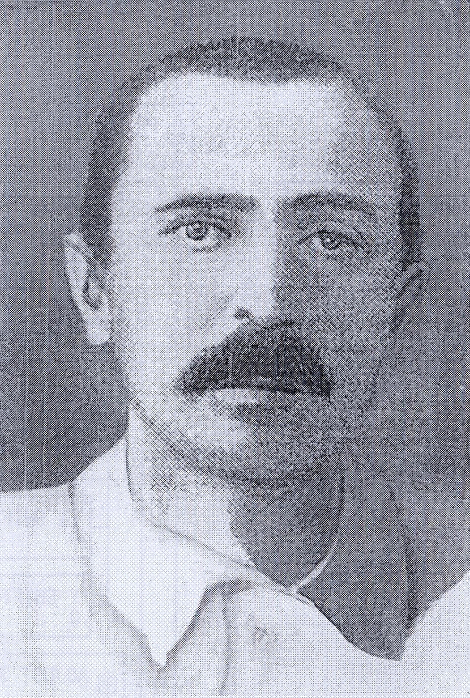
- Ciganović in 1914
- Born: 1888; Bosanski Petrovac, Bosnia and Herzegovina, Austria-Hungary
- Died: 1 September 1927 (aged 38–39); Trubarevo, Kingdom of Serbs, Croats and Slovenes

Milan Ciganović (Serbian Cyrillic: Милан Цигановић; 1888 – 1 September 1927) was a Serbian revolutionary and one of the main organizers of the assassination of Archduke Franz Ferdinand in 1914.

Born in Bosanski Petrovac, Ciganović later moved to Belgrade where he joined the Black Hand. Ciganović played an important role in the assassination of the Austrian Archduke Franz Ferdinand because he delivered four revolvers, six bombs and a bottle of poison to Nedeljko Čabrinović, Gavrilo Princip and Trifko Grabež. Following the assassination, the Serbian government sent Ciganović to the United States for his safety during World War I. He returned home in 1919 and received a land award from the government, married and settled down as a farmer.

He died on 1 September 1927 in Trubarevo.
