= Strumičanka pod maska =

Statue in North Macedonia

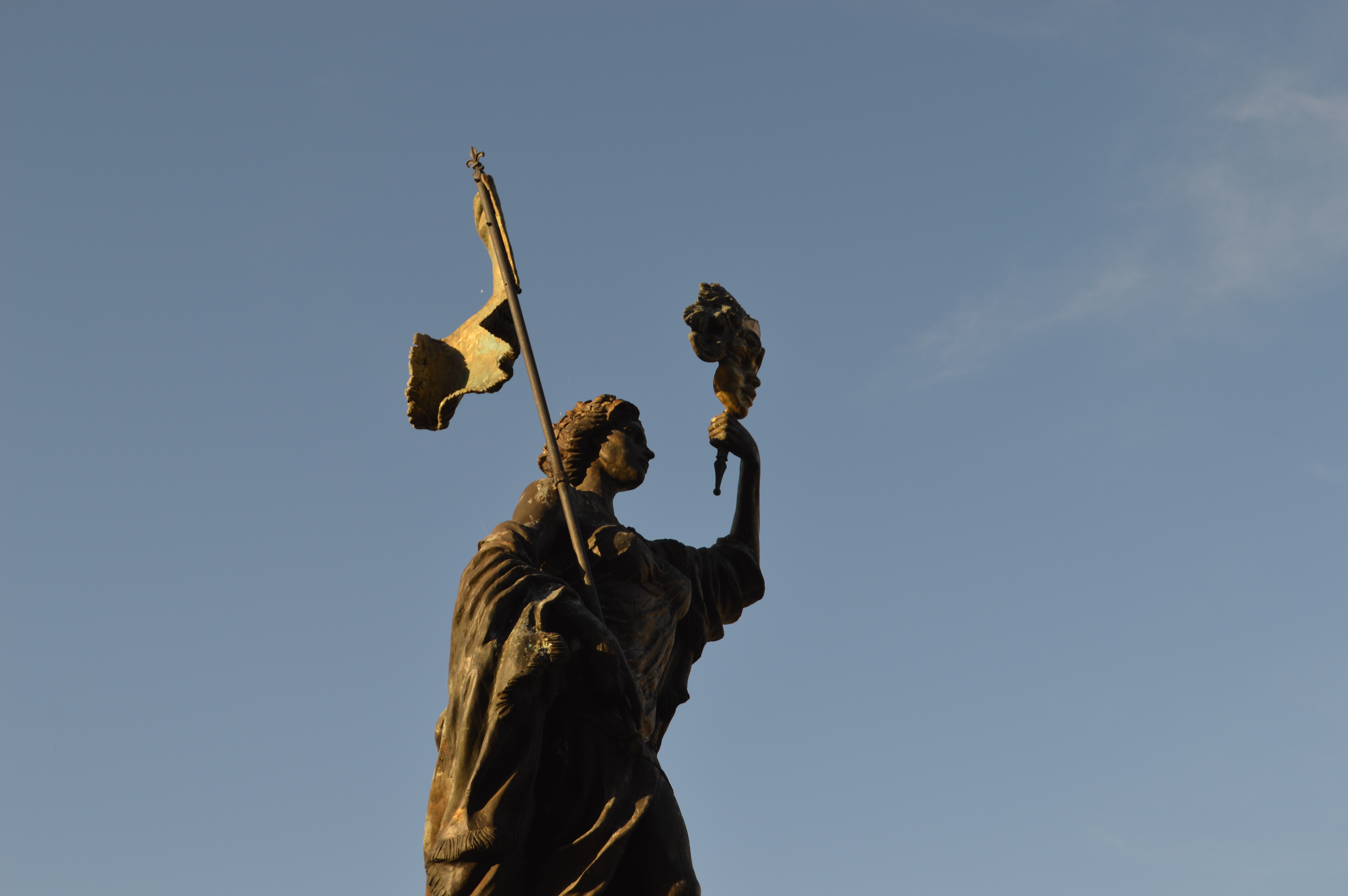
The statue before sunset, 2017

Strumičanka pod maska (Macedonian: Струмичанка под маска, translated as Strumica woman under mask) is a bronze statue located at the Goce Delčev city square in Strumica, North Macedonia that represents the carnival tradition as an important element in the cultural identity of the city and its population. The monument was built as part of the city square's reconstruction, which was finished in December 2010. The designer of the monument is the Macedonian sculptor Nataša Božarova Pijanmanova. The bronze figure, which is made in natural size of a human body, in one hand holds a carnival mask, and in the other the flag of Strumica.
