= Strumica =

Strumica Струмица (Macedonian)
- Town
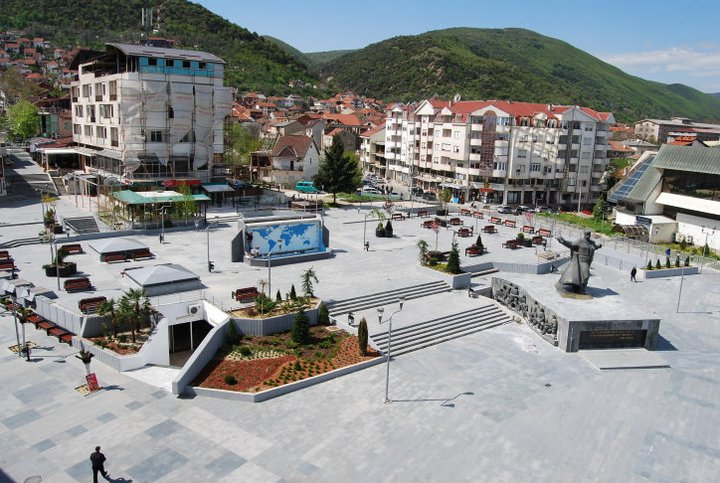
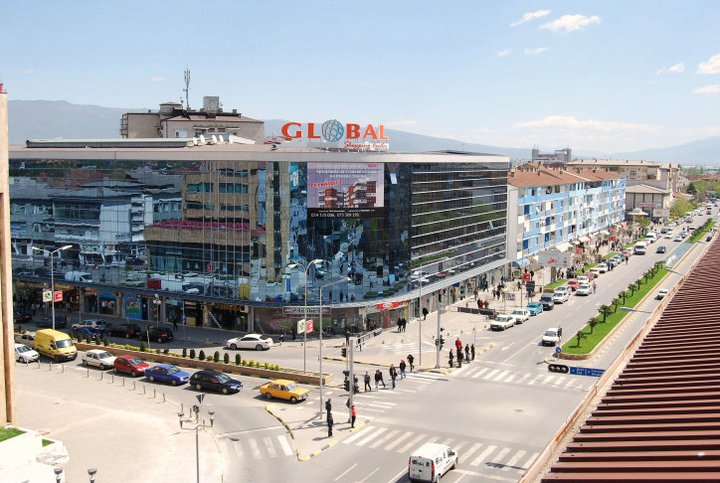
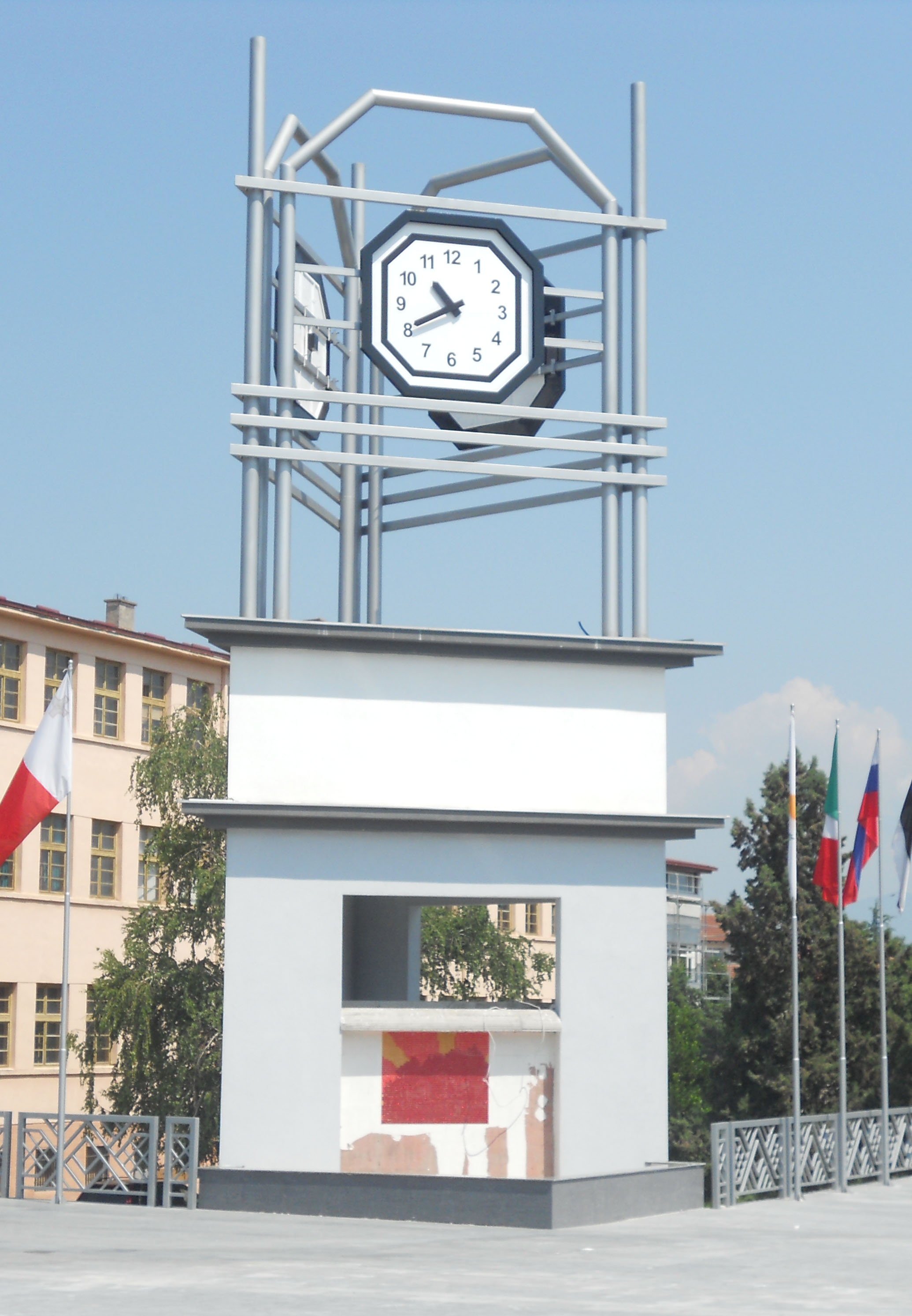
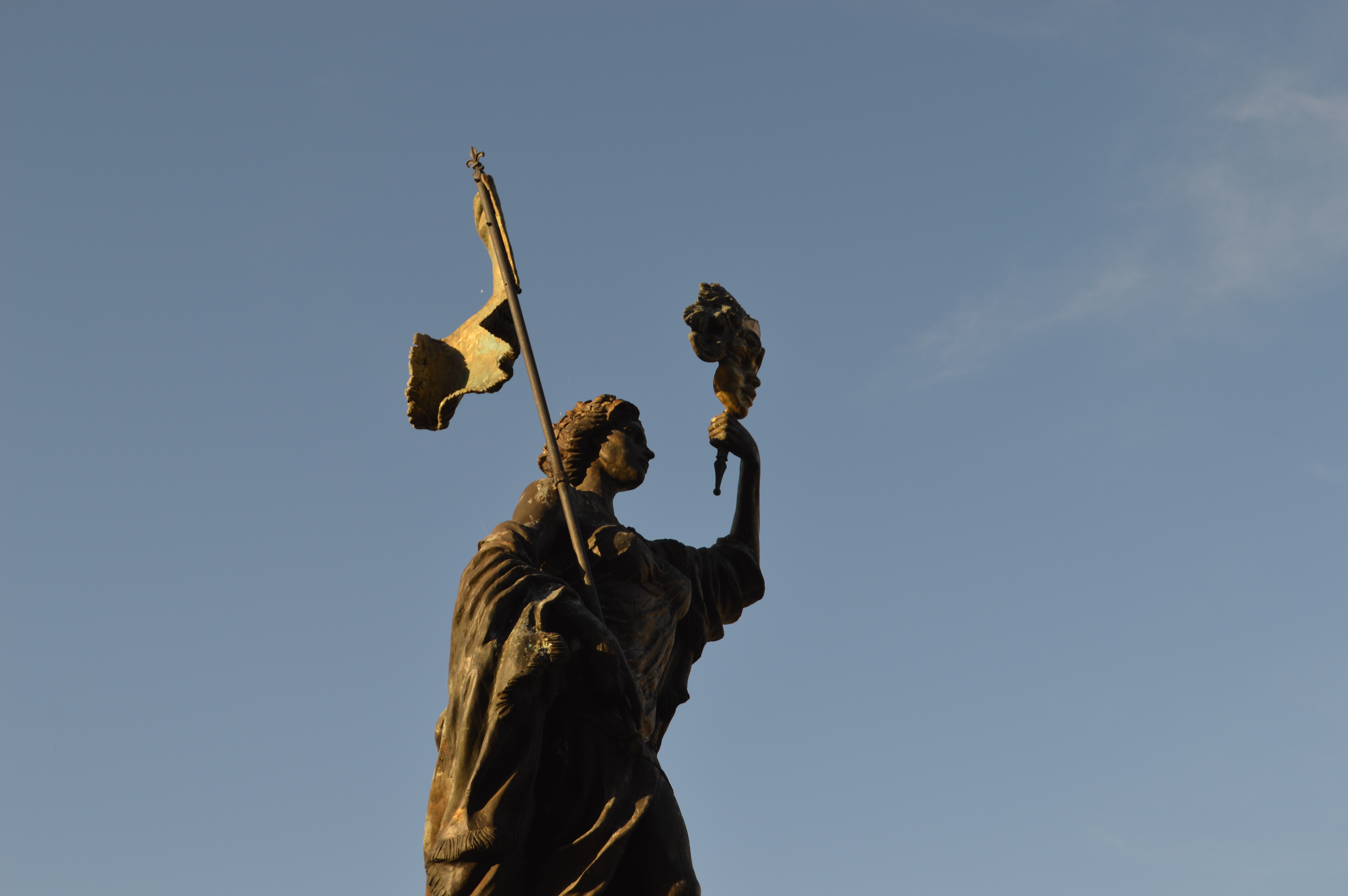
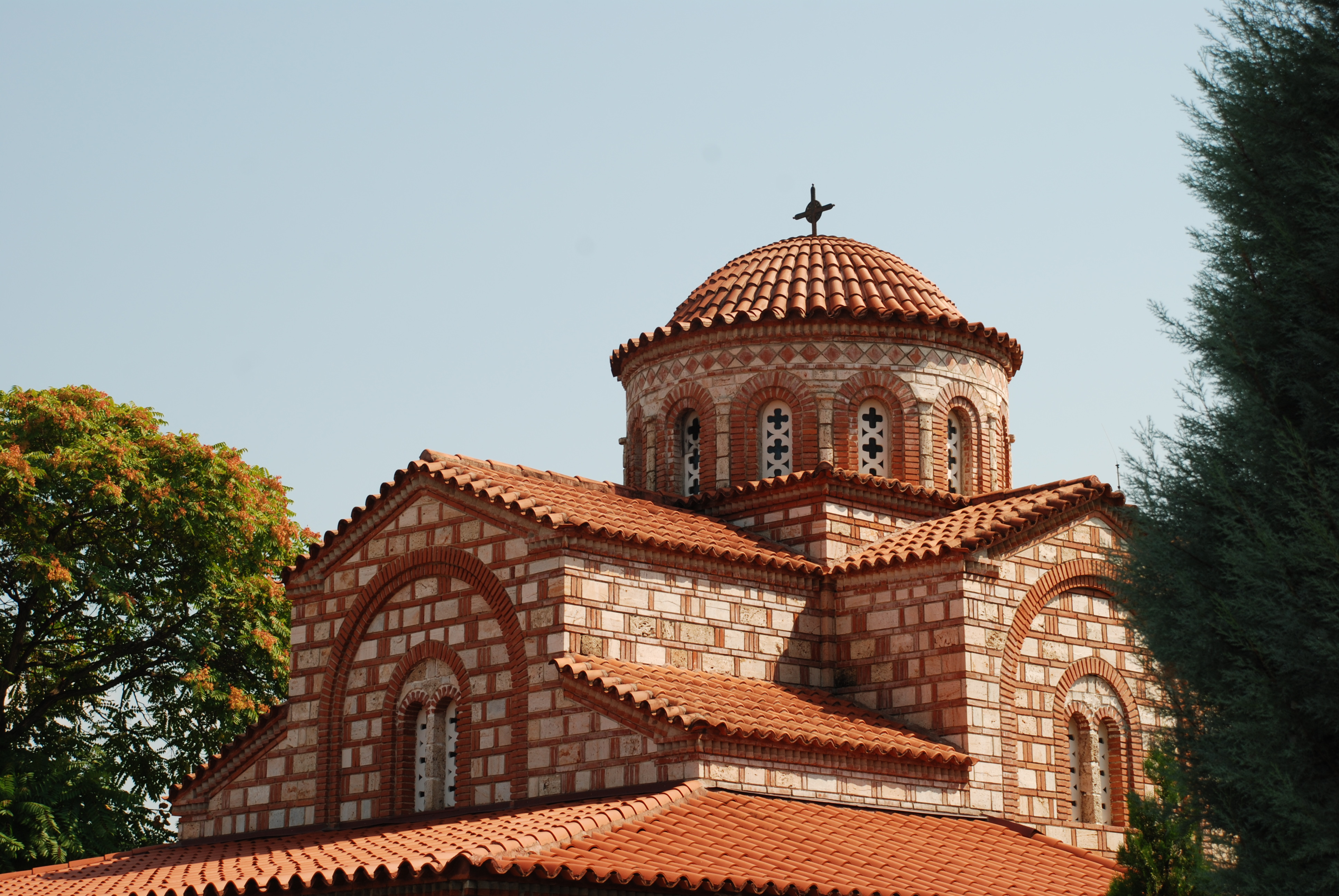
- From the top, Goce Delčev Square, Global Mall, Clock Tower, Woman behind mask statue, St. Demetrius and St. Gregory Palamas church

- Flag Coat of arms

- Location within North Macedonia
- Coordinates: 41°26′20″N 22°38′20″E
- Country: North Macedonia
- Region: Southeastern
- Municipality: Strumica

Government
  - Mayor: Petar Jankov (VMRO-DPMNE)
- Elevation: 230 m (750 ft)

Population (2021)
  - Town: 33,825
  - Metro: 49,995
- Time zone: UTC+1 (CET)
  - Summer (DST): UTC+2 (CEST)
- Postal code: 2400
- Area code: +389 34
- Vehicle registration: SR
- Patron saints: Holy Fifteen Hieromartyrs of Tiberiopolis
- Climate: Cfa
- Website: www.strumica.gov.mk

Strumica (Macedonian: Струмица, pronounced [ˈstrumit͡sa]) is the largest city in southeastern North Macedonia and the country's ninth most populous overall, situated near the Novo Selo-Petrich border crossing with Bulgaria. About 54,676 people live in the city and its surrounding region. The city, which is the eponymous seat of the Strumica Municipality, is named after the Strumica River, a tributary of the Struma which runs through it.

== Name ==
The town is first mentioned in the 2nd century BC under the Greek name Αστραίον (Astraîon, "starry") by Ptolemy and Pliny. It was known as Tiberiopolis (Greek: Τιβεριούπολις) in Roman times, and received its present name from the Slavic tribe Strymonites during the Middle Ages. It derives from the name of the Strumica (river) which flows through it. The river's name comes from Thracian Strymón, derived from Proto-Indo-European *srew- 'stream'. In Turkish the town is known as Ustrumca, and in modern Greek Στρώμνιτσα (Strómnitsa). In Bulgarian and Macedonian, the name is Струмица.

== History ==
=== Ancient period ===
According to archaeological findings, settlement of the area dates back to between 6000 and 5000 BC; near the village of Angelci there is a Neolithic settlement called Stranata, while traces of prehistoric culture dating from the beginning of the 4th to the middle of the 3rd millennium BC have been discovered at the site of Carevi Kuli (Tsar's Towers), on the hill above the city. The area was later inhabited by Paionians.

The first mention of the city under the name Astraion is in the writings of the Roman historian Titus Livius in 182 BC regarding the execution of Demetrius, brother of the ancient Macedonian king Perseus (179–168 BC), son of Philip V of Macedon (221–179 BC). The name Astraion came from the Paionian tribe called Astrai. In 148 BC the region became a Roman province. In the Roman period the city had its name changed to Tiberiopolis (Greek: Τιβεριούπολις) which is evidenced by a marble statue base dedicated to the patron Tiberius Claudius Menon, who lived between the late 2nd and early 3rd century AD. During the reign of the Roman emperor Julian the Apostate (361–363 AD), the fifteen holy hieromartyrs of Tiberiopolis were killed. In 395, the Roman Empire split, and Macedonia fell under the Eastern Roman Empire (the Byzantine Empire). After that, Tiberiopolis became part of the province Macedonia Salutaris or Macedonia Secunda in the late 4th century. The urban mansion of Machuk dating from the late ancient period today stands witness for the existence of a city settlement from that time.

=== Middle Ages ===
In the 6th and 7th centuries, the Roman town became a spot for Slavic migration. The Strymonites, a Sclavene tribe, adopted their name from the Strymon (Struma) river. The Strymonites independently ruled until the 9th century, followed by a Byzantine reconquest. Later on, the Strumica region was conquered by Bulgarian Khan Presian (836–852). The Strumica region remained part of the Bulgarian state throughout a period of more than 150 years right up until 1014, when it was retaken by the Byzantines. In the 11th century, written sources begin to refer to the town under its Slavic name Strumica.

In 1016, Byzantine commander David Arianites captured the city from the Bulgarians.

By the end of the 12th century, Byzantium's central power had weakened and, as a result, many local lords broke away and became independent. Initially, the leader of the Vlachs and Bulgarians in eastern Macedonia Dobromir Chrysos (1185–1202) and later the Bulgarian sebastokrator and a member of the Asen dynasty in Veliko Tarnovo - Strez (1208–1214) held the region, which became part of the Bulgarian kingdom in 1202. In the second half of the 13th century the city was retaken by the Byzantine Empire until the Serbian Kingdom conquered the region in the 14th century. Serbian magnate Hrelja ruled Strumica and the nearby region until 1334, when it was put under the direct rule of Serbian King Stefan Dušan who continued his conquest to the south. During the Fall of the Serbian Empire, the Strumica region was first ruled by Uglješa, the brother of magnate Vukašin. Strumica itself was then governed by Dabiživ Spandulj, who served the Dejanović brothers. The Ottoman Empire finally conquered Strumica in 1383.

=== Ottoman period ===
Under Ottoman administration, the town was renamed into Ustrumca. It initially belonged to the Sanjak of Kyustendil before the establishment of the timarli-sipahi system. Nomads and livestock breeders of Turkic origin settled in the area, which altered the general look of the city making it more oriental. According to the 1519 Ottoman census, Strumica had a population of 2,780 people, of which 1,450 were Christians and 1,330 were Muslims. These were times when conversion to Islam was at its peak in the region, which accounts for the increased number of Muslims (2,200) compared to Christians (1,230) according to the census of 1570.

In the 17th century, it became seat of a kadiluk. At about this time, Strumica was visited by the Ottoman travel writers Haji Kalfa (1665) and Evliya Çelebi (1670), who gave a description of the city and all its Islamic buildings. In the late 18th and early 19th century, Strumica was part of the Sanjak of Salonica. During the 19th century the influence of the Patriarchate of Constantinople increased, and so did the number of pro-Greek citizens. Countering this, the Bulgarian Exarchate found support in the Slavic populace; the first Bulgarian school in the Strumica region was opened in Robovo in 1860, and its first teacher was Arseni Kostencev from Štip. This period coincided with the work of the great fresco masters from Strumica – Vasil Gjorgiev and Grigorij Petsanov. They did work in many churches built in the Strumica region at the time. In the late 19th and early 20th century, Strumica was part of the Salonica Vilayet.

=== Late-19th century ===
Following the Berlin Congress of 1878, when the Ottoman Empire lost a sizable portion of its territory on the Balkans, a stream of refugees flowed into the area; some of them ending up in Strumica. These people were called "muhajirs". According to the Ottoman General Census of 1881/82-1893, the kaza of Strumica had a total population of 33.024, consisting of 15.760 Muslims, 13.726 Greeks, 2.965 Bulgarians and 573 Jews.

The Internal Macedonian Revolutionary Organization division for the Ogražden county was formed and operated in these parts. One of the most prominent leaders of the organization in Strumica was Hristo Chernopeev, who took part in the Young Turk Revolution (1908–09). The outcome of this effort did not bring freedom to the local people who still remained under Ottoman rule.

=== 20th century ===
The Kaza of Strumica in 1905 had a total Christian population of 22.860, consisting of 12.736 Exarchist Bulgarians, 8.992 Patriarchist Bulgarians, 624 Protestant Bulgarians, 444 Roma people, 25 Greeks and 6 Vlachs according to the Bulgarian Exarchate secretary Dimitri Mishev (D. M. Brancoff).

In the First Balkan War of 1912 the Ottomans were defeated and driven out of Macedonia (region) by the joint effort of the Balkan League (Serbia, Bulgaria, Greece and Montenegro). Strumica was handed over to Bulgaria following the League's victory. In the Second Balkan War (1913), which was fought between the three of the Balkan allies against Bulgaria, the latter was defeated, but as per the Treaty of Bucharest (28 July 1913), Strumica remained under Bulgarian rule. The Greek army stationed in Strumica disapproved of the decision for withdrawal and set the town on fire. It burned from the 8th to 15 August 1913, and more than 1900 public buildings, private houses and other constructions were razed to the ground. Strumica was made the center of a homonymous district in Bulgaria (largely corresponding to the present day Blagoevgrad province) and stayed under Bulgarian rule until 1919, when it was ceded to the Kingdom of Serbs, Croats and Slovenes after the Treaty of Neuilly-sur-Seine. From 1929 to 1941, Strumica was part of the Vardar Banovina of the Kingdom of Yugoslavia.

On 6 April 1941, the first day of the Axis invasion of Yugoslavia, Strumica was captured by the German Army and, as Bulgaria was allied with Germany, Strumica was turned over under occupation of the Bulgarian armies on 18 April 1941. From 1941 to 1944, Strumica, as with most of Vardar Macedonia, was annexed by the Kingdom of Bulgaria. On 11 September 1944 the Bulgarian army withdrew from Strumica and on 5 November 1944, the German army also left the town. After the war it became part of the SR of Macedonia, one of the six republics of the Socialist Federal Republic of Yugoslavia. With the referendum on 8 September 1991, amid the breakup of Yugoslavia, the country became independent under the constitutional name Republic of Macedonia.

== Geography ==
Strumica is located in the southeastern part of the country, close to the borders with Greece (15 km) and Bulgaria. It is situated in the geographical region of the Strumica Field, or Strumica–Radoviš-basin, where the field meets the highland elevating the Plavuš (west) and Belasica (south) mountains. The Strumica river flows north of the city to east, to Bulgaria, while several tributaries flowing through the city area.

=== Climate ===
Strumica has a humid subtropical climate (Köppen climate classification: Cfa).

Climate data for Strumica (224m)
Month	Jan	Feb	Mar	Apr	May	Jun	Jul	Aug	Sep	Oct	Nov	Dec	Year
Mean daily maximum °C (°F)	7.4 (45.3)	12.8 (55.0)	16.5 (61.7)	21.1 (70.0)	24.9 (76.8)	30.5 (86.9)	33.6 (92.5)	33.4 (92.1)	28.7 (83.7)	22.0 (71.6)	15.2 (59.4)	9.7 (49.5)	21.3 (70.4)
Daily mean °C (°F)	2.5 (36.5)	6.5 (43.7)	9.7 (49.5)	13.6 (56.5)	17.7 (63.9)	22.7 (72.9)	25.2 (77.4)	25.0 (77.0)	20.5 (68.9)	14.5 (58.1)	9.5 (49.1)	4.8 (40.6)	14.4 (57.8)
Mean daily minimum °C (°F)	−2.3 (27.9)	0.2 (32.4)	2.8 (37.0)	6.1 (43.0)	10.5 (50.9)	14.8 (58.6)	16.9 (62.4)	16.5 (61.7)	12.2 (54.0)	7.0 (44.6)	3.8 (38.8)	0.0 (32.0)	7.4 (45.3)
Average precipitation mm (inches)	33 (1.3)	33 (1.3)	36 (1.4)	37 (1.5)	52 (2.0)	41 (1.6)	33 (1.3)	29 (1.1)	28 (1.1)	39 (1.5)	54 (2.1)	44 (1.7)	459 (17.9)
Source 1: weatheronline.co.uk
Source 2: Climate-Data.org

== Population ==
Population of the city in 2002 consisted of:

- Macedonians: 50,258 / 91.9%
- Turks: 3,754 / 6.8%
- Others: 1.3%

As of 2021, the city of Strumica has 33,825 inhabitants and the ethnic composition was the following:

- Macedonians – 26,185
- Turks – 2,703
- Romani – 216
- Serbs - 91
- Aromanian - 10
- Albanians - 6
- Bosniaks - 3
- others – 247
- Person without Data - 4,364

== International relations ==
Strumica is twinned with:

- Elektrostal, Russia

== Gallery ==
Strumica Town Hall

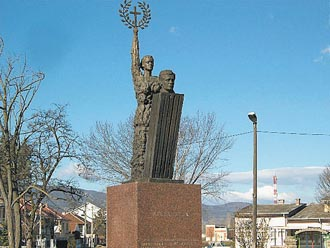
Monument Macedonia dedicated to the president of the Republic of Macedonia, Boris Trajkovski

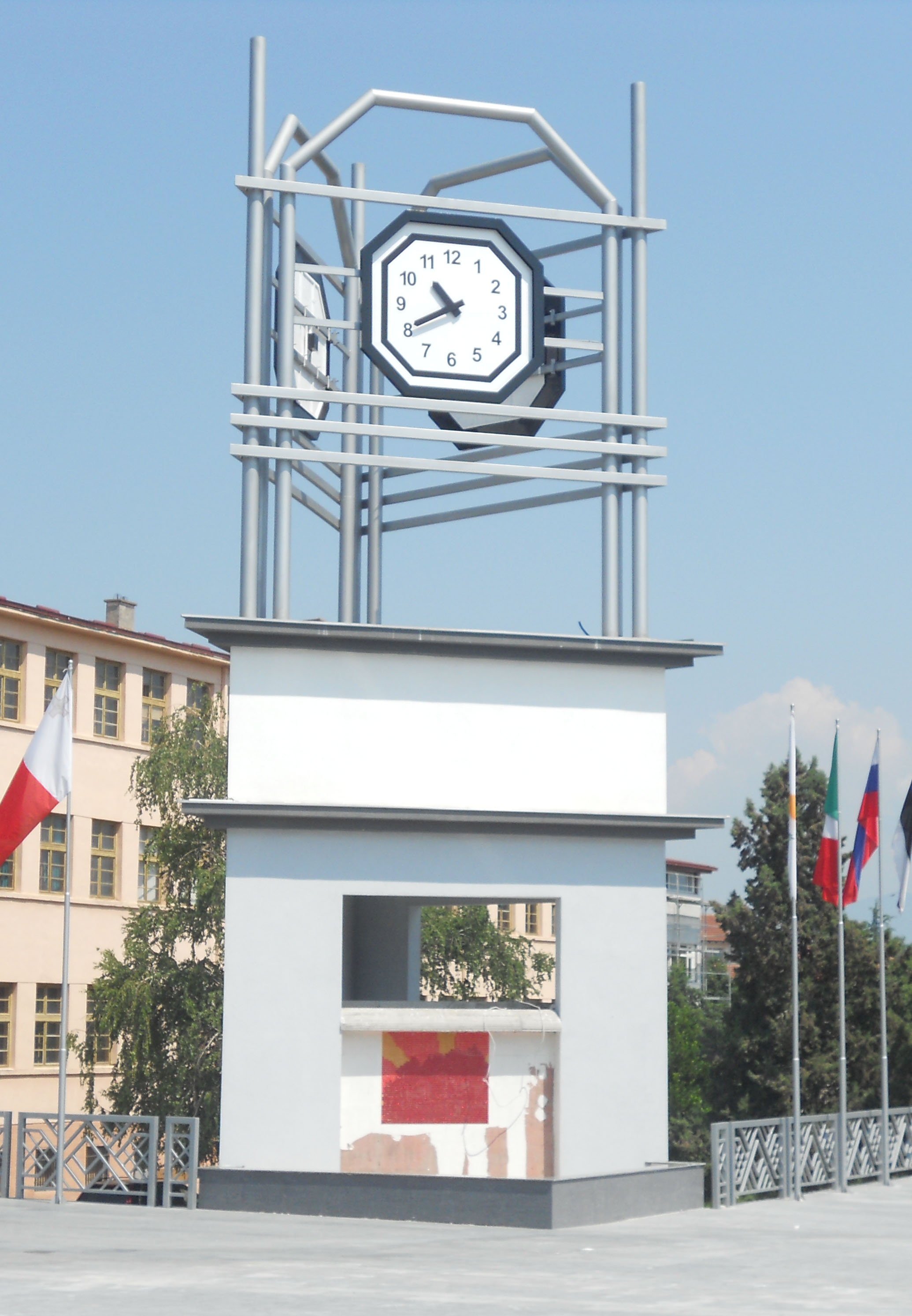
Strumica Clock Tower

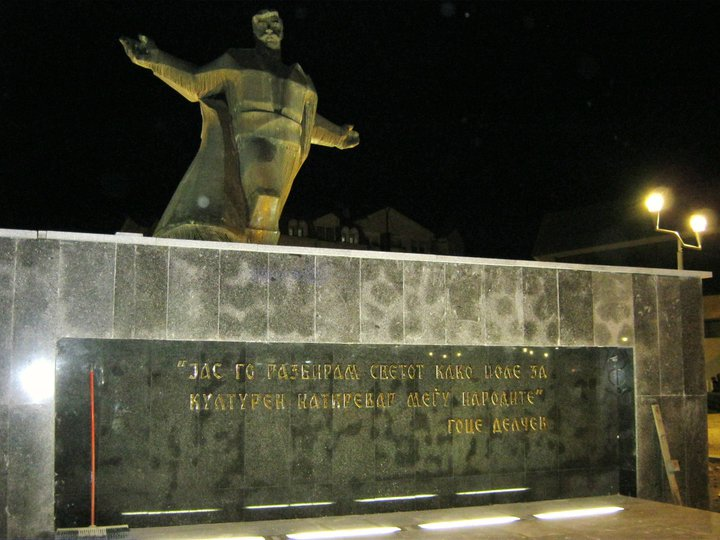
Goce Delčev statue

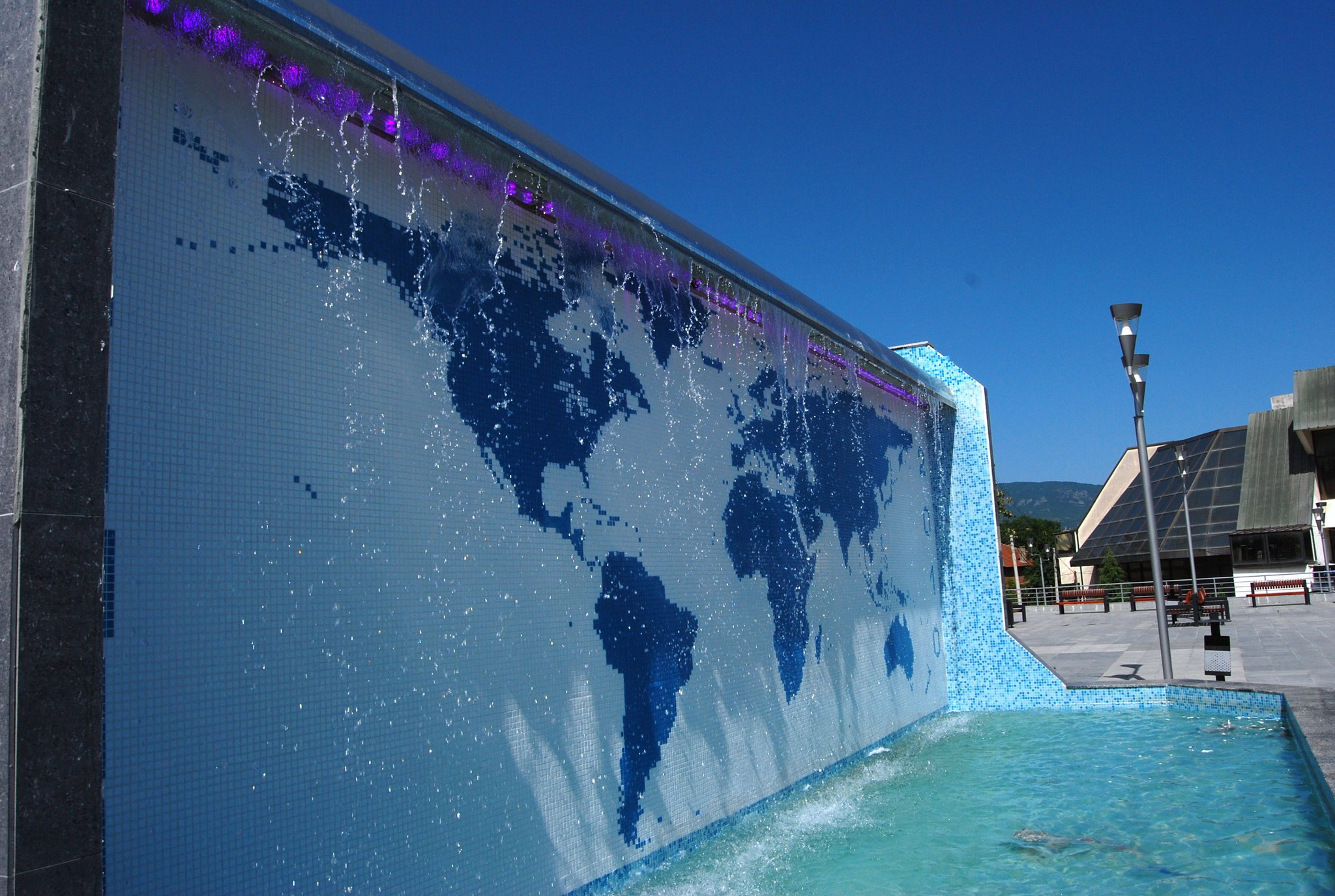
World map fountain at Goce Delčev Square

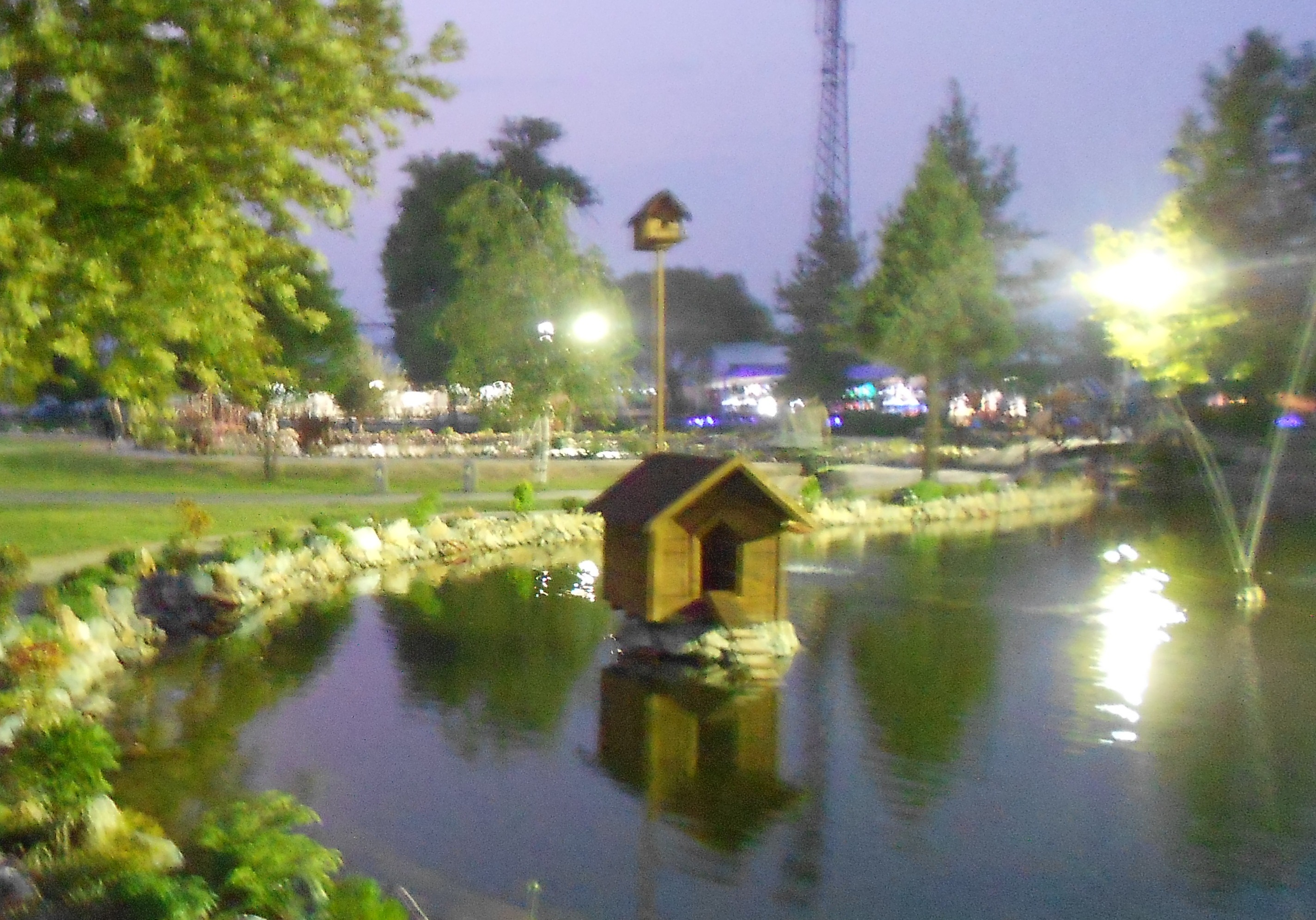
The Strumica Lake

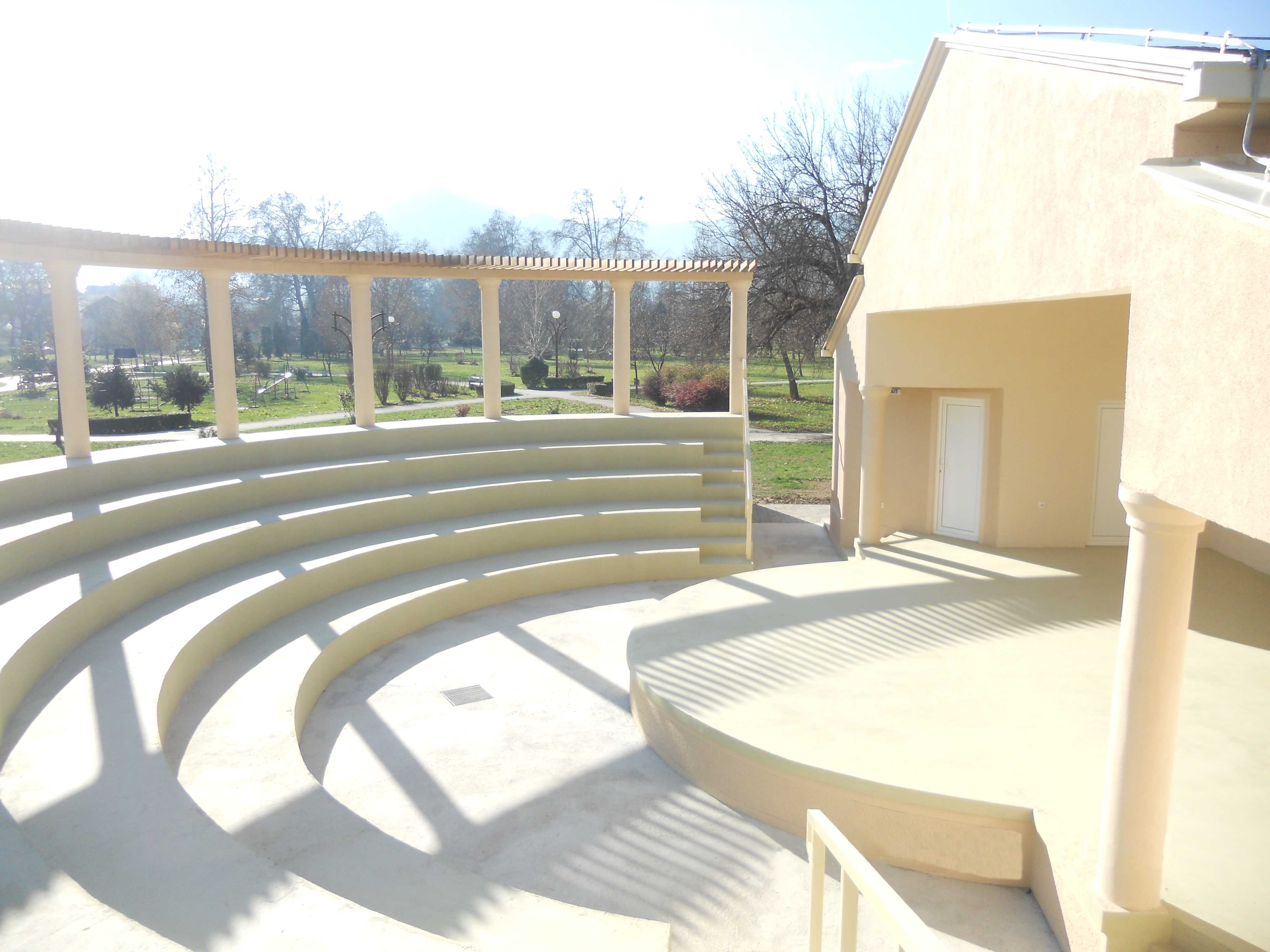
The Strumica Amphitheatre

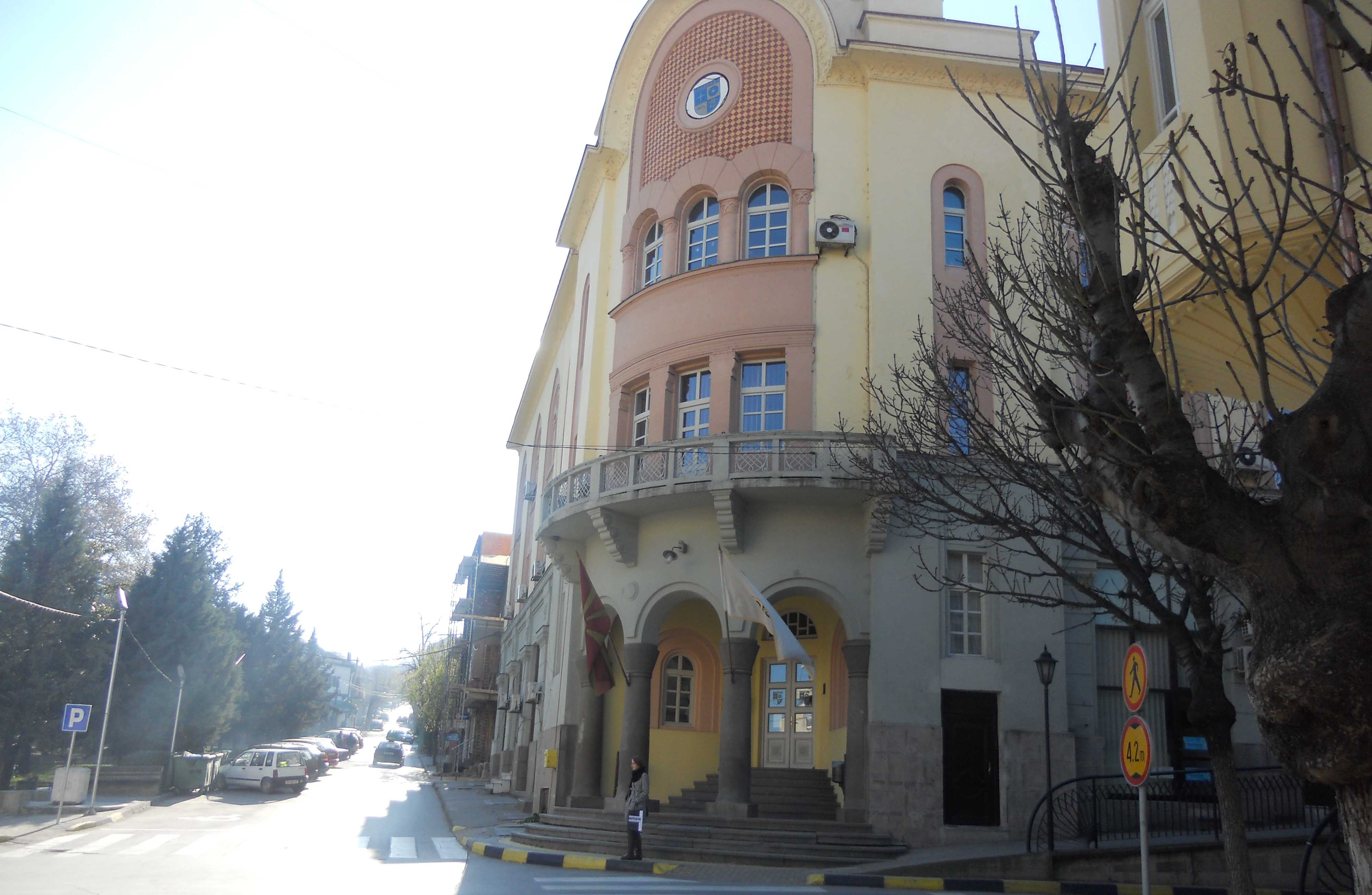
Strumica Town Hall
