= Viniče =

Viniče Виниче
- Village
- Location in Gazi Baba Municipality

- Location within North Macedonia
- Coordinates: 42°3′21″N 21°31′21″E
- Country: North Macedonia
- Region: Skopje
- Municipality: Gazi Baba

Population (2021)
  - Total: 354
- Time zone: UTC+1 (CET)
  - Summer (DST): UTC+2 (CEST)
- Car plates: SK
- Website: .

Viniče (Macedonian: Виниче) is a village in the municipality of Gazi Baba, North Macedonia. Viniče up to 2021 census was included in the village of Creševo

== Demographics ==
According to the 2021 census, the village had a total of 354 inhabitants. Ethnic groups in the village include:

- Macedonians 336
- Serbs 4
- Others 14

Year	Macedonian	Serbs	Others	Total
2002	village of Creševo			
2021	336	4	14	354
