= Brnjarci =

Brnjarci Брнјарци Bërnjarcë
- Village
- Location in Gazi Baba Municipality

- Location within North Macedonia
- Coordinates: 42°2′3″N 21°32′48″E
- Country: North Macedonia
- Region: Skopje
- Municipality: Gazi Baba

Population (2021)
  - Total: 1,254
- Time zone: UTC+1 (CET)
  - Summer (DST): UTC+2 (CEST)
- Car plates: SK
- Website: .

Brnjarci (Macedonian: Брнјарци, Albanian: Bërnjarcë) is a village in the municipality of Gazi Baba, North Macedonia.

== Demographics ==
According to the 2021 census, the village had a total of 1.254 inhabitants. Ethnic groups in the village include:

- Macedonians (main ethnicity)
- Albanians undefined
- Serbs
- Others
