= Jurumleri =

Jurumleri Јурумлери
- Village
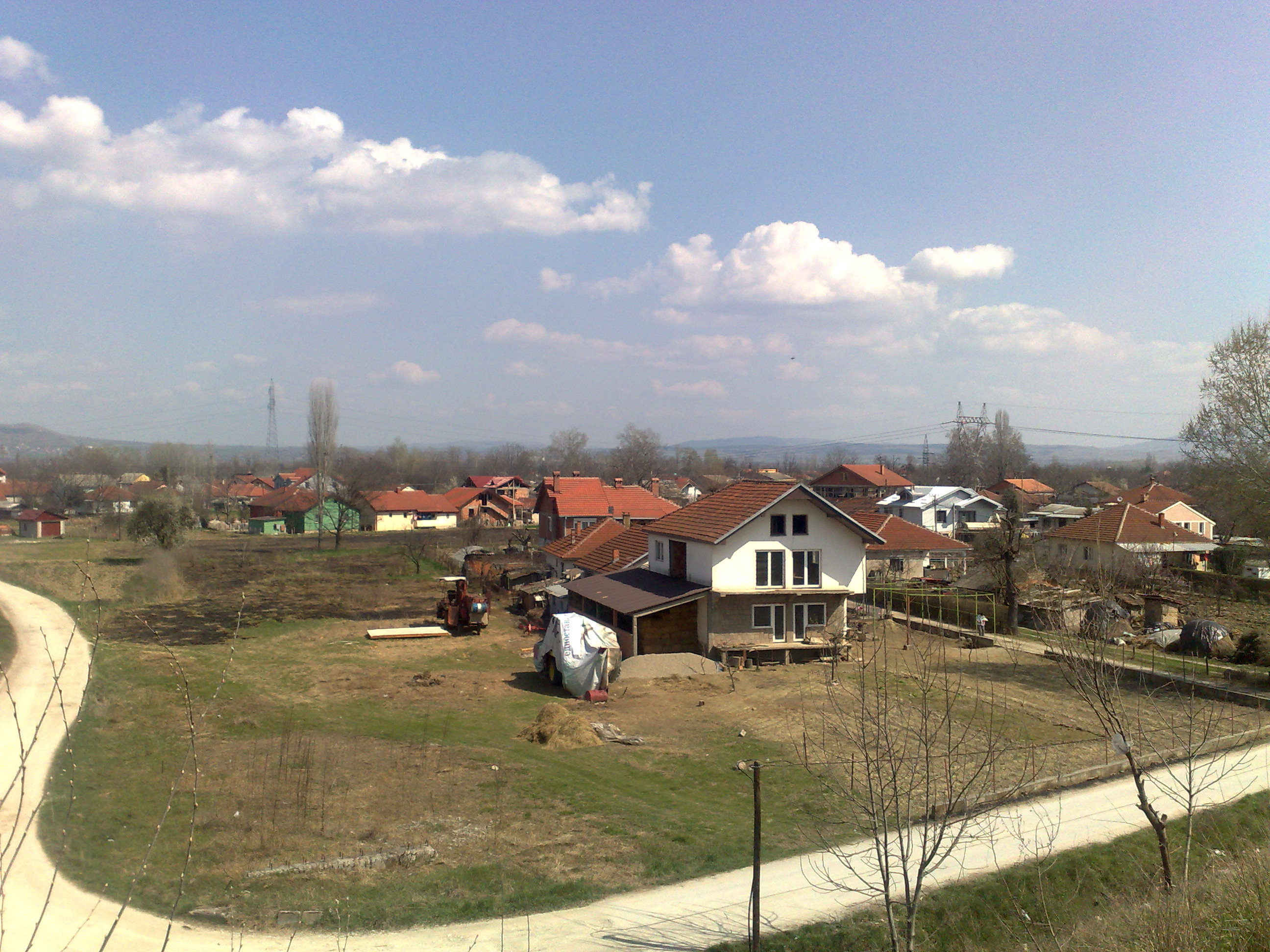

- Location in Gazi Baba Municipality

- Location within North Macedonia
- Coordinates: 41.967662°N 21.556468°E
- Country: North Macedonia
- Region: Skopje
- Municipality: Gazi Baba

Population (2021)
  - Total: 3,256
- Time zone: UTC+1 (CET)
  - Summer (DST): UTC+2 (CEST)
- Website: .

Jurumleri (Macedonian: Јурумлери) is a village in the municipality of Gazi Baba, North Macedonia. It is located 15 km southeast of Skopje.

== Demographics ==
According to the 2021 census, the village had a total of 3.256 inhabitants. Ethnic groups in the village include:

- Macedonians 2,522
- Romani 342
- Persons for whom data are taken from administrative sources 254
- Serbs 62
- Albanians 54
- Vlachs 7
- Others 269

Year	Macedonian	Albanian	Turks	Romani	Vlachs	Serbs	Bosniaks	Others	Persons for whom data are taken from admin. sources	Total
2002	2.523	25	...	331	3	58	...	43	n/a	2.983
2021	2.522	54	...	342	7	62	...	15	254	3.256
