= Kučkovo =

Kučkovo Кучково
- Village
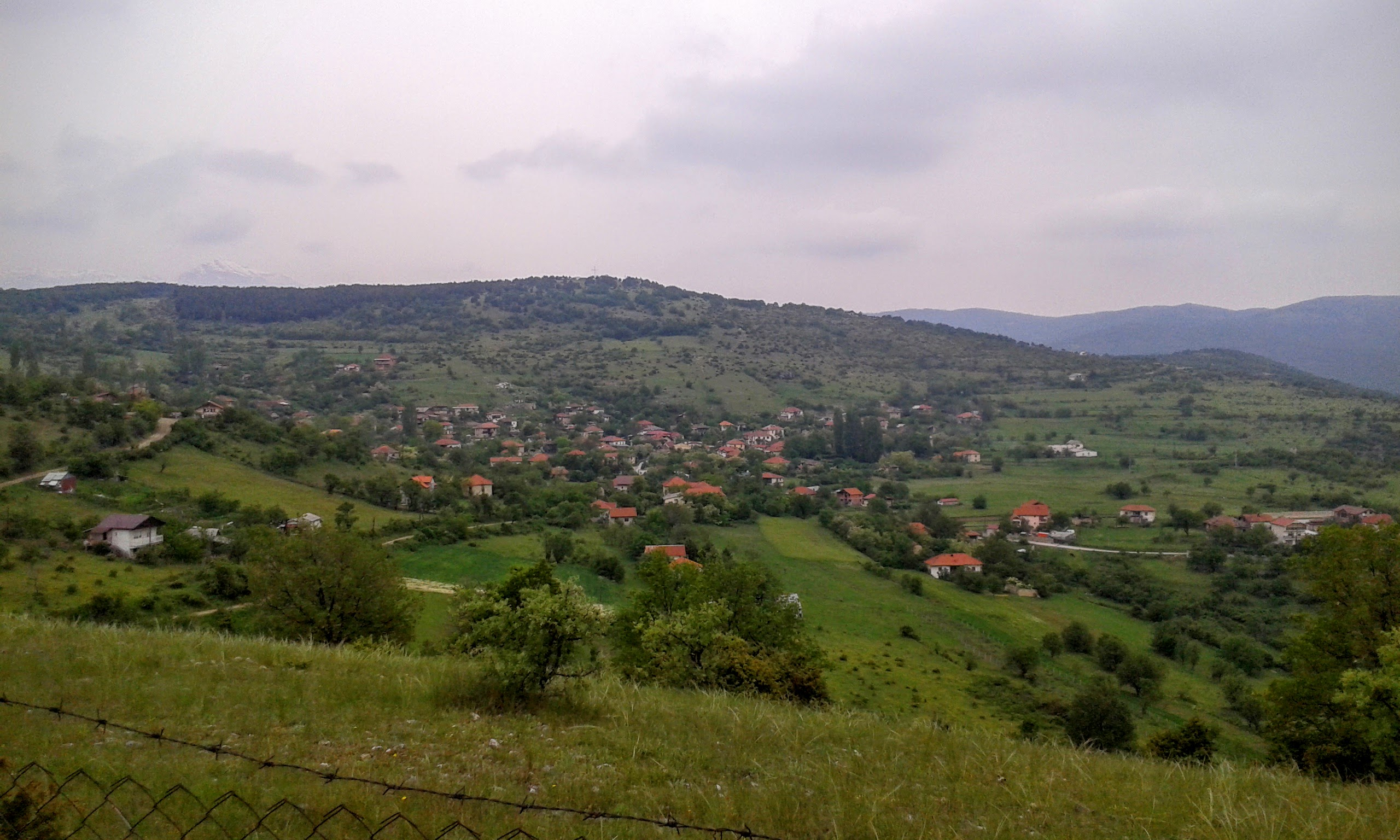

- Location within North Macedonia
- Country: North Macedonia
- Region: Skopje
- Municipality: Ǵorče Petrov

Population (2021)
  - Total: 148
- Time zone: UTC+1 (CET)
  - Summer (DST): UTC+2 (CEST)
- Car plates: SK
- Website: .

Kučkovo (Macedonian: Кучково) is a village in North Macedonia. It is part of the Ǵorče Petrov Municipality.

== Demographics ==
As of the 2021 census, Kučkovo had 148 residents with the following ethnic composition:

- Macedonians 107
- Persons for whom data are taken from administrative sources 29
- Others 12

According to the 2002 census, the village had a total of 138 inhabitants. Ethnic groups in the village include:

- Macedonians 122
- Serbs 1
- Romani 15
