= Gazi Baba, Skopje =

Neighbourhood in Skopje, North Macedonia

Gazi Baba
- Neighbourhood
- Гази Баба
- Location in Gazi Baba Municipality

- Location within Republic of North Macedonia
- Coordinates: 41.996941°N 21.479881°E
- Country: North Macedonia
- Region: Skopje
- Municipality: Gazi Baba

Population (2021)
  - Total: 38,426
- Time zone: UTC+1 (CET)
  - Summer (DST): UTC+2 (CEST)
- Car plates: SK
- Website: .

Gazi Baba (Macedonian: Гази Баба) is a neighbourhood in the City of Skopje, North Macedonia, and the seat of Gazi Baba Municipality.

== Demographics ==
According to the 2021 census, the town had a total of 38.426 inhabitants. Ethnic groups in the town include:

- Macedonians 28.887
- Persons for whom data are taken from administrative sources 3,064
- Albanians 2,755
- Romani 1,099
- Serbs 1,026
- Bosniaks 607
- Others 430
- Turks 413
- Vlachs 145

Year	Macedonian	Albanian	Turks	Romani	Vlachs	Serbs	Bosniaks	Others	Persons for whom data are taken from admin. sources	Total
2002	13,254	523	131	246	67	656	83	222	n/a	15,182
2021	28,887	2.755	413	1,099	145	1,026	607	430	3,064	38,426

Gazi Baba has a mixed population that includes minorities of Romani and Turks, yet the neighborhood is associated with Albanians in North Macedonia.
