= Indžikovo =

Indžikovo Инџиково
- Village
- Location in Gazi Baba Municipality

- Location within Republic of North Macedonia
- Coordinates: 42°00′N 21°31′E
- Country: North Macedonia
- Region: Skopje
- Municipality: Gazi Baba

Population (2021)
  - Total: 4,324
- Time zone: UTC+1 (CET)
  - Summer (DST): UTC+2 (CEST)
- Car plates: SK
- Website: .

Indžikovo (Macedonian: Инџиково,is a village in the municipality of Gazi Baba, North Macedonia.

== Demographics ==
According to the 2021 census, the village had a total of 4.324 inhabitants. Ethnic groups in the village include:

- Macedonians 2.983
- Albanians 527
- Romani 413
- Persons for whom data are taken from administrative sources 287
- Vlachs 32
- Serbs 49
- Bosniaks 13
- Turks 3
- Others 18

Year	Macedonian	Albanian	Turks	Romani	Vlachs	Serbs	Bosniaks	Others	Persons for whom data are taken from admin. sources	Total
2002	2.567	553	2	62	17	62	23	57	n/a	3.343
2021	2.983	527	3	413	32	49	13	18	287	4.324
