= Gazi Baba Municipality =

Municipality of Macedonia

Municipality of Gazi Baba Општина Гази Баба Komuna e Gazi Babës
- City municipality (Urban)
- Flag Coat of arms

- Coordinates: 42°1′N 21°27′E
- Country: North Macedonia
- Region: Skopje
- Municipal seat: Gazi Baba

Government
  - Mayor: Boban Stefkovski (VMRO-DPMNE)

Population
  - Total: 69,626
- Time zone: UTC+1 (CET)

Gazi Baba (Macedonian: Гази Баба, Albanian: Gazi Babë) is one of the ten municipalities that make up the City of Skopje, the capital of North Macedonia. The municipality administration consists of a council and mayor.

== Geography ==
The municipality borders Petrovec Municipality, Studeničani Municipality and Aerodrom Municipality to the south, Centar Municipality, Čair Municipality and Butel Municipality to the west, Lipkovo Municipality to the northeast, and Aračinovo Municipality and Ilinden Municipality to the east.

== Demographics ==
According to the 2021 North Macedonia census, Gazi Baba municipality has 69,626 inhabitants, making it the most populous municipality in Greater Skopje. Ethnic groups in the municipality include:

| | 2002 | | 2021 | |
| | Number | % | Number | % |
| TOTAL | 72,617 | 100 | 69,626 | 100 |
| Macedonians | 53,497 | 73.67 | 45,242 | 64.98 |
| Albanians | 12,502 | 17.2 | 14,146 | 20.32 |
| Roma | 2,082 | 2.87 | 1,922 | 2.76 |
| Serbs | 2,097 | 2.89 | 1,328 | 1.91 |
| Bosniaks | 710 | 0.98 | 753 | 1.08 |
| Turks | 606 | 0.83 | 468 | 0.67 |
| Vlachs | 236 | 0.32 | 185 | 0.27 |
| Other / Undeclared / Unknown | 887 | 1.22 | 580 | 0.83 |
| Persons for whom data are taken from administrative sources | | | 5,002 | 7.18 |

=== Religious affiliation ===
Religion according to the 2002 Macedonia census and 2021 North Macedonia census:

| | 2002 | | 2021 | |
| | Number | % | Number | % |
| TOTAL | 72,617 | 100 | 69,626 | 100 |
| Orthodox | 54,637 | 75.2 | 38,116 | 67.2 |
| Christians | 14 | 0.02 | 8,518 | 67.2 |
| Catholics | 248 | 0.34 | 148 | 67.2 |
| Islam | 15,968 | 22.0 | 17,476 | 25.1 |
| Others | 1,750 | 0.62 | 366 | 0.53 |
| Persons for whom data are taken from administrative sources | n/a | n/a | 5,002 | 7.18 |

=== Demographic trends ===
- Live births by ethnic affiliation of mother, 2010-2022

| | Macedonians | | Albanians | | Turks | | Serbs | | Roma | | Bosniaks | | Others | | TOTAL |
| Year | Births | % | Births | % | Births | % | Births | % | Births | % | Births | % | Births | % | Births |
| 2010 | 536 | 60.91 | 240 | 27.27 | 4 | 0.45 | 6 | 0.68 | 76 | 8.64 | 6 | 0.68 | 12 | 1.36 | 880 |
| 2011 | 498 | 58.18 | 247 | 28.86 | 7 | 0.82 | 9 | 1.05 | 67 | 7.83 | 9 | 1.05 | 19 | 2.22 | 856 |
| 2012 | 523 | 60.18 | 260 | 29.92 | 5 | 0.58 | 9 | 1.04 | 57 | 6.56 | 8 | 0.92 | 7 | 0.81 | 869 |
| 2013 | 499 | 56.13 | 287 | 32.28 | 8 | 0.90 | 4 | 0.45 | 69 | 7.76 | 8 | 0.90 | 14 | 1.57 | 889 |
| 2014 | 513 | 58.49 | 282 | 32.16 | 5 | 0.57 | 2 | 0.23 | 61 | 6.96 | 4 | 0.46 | 10 | 1.14 | 877 |
| 2015 | 494 | 61.75 | 231 | 28.88 | 8 | 1.00 | 2 | 0.25 | 46 | 5.75 | 7 | 0.88 | 12 | 1.50 | 800 |
| 2016 | 543 | 62.49 | 242 | 27.85 | 4 | 0.46 | 7 | 0.81 | 52 | 5.98 | 9 | 1.04 | 12 | 1.38 | 869 |
| 2017 | 428 | 56.39 | 252 | 33.20 | 4 | 0.53 | 5 | 0.66 | 42 | 5.53 | 6 | 0.79 | 22 | 2.90 | 759 |
| 2018 | 467 | 61.21 | 224 | 29.36 | 3 | 0.39 | 5 | 0.66 | 50 | 6.55 | 8 | 1.05 | 6 | 0.79 | 763 |
| 2019 | 424 | 60.49 | 217 | 30.96 | 4 | 0.57 | 2 | 0.29 | 43 | 6.13 | 5 | 0.71 | 6 | 0.86 | 701 |
| 2020 | 447 | 59.76 | 236 | 31.55 | 5 | 0.67 | 3 | 0.40 | 43 | 5.75 | 7 | 0.94 | 7 | 0.94 | 748 |
| 2021 | 419 | 59.60 | 219 | 31.15 | 2 | 0.28 | 3 | 0.43 | 46 | 6.54 | 10 | 1.42 | 4 | 0.57 | 703 |
| 2022 | 394 | 59.70 | 203 | 30.76 | 6 | 0.91 | 6 | 0.91 | 33 | 5.00 | 10 | 1.52 | 8 | 1.21 | 660 |
| 2023 | 355 | 54.03 | 232 | 35.31 | 7 | 1.07 | 3 | 0.46 | 50 | 7.61 | 4 | 0.61 | 6 | 0.91 | 657 |

== Inhabited places ==
There are 15 inhabited places in this municipality.

| Inhabited Places | Total | Macedonians | Albanians | Turks | Roma | Vlachs | Serbs | Bosnians | Others |
|---|---|---|---|---|---|---|---|---|---|
| Gazi Baba Municipality | 69,626 | 45,242 | 14,146 | 468 | 1,922 | 185 | 1,328 | 753 | 5,582 |
| Brnjarci | 1.254 | 460 | 770 | - | - | - | 1 | - | 23 |
| Bulačani | 1.147 | 1.015 | 11 | - | 1 | - | 4 | 1 | 15 |
| Čento | 7.829 | 329 | 6.985 | 20 | - | - | 42 | 96 | 357 |
| Creševo | 982 | 911 | - | - | - | - | 8 | - | 63 |
| Gazi Baba | 38.426 | 28.887 | 2.775 | 413 | 1.099 | 145 | 1.026 | 607 | 3.494 |
| Goce Delčev | 1.402 | 1.205 | 71 | 2 | 15 | - | 10 | 4 | 95 |
| Idrizovo | 1.824 | 826 | 747 | 15 | 11 | - | 9 | 29 | 187 |
| Indžikovo | 4.324 | 2.983 | 527 | 3 | 413 | 32 | 49 | 13 | 305 |
| Jurumleri | 3.256 | 2.522 | 54 | - | 342 | 7 | 62 | - | 269 |
| Raštak | 457 | 430 | - | - | - | - | 2 | - | 25 |
| Smilkovci | 371 | 348 | - | - | - | - | - | - | 23 |
| Stajkovci | 4.394 | 2.877 | 1.117 | 6 | 38 | 1 | 26 | 1 | 328 |
| Stračinci | 1.136 | 341 | 775 | 1 | - | - | - | - | 19 |
| Trubarevo | 2.470 | 1.772 | 334 | 8 | 4 | - | 85 | 2 | 265 |
| Viniče | 354 | 336 | - | - | - | - | 4 | - | 14 |

== Sports ==
Football clubs FK Skopje and FK Metalurg Skopje play their home games at the Železarnica Stadium in Gazi Baba.
