= Goce Delčev, Gazi Baba =

Goce Delčev Гоце Делчев
- Village
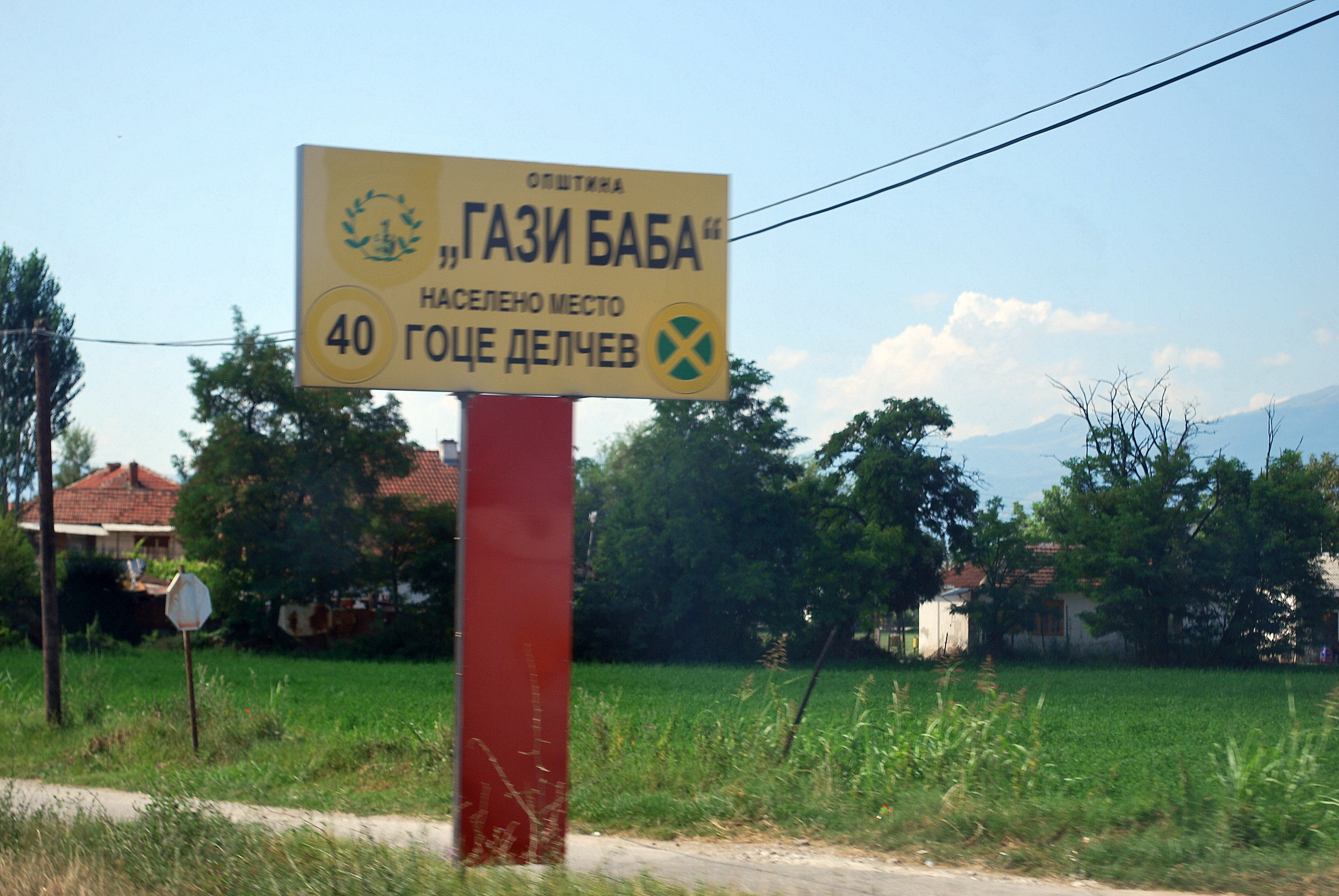

- Location in Gazi Baba Municipality

- Location within Republic of North Macedonia
- Coordinates: 41°58′25″N 21°32′35″E
- Country: North Macedonia
- Region: Skopje
- Municipality: Gazi Baba

Population (2021)
  - Total: 1,402
- Time zone: UTC+1 (CET)
  - Summer (DST): UTC+2 (CEST)
- Car plates: SK
- Website: .

Goce Delčev (Macedonian: Гоце Делчев) is a village in the municipality of Gazi Baba, Republic of North Macedonia.

== Demographics ==
According to the 2021 census, the village had a total of 1402 inhabitants. Ethnic groups in the village include:

- Macedonians 1.205
- Persons for whom data are taken from administrative sources 86
- Albanians 71
- Romani 15
- Serbs 10
- Turks 2
- Bosniaks 4
- Others 9

Year	Macedonian	Albanian	Turks	Romani	Vlachs	Serbs	Bosniaks	Others	Persons for whom data are taken from admin. sources	Total
2002	1.291	62	8	14	3	20	...	7	n/a	1.405
2021	1.205	71	2	15	...	10	4	9	86	1.402

== Sports ==
The local football club is FK Goce Delčev Skopsko Pole and they play in Macedonia's fourth tier.
