= Trubarevo, Gazi Baba =

Trubarevo Трубарево Trubarevë
- Village
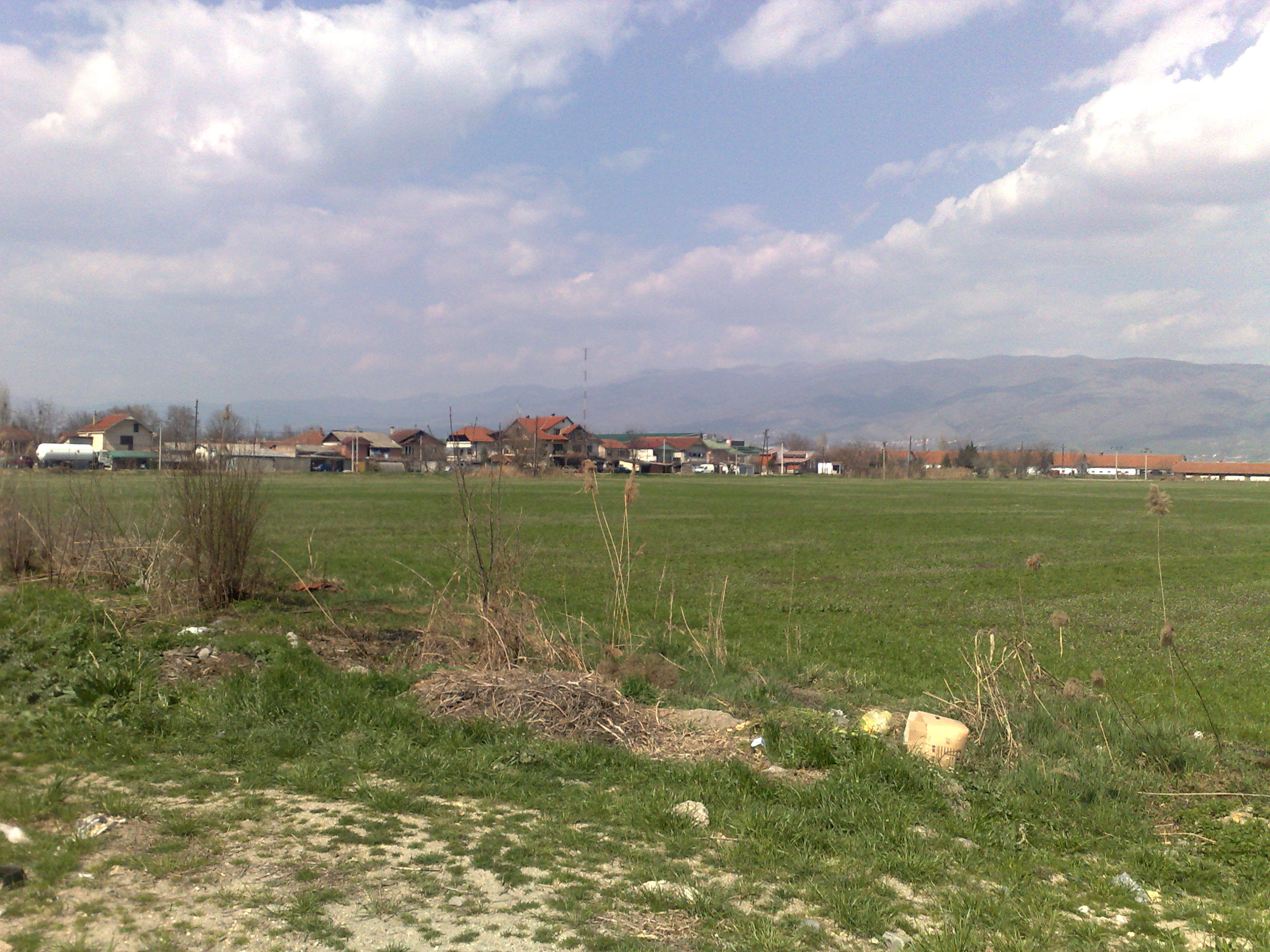

- Location in Gazi Baba Municipality

- Location within North Macedonia
- Coordinates: 41°59′N 21°32′E
- Country: North Macedonia
- Region: Skopje
- Municipality: Gazi Baba

Population (2021)
  - Total: 2,470
- Time zone: UTC+1 (CET)
  - Summer (DST): UTC+2 (CEST)
- Car plates: SK
- Website: .

Trubarevo (Macedonian: Трубарево, Albanian: Trubarevë) is a village in the municipality of Gazi Baba, North Macedonia.

== Demographics ==
According to the 2021 census, the village had a total of 2.470 inhabitants. Ethnic groups in the village include:

- Macedonians 1.772
- Albanians 334
- Persons for whom data are taken from administrative sources 221
- Serbs 85
- Turks 8
- Romani 4
- Bosnians 2
- Others 44

| Year | Macedonian | Albanian | Turks | Romani | Vlachs | Serbs | Bosniaks | Others | Total |
|---|---|---|---|---|---|---|---|---|---|
| 2002 | 1 973 | 494 | 12 | 14 | ... | 124 | ... | 52 | 2.669 |
| 2021 | 1.772 | 334 | 8 | 4 | ... | 85 | 2 | 265 | 2.470 |
