= Smilkovci =

Smilkovci Смиљковци
- Village
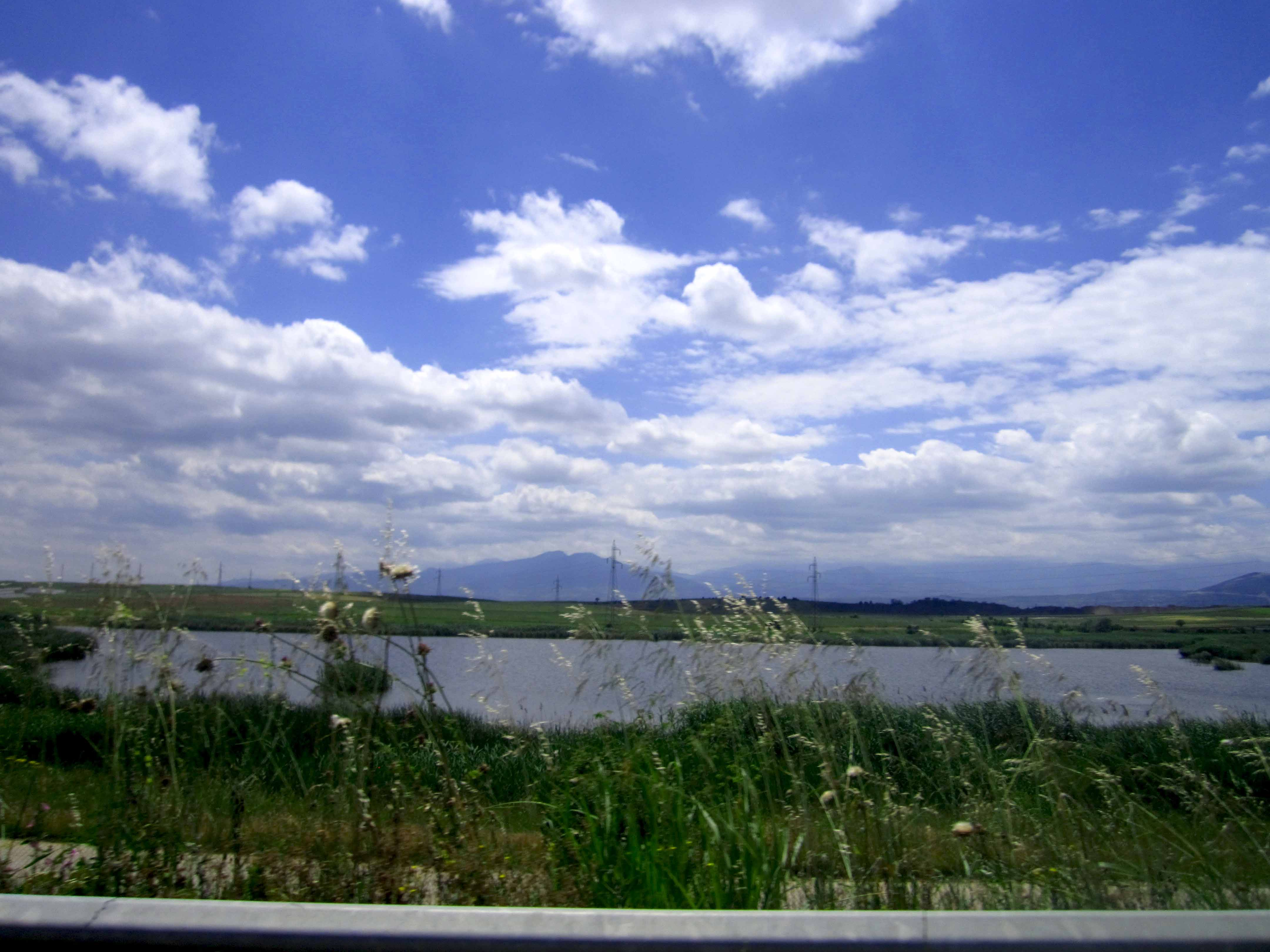

- Location in Gazi Baba Municipality

- Location within North Macedonia
- Coordinates: 42.036669°N 21.493042°E
- Country: North Macedonia
- Region: Skopje
- Municipality: Gazi Baba

Population (2021)
  - Total: 371
- Time zone: UTC+1 (CET)
  - Summer (DST): UTC+2 (CEST)
- Website: .

Smilkovci (Macedonian: Смиљковци) is a village in the municipality of Gazi Baba, North Macedonia.

== Demographics ==
According to the 2021 census, the village had a total of 371 inhabitants. Ethnic groups in the village include:

- Macedonians 348
- Persons for whom data are taken from administrative sources 21
- Others 2

Year	Macedonian	Albanian	Turks	Romani	Vlachs	Serbs	Bosniaks	Others	Persons for whom data are taken from admin. sources	Total
2002	341	...	...	...	...	3	...	1	n/a	345
2021	348	...	...	...	...	...	...	2	21	371
