= Ǵorče Petrov, Skopje =

Neighbourhood in Skopje, North Macedonia

Ǵorče Petrov Ѓорче Петров
- Neighbourhood
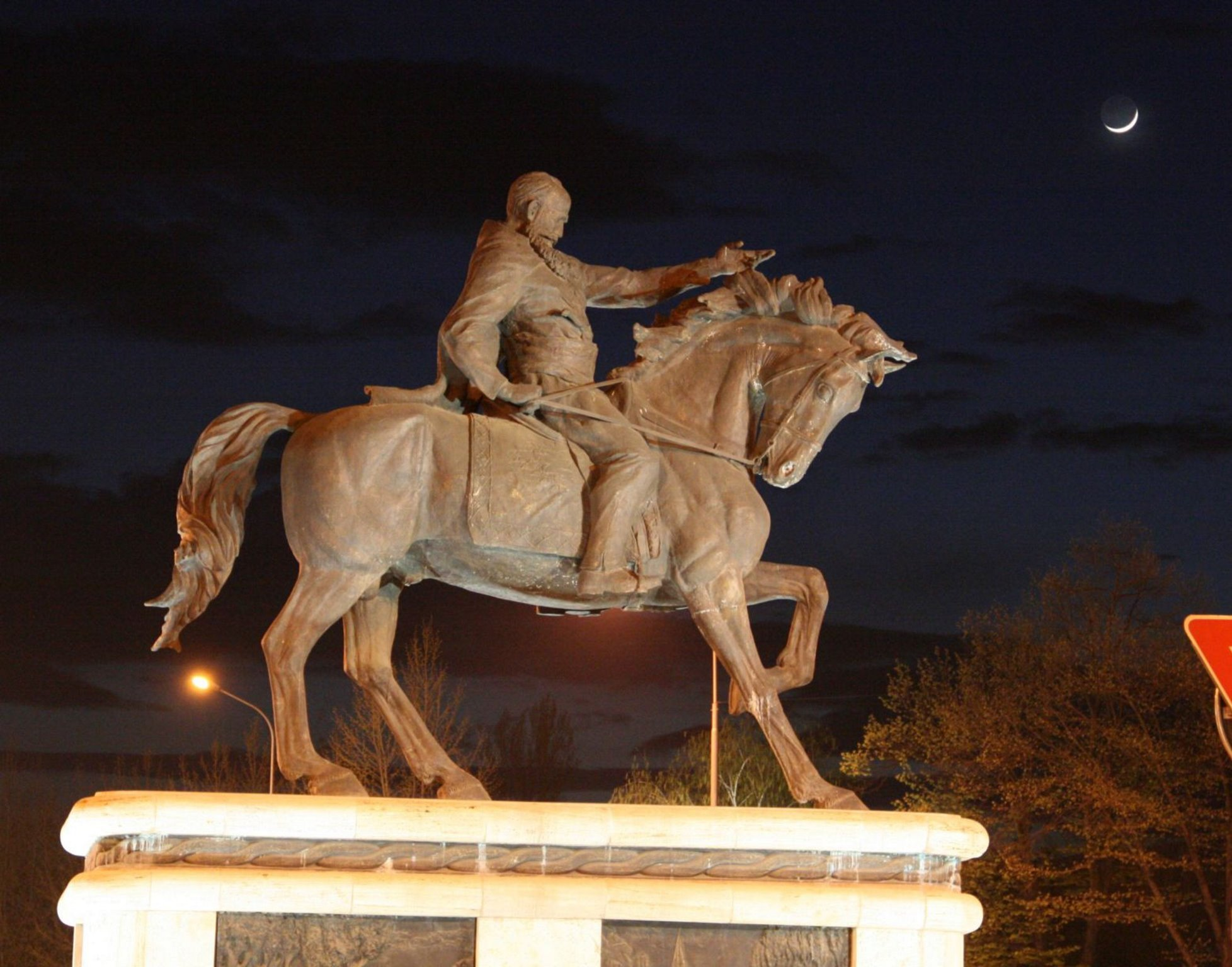

- Location within North Macedonia
- Coordinates: 42°00′N 21°21′E
- Country: North Macedonia
- Region: Skopje
- Municipality: Ǵorče Petrov

Population (2021)
  - Total: 34,040
- Time zone: UTC+1 (CET)
  - Summer (DST): UTC+2 (CEST)
- Car plates: SK
- Website: .

Ǵorče Petrov (Macedonian: Ѓорче Петров) is a neighbourhood in the City of Skopje, North Macedonia, and the seat of Ǵorče Petrov Municipality.

== Demographics ==
As of the 2021 census, Ǵorče Petrov had 34,040 residents with the following ethnic composition:

- Macedonians 27,506
- Persons for whom data are taken from administrative sources 2,659
- Roma 1,037
- Serbs 854
- Albanians 671
- Bosniaks 452
- Turks 271
- Vlachs 148
- Others 442

According to the 2002 census, the village had a total of 9,041 inhabitants. Ethnic groups in the village include:

- Macedonians 8,119
- Serbs 453
- Albanians 124
- Bosniaks 54
- Vlachs 45
- Romani 39
- Turks 39
- Others 168

== Sports ==
Local football club FK Makedonija have won the Macedonian league title once.
