= Goce Delčev Square =

Town square in Strumica, North Macedonia

Coordinates: 41°26′20.8″N 22°38′14.3″E

Square "Goce Delčev"
- Плоштад "Гоце Делчев"
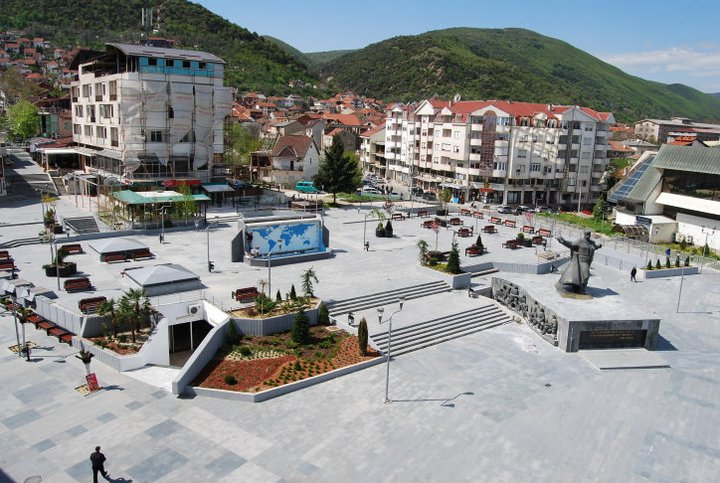
- Panorama of the upper part of the square, with the statue of Goce Delčev on the right

General information
- Location: Strumica, North Macedonia
- Elevation: 256 m (840 ft)
- Inaugurated: 10 December 2010
- Renovation cost: ~ 3.5 million euros
- Owner: Municipality of Strumica

Technical details
- Floor count: 2
- Floor area: 23.485 m^{2} (252.79 sq ft)

Goce Delčev Square (Macedonian: Плоштад „Гоце Делчев“, romanized: Ploštad „Goce Delčev“) is the main public square in the city of Strumica, situated in the southeastern part of North Macedonia. It is one of the biggest city squares in the country with a total area of 23,485 square metres. It is named after the revolutionary Goce Delčev, who has a monument on the square, built in the 1970s. The square was reconstructed in 2010 and is split on two floors. The first level is an underground road junction with a parking lot, while the second floor is an open pedestrian space filled with statues, buildings and decorative equipment. Before the reconstruction, the square had only a small area focused on Delčev's monument. The Strumičanka pod maska statue is also located in the town square.

A copper star was placed in the center of the open space in honor of the Macedonian footballer Goran Pandev, who in 2010 won the titles of the Champions League and the FIFA Club World Cup in the FC Inter jersey. The star was torn off and stolen in November 2018 by unknown perpetrators.

About 3.5 million euros were spent for the reconstruction, provided by the Municipality of Strumica. The funds for the bronze casting of the monument "Strumica woman under a mask" were provided by the International Art Colony. The clock tower is a donation from the construction company Adora Engineering. The square was officially opened on December 10, 2010, the day before the patron saint's day of Strumica.
