= Angelci =

Angelci Ангелци
- Location within North Macedonia
- Coordinates: 41.478445°N 22.614805°E
- Country: North Macedonia
- Region: Southeastern
- Municipality: Vasilevo

Population
  - Total: 869
- Time zone: UTC+1 (CET)
  - Summer (DST): UTC+2 (CEST)

Angelci (Macedonian: Ангелци) is a village in the municipality of Vasilevo, North Macedonia.

== Demographics ==
According to the 2002 census, the village had a total of 913 inhabitants. Ethnic groups in the village include:

- Macedonians 857
- Turks 34
- Serbs 1
- Others 21

As of 2021, the village of Angelci has 869 inhabitants and the ethnic composition was the following:

- Macedonians – 568
- turks – 211
- Romani – 1
- others – 42
- Person without Data - 47
