= Gjorče Petrov Municipality =

Municipality of North Macedonia

Municipality of Gjorče Petrov Општина Ѓорче Петров
- City municipality
- Flag Coat of arms

- Coordinates: 42.01°N 21.36°E
- Country: North Macedonia
- Region: Skopje
- Municipal Seat: Ǵorče Petrov

Government
  - Mayor: Aleksandar Stojkoski (VMRO-DPMNE)

Population
  - Total: 44,844
- Time zone: UTC+1 (CET)
- Website: www.opstinagpetrov.gov.mk

Gjorče Petrov (Macedonian: Ѓорче Петров) is one of the ten municipalities that compose the city of Skopje, the capital of North Macedonia. It is named after the revolutionary Gjorče Petrov.

== Geography ==
Gjorče Petrov borders

- Saraj to the southwest,
- Karpoš to the southeast,
- Čučer-Sandevo to the east, and
- Kosovo to the north.

The municipality is the place of the confluence of the Treska and Vardar rivers.

== Demographics ==
According to the 2002 Macedonia census, the municipality has 41,634 inhabitants. According to the 2021 North Macedonia census, this municipality has 44,844 inhabitants. Ethnic groups in the municipality include:

	2002		2021	
	Number	%	Number	%
TOTAL	41,634	100	44,844	100
Macedonians	35,455	85.16	35,971	80.21
Albanians	1,597	3.84	1,765	3.94
Serbs	1,730	4.16	1,266	2.82
Roma	1,249	3	1,068	2.38
Bosniaks	489	1.17	459	1.02
Turks	368	0.88	272	0.61
Vlachs	109	0.26	156	0.35
Other / Undeclared / Unknown	637	1.53	576	1.29
Persons for whom data are taken from administrative sources			3,311	7.38

== Sports ==
Football club FK Makedonija Gjorče Petrov has played in the top tier of Macedonian football for several years. Their home stadium is the Gjorče Petrov Stadium.
