= Idrizovo =

Idrizovo Идризово Idrizovë
- Village
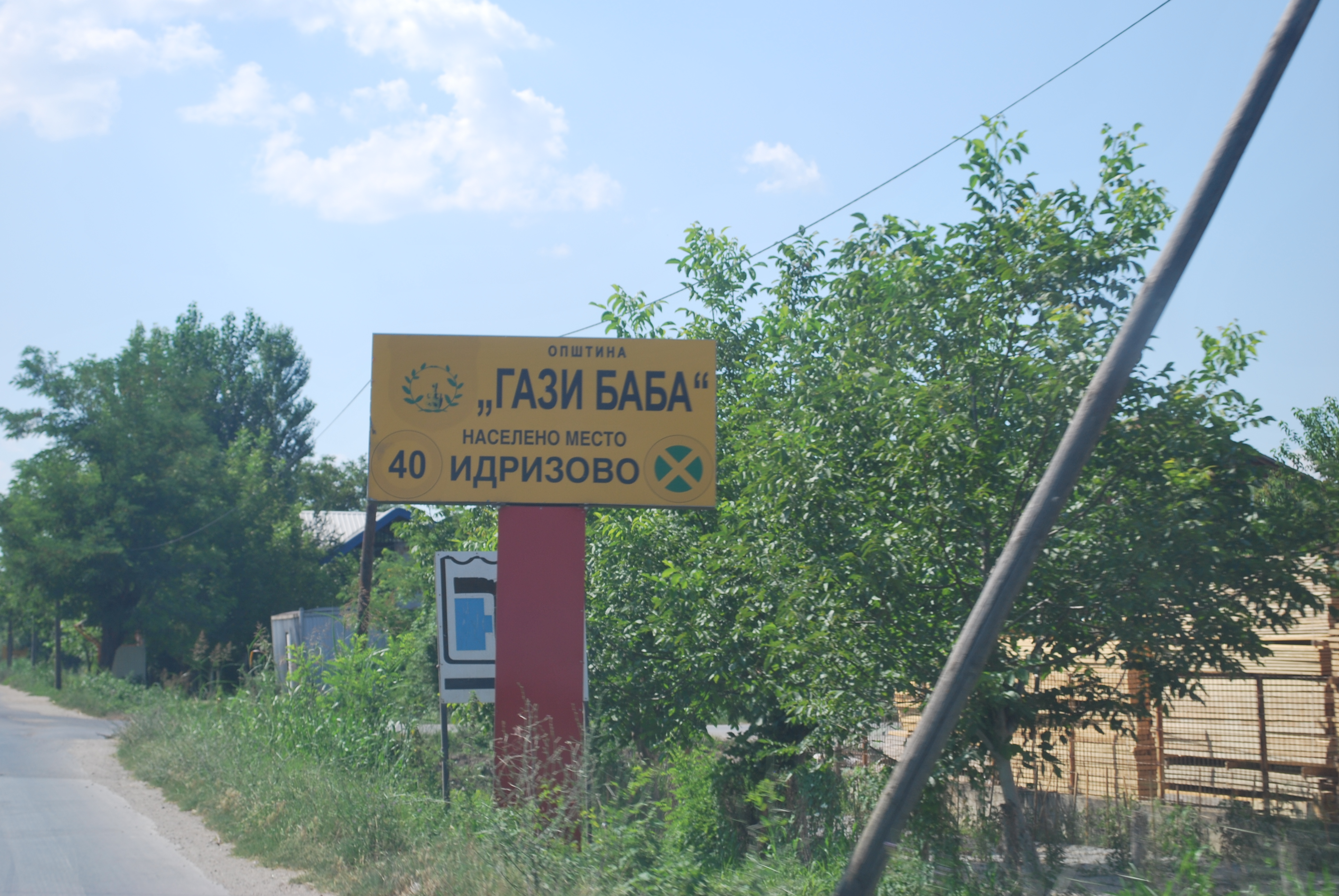
- Road sign in Idrizovo

- Location in Gazi Baba Municipality

- Location within Republic of North Macedonia
- Coordinates: 41°58′N 21°35′E
- Country: North Macedonia
- Region: Skopje
- Municipality: Gazi Baba

Population (2021)
  - Total: 1,824
- Time zone: UTC+1 (CET)
  - Summer (DST): UTC+2 (CEST)
- Car plates: SK
- Website: .

Idrizovo (Macedonian: Идризово, Albanian: Idrizovë) is a settlement in the outskirts of the city of Skopje within the municipality of Gazi Baba, Republic of North Macedonia.

== Demographics ==
According to the 2021 census, the village had a total of 1.824 inhabitants. Ethnic groups in the village include:

- Macedonians: 826
- Albanians: 747
- Persons for whom data are taken from administrative sources: 162
- Bosniaks: 29
- Turks: 15
- Romani: 11
- Serbs: 9
- Others: 25

Year	Macedonian	Albanian	Turks	Romani	Vlachs	Serbs	Bosniaks	Others	Persons for whom data are taken from admin. sources	Total
2002	686	774	19	2	...	8	28	72	n/a	1.589
2021	826	747	15	11	...	9	29	25	162	1.824

== Correctional facility ==
With the establishment of the Socialist Federal Republic of Yugoslavia following the Second World War, an internment camp was built in the area wherein political prisoners could be detained. Today, the prison remains and serves as one of the largest correctional facilities in the country. Known as Kolonija Idrizovo the correctional facility had a population of 451 (2002 census) and included the following ethnic groups:

- Macedonians: 401
- Albanians: 35
- Turks: 4
- Romani: 2
- Serbs: 8
- Others: 1
