= Stračinci =

Stračinci Страчинци Straçincë
- Village
- Location in Gazi Baba Municipality

- Location within North Macedonia
- Coordinates: 42°03′N 21°32′E
- Country: North Macedonia
- Region: Skopje
- Municipality: Gazi Baba

Population (2021)
  - Total: 1,136
- Time zone: UTC+1 (CET)
  - Summer (DST): UTC+2 (CEST)
- Car plates: SK
- Website: .

Stračinci (Macedonian: Страчинци, Albanian: Straçincë) is a village in the municipality of Gazi Baba, North Macedonia.

== Demographics ==
According to the 2021 census, the village had a total of 1.136 inhabitants. Ethnic groups in the village include:

- Albanians 775
- Macedonians 341
- Turks 1
- Others 19

Year	Macedonian	Albanian	Turks	Romani	Vlachs	Serbs	Bosniaks	Others	Total
2002	396	787	1	...	...	...	...		1.185
2021	341	775	1	...	...	...	...	19	1.136
