= Bulačani =

Bulačani Булачани
- Village
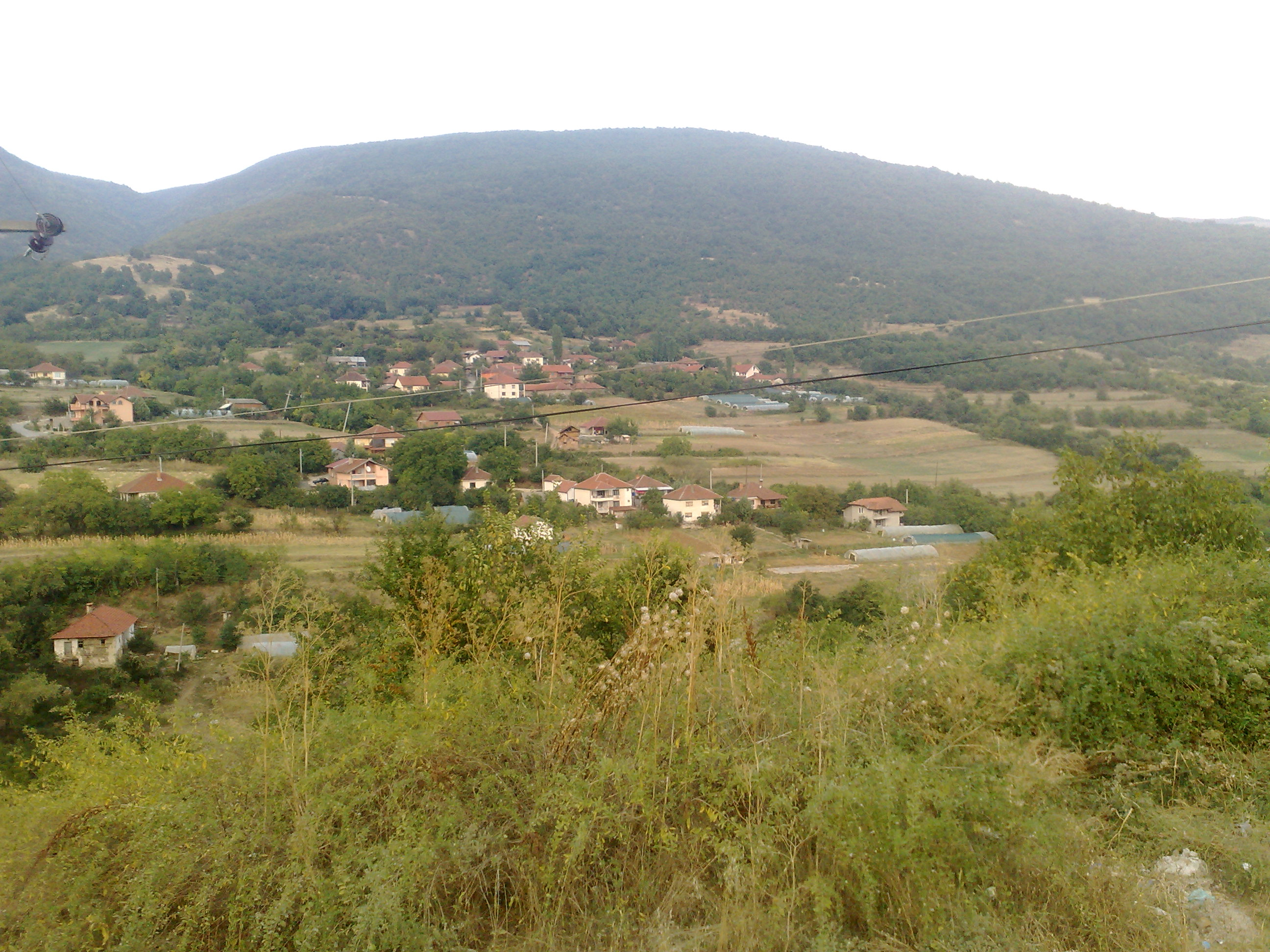

- Location in Gazi Baba Municipality

- Location within North Macedonia
- Coordinates: 42.068170°N 21.501910°E
- Country: North Macedonia
- Region: Skopje
- Municipality: Gazi Baba

Population (2021)
  - Total: 1,147
- Time zone: UTC+1 (CET)
  - Summer (DST): UTC+2 (CEST)
- Website: .

Bulačani (Macedonian: Булачани) is a village in the municipality of Gazi Baba, North Macedonia.

== History ==
According to the 1467–68 Ottoman defter, Bulačani appears to be inhabited by an Albanian population. Due to Slavicisation, some families had a mixed Slav-Albanian anthroponomy–usually a Slavic first name and an Albanian last name or last names with Albanian patronyms and Slavic suffixes.

== Demographics ==
According to the 2021 census, the village had a total of 1,147 inhabitants. Ethnic groups in the village include:

- Macedonians 1,015
- Persons for whom data are taken from administrative sources 115
- Albanians 11
- Serbs 4
- Romani 1
- Bosniaks 1

Year	Macedonian	Albanian	Turks	Romani	Vlachs	Serbs	Bosniaks	Persons for whom data are taken from admin. sources	Total
2002	1.098	...	...	...	...	6	...	...	1.104
2021	1.015	11	...	1	...	4	1	115	1.147
