= Mirkovci, North Macedonia =

Mirkovci Мирковци
- Village
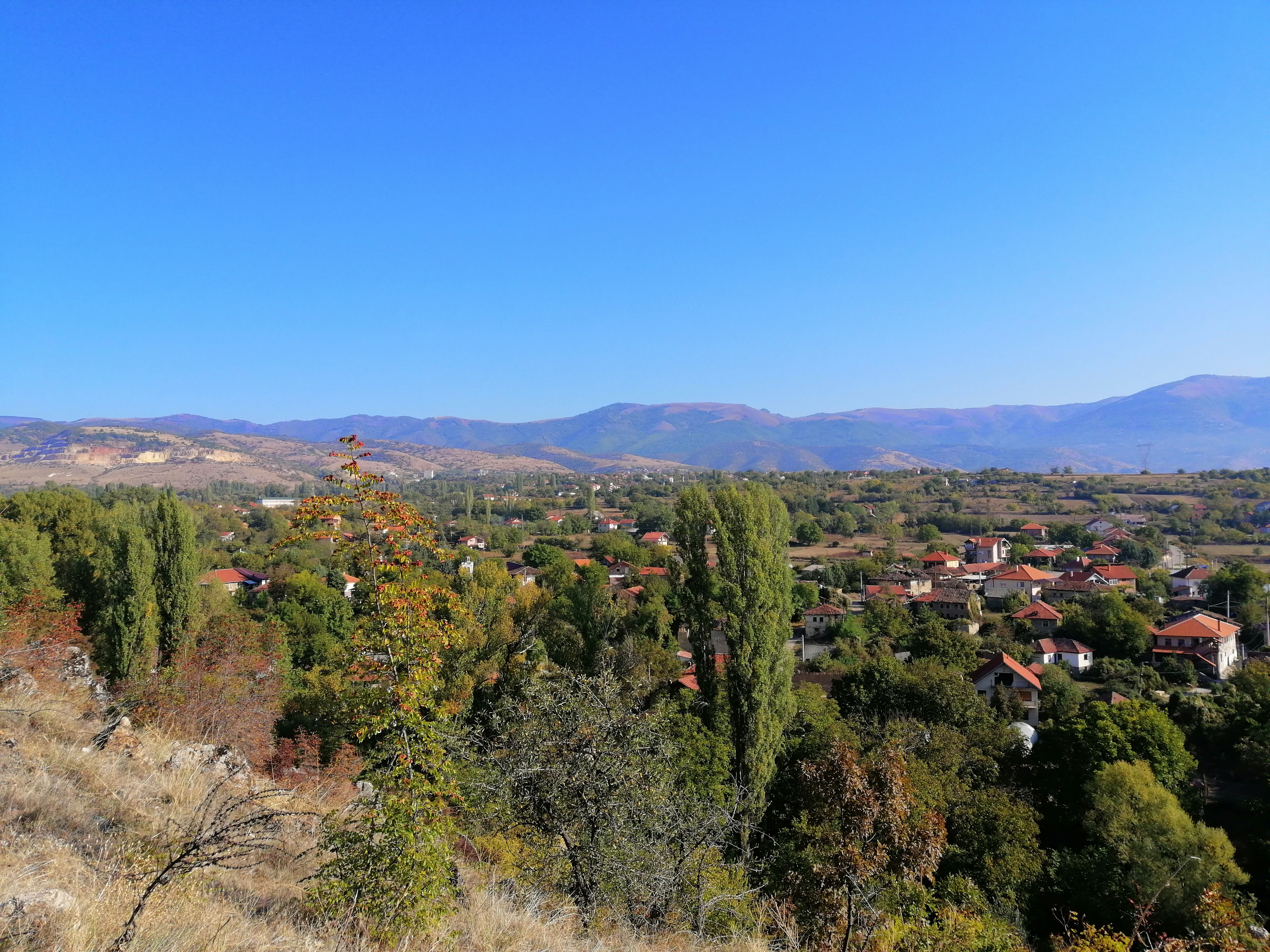

- Location within North Macedonia
- Coordinates: 42.094315°N 21.406387°E
- Country: North Macedonia
- Region: Skopje
- Municipality: Čučer-Sandevo

Population (2021)
  - Total: 1,165
- Time zone: UTC+1 (CET)
  - Summer (DST): UTC+2 (CEST)
- Website: .

Mirkovci (Macedonian: Мирковци) is a village in the municipality of Čučer-Sandevo, North Macedonia.

== History ==
According to the 1467-68 Ottoman defter, Mirkovci exhibits a mixture of Orthodox Christian Slavic and Albanian anthroponyms, likely along with a small Vlach presence. Some families had a mixed Slav-Albanian anthroponomy.

== Demographics ==
As of the 2021 census, Mirkovci had 1,165 residents with the following ethnic composition:

- Macedonians 894
- Serbs 77
- Persons for whom data are taken from administrative sources 172
- Others 16
- Vlachs 6

According to the 2002 census, the village had a total of 969 inhabitants. Ethnic groups in the village include:

- Macedonians 883
- Serbs 72
- Romani 9
- Aromanians 1
- Others 4
