= Raštak =

Raštak Раштак
- Village
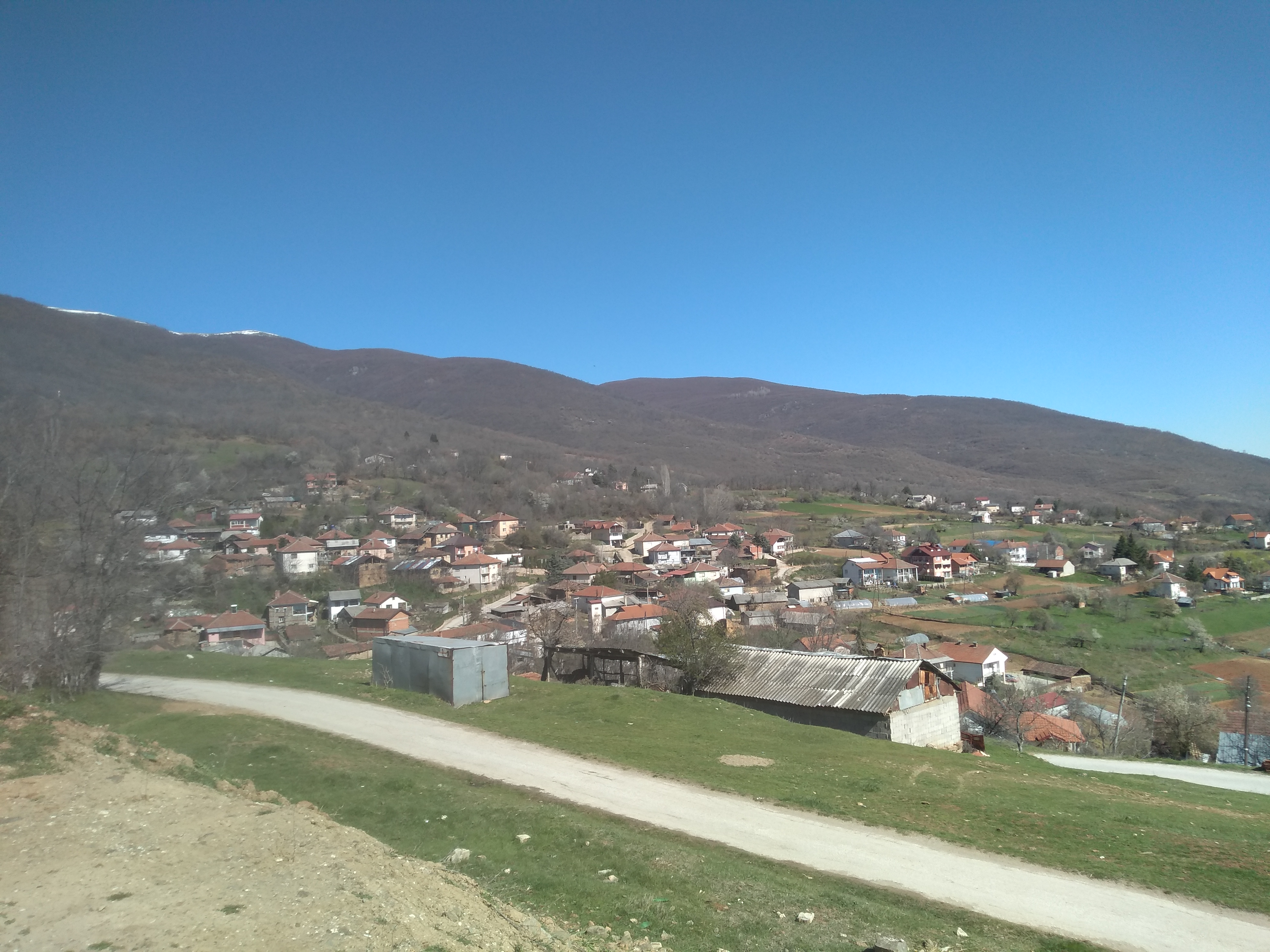

- Location in Gazi Baba Municipality

- Location within North Macedonia
- Coordinates: 42.085561°N 21.489293°E
- Country: North Macedonia
- Region: Skopje
- Municipality: Gazi Baba

Population (2021)
  - Total: 457
- Time zone: UTC+1 (CET)
  - Summer (DST): UTC+2 (CEST)
- Website: .

Raštak (Macedonian: Раштак) is a village in the municipality of Gazi Baba, North Macedonia.

== Demographics ==
In statistics gathered by Vasil Kanchov in 1900, the village was inhabited by 270 Muslim Albanians and 230 Christian Bulgarians.

According to the 2021 census, the village had a total of 457 inhabitants. Ethnic groups in the village include:

- 430 Macedonians
- 17 Persons for whom data are taken from administrative sources
- 2 Serbs
- 8 Others

Year	Macedonian	Albanian	Turks	Romani	Vlachs	Serbs	Bosniaks	Others	Total
2002	362	...	...	...	...	2	...	3	367
2021	430	...	...	...	...	2	...	25	457

== Sports ==
The local football club is FK Raštak.
