= Stajkovci =

Stajkovci Стајковци Stajkoc
- Village
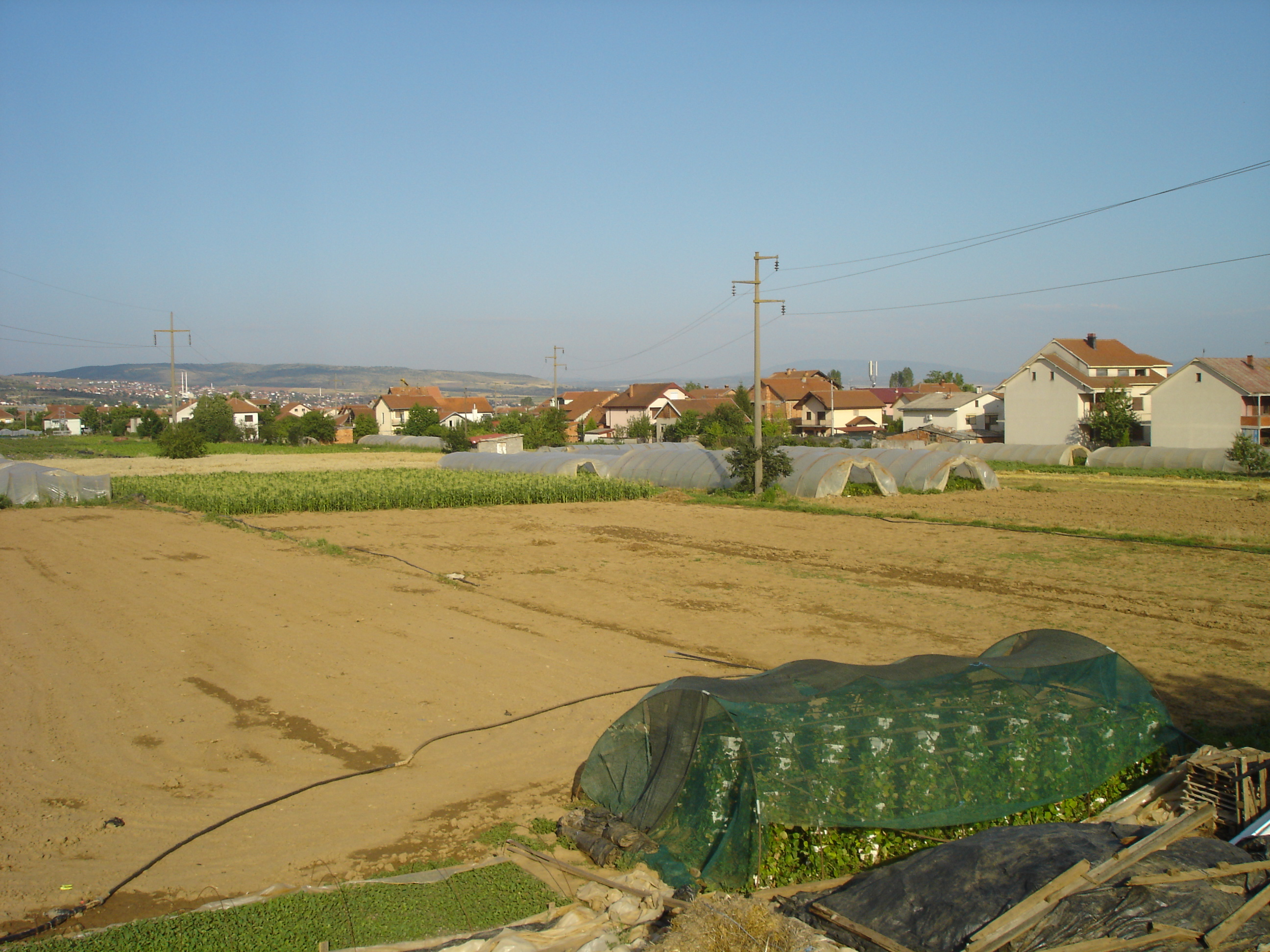

- Location in Gazi Baba Municipality

- Location within Republic of North Macedonia
- Coordinates: 42°02′N 21°31′E
- Country: North Macedonia
- Region: Skopje
- Municipality: Gazi Baba

Population (2021)
  - Total: 4,394
- Time zone: UTC+1 (CET)
  - Summer (DST): UTC+2 (CEST)
- Car plates: SK
- Website: .

Stajkovci (Macedonian: Стајковци, Albanian: Stajkoc) is a village in the municipality of Gazi Baba, Republic of North Macedonia.

== Demographics ==
According to the 2021 census, the village had a total of 4.394 inhabitants. Ethnic groups in the village include:

- Macedonians 2877
- Albanians 1117
- Persons for whom data are taken from administrative sources 316
- Romani 38
- Serbs 26
- Turks 6
- Vlachs 1
- Bosniaks 1
- Others 12

Year	Macedonian	Albanian	Turks	Romani	Vlachs	Serbs	Bosniaks	Others	Total
2002	3207	232	2	43	...	38	...	10	3532
2021	2877	1117	6	38	1	26	1	328	4394
