= List of people from Struga =

The following is a list of people from the town of Struga or the Struga Municipality, in southwestern North Macedonia.

== Arts ==
- Dimitar Miladinov, writer, poet and folklorist
- Konstantin Miladinov, writer, poet and folklorist
- Vojislav Rakonjac Kokan (1935–1969), Yugoslav film director, born in Struga town.
- Milisav Antonijević - Drimkolski (1913–2001), Serbian educator and writer, born in Labuništa.
- Božidar Pajkić (1908–1995), Serbian actor, born in Struga town.
- Venera Lumani, Albanian singer, born in Radolista.
- Nenad Joldeski, Macedonian writer
- Daniel Kajmakoski, Macedonian singer
- Vangel Kodžoman, Yugoslav-Macedonian painter
- Risto Krle, Yugoslav-Macedonian writer
- Vlado Maleski, author of the Denes nad Makedonija
- Mimoza Nestorova-Tomić, Yugoslav-Macedonian architect, born in Struga town.
- Menil Velioski, folk singer
- Nikola Moushmov, historian and numismatist
- Voydan Chernodrinski, playwright from Selci
- Andjelko Krstić, Serbian writer and playwright, born in Labuništa.
- Milisav Antonijević - Drimkolski (1913–2001), Serbian educator and writer, born in Labuništa.

== Military ==
- Antinogen Hadzhov, IMRO revolutionary, born in Struga town.
- Ilija Ilić (1879–1942), Serbian military, born in Labuništa.
- Hristo Matov (1872–1922), IMRO revolutionary, born in Struga town.
- Anastasia Uzunova (1862–1948), IMRO revolutionary, born in Struga town.
- Cincar Marko Kostić, Serbian revolutionary, born in Dolna Belica.
- Kosta Šumenković (1829–1905), Serbian military, born in Borovac.
- Murat Labënishti (1909–1946), Albanian fascist militiaman, born in Labuništa.

== Politics ==
- Ibrahim Temo, Ottoman politician
- Jovan Mitreski, Macedonian politician
- Nuri Sojliu, signatory of the Albanian Declaration of Independence
- Myrteza Ali Struga, signatory of the Albanian Declaration of Independence
- Vasil Shanto (17 August 1913 – 1 February 1944), a founder of the Albanian Communist Party in Shkodër, parentage from Struga.
- Nikola Šećeroski, Serbian politician and candidate for the presidency, born in Radožda.
- Ilija Šumenković, Serbian minister and ambassador, born in Borovac.

== Religion ==
- Mateja Šumenković (1864–1939), Orthodox priest, born in Borovac.
- Stojan Кrstić (d. 1891), Orthodox priest, born in Podgorac.
- Stoyan Gyurchinov (d. 1927), Orthodox priest and IMRO member, born in Labuništa.

== Business ==
- Cvetko Jovanović (1862–1938), Serbian entrepreneur and benefactor, born in Labuništa.

== Sports ==
- Nijaz Lena, Macedonian footballer
- Mirdi Limani, Albanian-German kickboxer
- Lazo Lipovski, Macedonian football goalkeeper
- Ardit Shaqiri, Macedonian footballer
- Veliče Šumulikoski, Macedonian footballer
- Flamur Tairi, Macedonian footballer
- Veselin Vuković, Serbian handballer, born in Struga town.
- Naumče Mojsovski, Macedonian handballer
- Isnik Alimi, Macedonian footballer, born in Delogoždi.
- Krste Velkovski, Macedonian footballer, born in Vevčani.
- Artim Šakiri, Macedonian international footballer, born in Livada.
- Artim Položani, Macedonian footballer, born in Bidževo
