= Kičevo-Poreče dialect =

Dialect of Macedonian

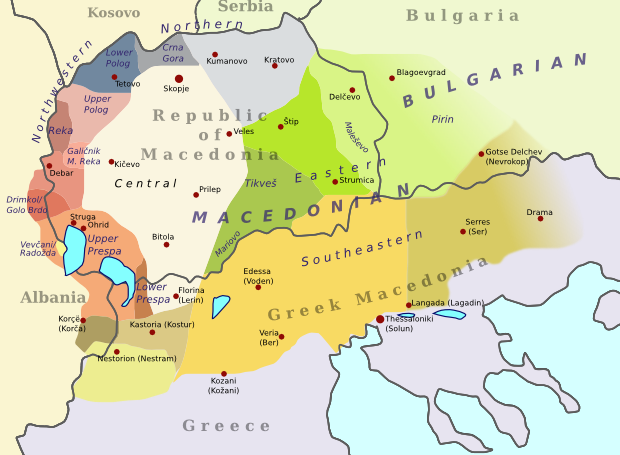
The location of the Kičevo-Poreče dialect among the others Macedonian dialects

The Kičevo-Poreče dialect (Macedonian: Кичевско-поречки дијалект, Kičevsko-porečki dijalekt) is a member of the central subgroup of the western group of dialects of Macedonian. The dialect is spoken in a vast area in North Macedonia and mainly in the cities Kičevo and Makedonski Brod. It is also native to the villages of the region Poreče, such as Samokov and those around Kičevo. Because of the migration of the population from Poreče, the dialect is spoken in the region of Polog and in the capital Skopje. The Kičevo-Poreče dialect is closely related to the Prilep-Bitola dialect, Gostivar dialect with which they share many common characteristics. This dialect can be found in many books and novels, and one of the more popular is the novel "Milion mačenici" by Risto Krle. The Kičevo-Poreče dialect has a significantly small number of Serbian and Turkish loan words than the Macedonian dialects.

== Phonological characteristics ==
- change of the nasal vowel /õ/ with /ɔ/;
- change of the vocal /lˌ/ and vocal /rˌ/;
- use of the consonant groups шт (št) and жд (žd);
- lose of the inter vocal /v/: глава (glava) > глаа (glaa; head).

== Morphological characteristics ==
- use of the dative case for personal names: му рече Стојану (mu reče Stojanu; he told to Stojan);
- use of the diminutive: дете (dete) > детуле (detule; kid);
- use of the suffix -t for third person singular: тој зборува (toj zboruva) > тој зборуват (toj zboruvat; he talks);
- use of the preposition "v" and "vo" (in);
- linking of the prepositions or clitics with the verb: јас ќ’ода (jas ḱ'oda) instead of јас ќе одам (jas ḱe odam; I will go);
- losing of the suffix "-m" for first person singular: јас зборувам (jas zboruvam) > ја зборува (ja zboruva; I talk);
- use of "ja" instead "jas" (I);
- use of "su" instead "sum" (am): јас сум (jas sum) > ја су (ja su; I am).

== Examples of the dialect ==
- Omarno žeško sonce is a song that is written on Kičevo-Poreče dialect.

Омарно жешко сонце грејт
и никој на земата не смејт
очи да отворит, ура, ура.
И никој на земјата не смејт
очи да отворит, напред, напред.

Ја народ црнејт, таму на брего
и ноќта ангел јасно викаше:
„О, Боже, до кога и до Бога?“
и ноќта ангел јасно викаше:
„О, Боже, до кога и до Бога?“

Omarno žeško sonce grejt
i nikoj na zemjata ne smejt
oči da otvorit, ura, ura.
I nikoj na zemjata ne smejt
oči da otvorit, napred, napred.

Ja narod crnejt, tamu na brego
i noḱta angel jasno vikaše:
„O Bože, do koga i do Boga?“
i noḱta angel jasno vikaše:
„O Bože, do koga i do Boga?“

Poreče dialect

A short story on Poreče dialect:

Си‿би́л еден‿си́ромаф. Би́л гла́вен ка‿о́фчар. Еднуш о́фците си‿ле́жале на́‿пладне и то́ј си ‿ле́жел до о́фците со‿ро́ката по́тпрен. Се запа́лило крај‿о́фците о́ген’. Пи́штит не́што во о́гин’от, ле́леет го́рата. Огнот му‿се‿при́бират на‿зми́јата и таа пи́штит. Овја што‿би́л у́бо срце, ка́ко да‿је‿спа́сит зми́јава, се‿пла́шил да не‿го‿и́зеет. Се‿пре́думал на́јпосле и го‿пру́жил ста́пот кеј‿зми́јата. И зми́јата се зафа́тила за‿ста́по и у́горе по‿ро́ка и‿о́колу‿вра́т со‿гла́ата на́прет. И му‿ве́лит зми́јава на‿о́фчарот: „Ајде, ке́ј‿ќе‿те‿но́са ја́, та́мо ќ‿о́јме“.

Kičevo dialect

A short story on Kičevo dialect:

До́јде една‿а́ждеја со‿де́вет глај. Ко‿и‿се‿сја́де, се‿ка́че на‿ено‿те́пе ви́соко. Се‿ра́сплаче и пу́шти три со́лѕи. Ти́е три́‿солѕи го‿одне́соа Ста́мбол поло́јната. Ра́збрал ца́рот за‿таја‿ра́бота, се‿о́пулел на‿те́пето и ре́кол да‿е‿пра́шат ажде́ата што́‿сакат. Ажде́ата ре́кла: „Или ма́ш ми‿на́јдојт ца́рот, или ци́л Ста́мбол ќе‿го‿о́днеса“. Ца́рот се‿се́тил за‿тро́јца бра́ќа што‿живе́еле во‿Ста́мбол. Пра́тил лу́ѓе да‿пра́шаат за‿ти́е тро́јца бра́ќа. Ко‿го пра́шале е́дниот али‿са́кат да‿и‿би́дет ма́ш на‿ажде́ата, то́ј ре́кол оти‿не́ќе, пошто‿си‿и́мал же́на. Го‿пра́шале две́ќиот. То́ј ре́кол: „Ја́ си‿и́мам же́на и е́ден го́лем пи́ф кај‿што‿си во́за ка́јк“. По́шле кај‿поста́риот и му‿ре́кле: „Али са́каш да‿и‿би́диш ма́ш на‿ажде́ата?“ — „Мо́жа, се‿согла́соа“ — рекол тре́ќиот и е‿зе́л ажде́ата за‿же́на и та́ка го‿ку́ртулел Ста́мбол.

== See also ==
- Macedonian language
- Macedonian dialects
