= Gostivar dialect =

Dialect of Macedonian

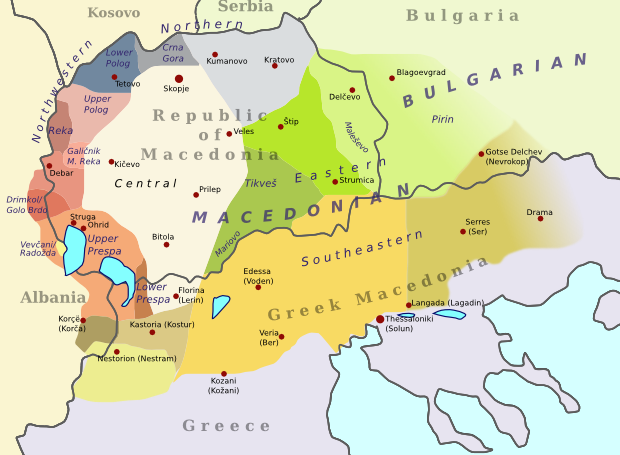
The location of the Gostivar dialect among the others Macedonian dialects

The Gostivar dialect (Macedonian: Гостиварски дијалект, Gostivarski dijalekt) or Upper Polog dialect (Macedonian: Горнополошки дијалект, Gornopološki dijalekt) is a member of the western and north western subgroup of the western group of dialects of Macedonian. The dialect is mainly spoken in the area around the city of Gostivar to the villages Brvenica and Bogovinje on north, Reka region on west, Poreče on east and Galičnik on south. The dialect is closely related with the neighbouring dialects, particularly with the Kičevo-Poreče dialect, Reka dialect and Galičnik dialect. Also in some extent, the dialect shares some similarities with the Tetovo dialect. The dialect is very well known for using masculine forms of direct and indirect objects, for male and female.

== Phonological characteristics ==
- replacement of the letters ќ and ѓ in verbal use with ч and џ, respectively: куќа (kukja) → куча (kucha); Ѓурѓа (Gjurgja) → Џурџа (Djurdja)
- the yat has reflexed into [ɛ]: цена (cena, "price")
- the Proto-Slavic *ǫ has denazalized to [ɤ] in most words: ръка/р'ка (rəka)
- the older [x] has been replaced with [v] in most words: прах (prah) → прав (prav, "dust")
- the consonant group цв- is substituted with цу-: цвет (cvet) → цут (cut, "flower")
- absence of the intervocalic [v] in the plural forms of monosyllabic nouns (e.g. лебо(в)и, дождо(в)и, etc.)

== Morphological characteristics ==
- use of masculine direct and indirect object for males and females: Дај му ја топкава на Тони/ Дај му ја топкава на Ивона (Daj mu ja topkava na Toni/ Daj mu ja topkava na Ivona) - Give this ball to Toni/ Ivona;
- three definite articles pertaining to the position of the object (see Macedonian grammar)
- use of suffix -t for third person singular: тој пишува- тој пишуват (toj pišuva) - he writes

== Examples of the dialect ==
Traditional song on Upper Polog dialect:

Што ќе правиме, чиниме,
со кој мерак ш'о го имаме,
ниту јадиме, пиеме,
ниту слободно спиеме.

Сношти помина покрај нас,
тамо ја најдов мајка ти.
- Добро вечер, стара бабо.
- Дал ти Бог добро, јуначе.

А што ми рече два збора,
два збора, до два изгора.
- Да, море лудо и младо,
не си го губи времето.

Момето ми е свршено,
за друго лудо, порусо,
за друго лудо, порусо,
од тебе многу поарно.

== Works cited ==
- Bojkovska, S.; Pandev, D.; Minova-Ǵurkova, L.; Cvetkovski, Ž. (2001). Makedonski jazik za srednoto obrazovanie (in Macedonian). Skopje: Prosvetno delo AD.
