= Labuništa =

Labuništa Лабуништа Llabunishta
- Village
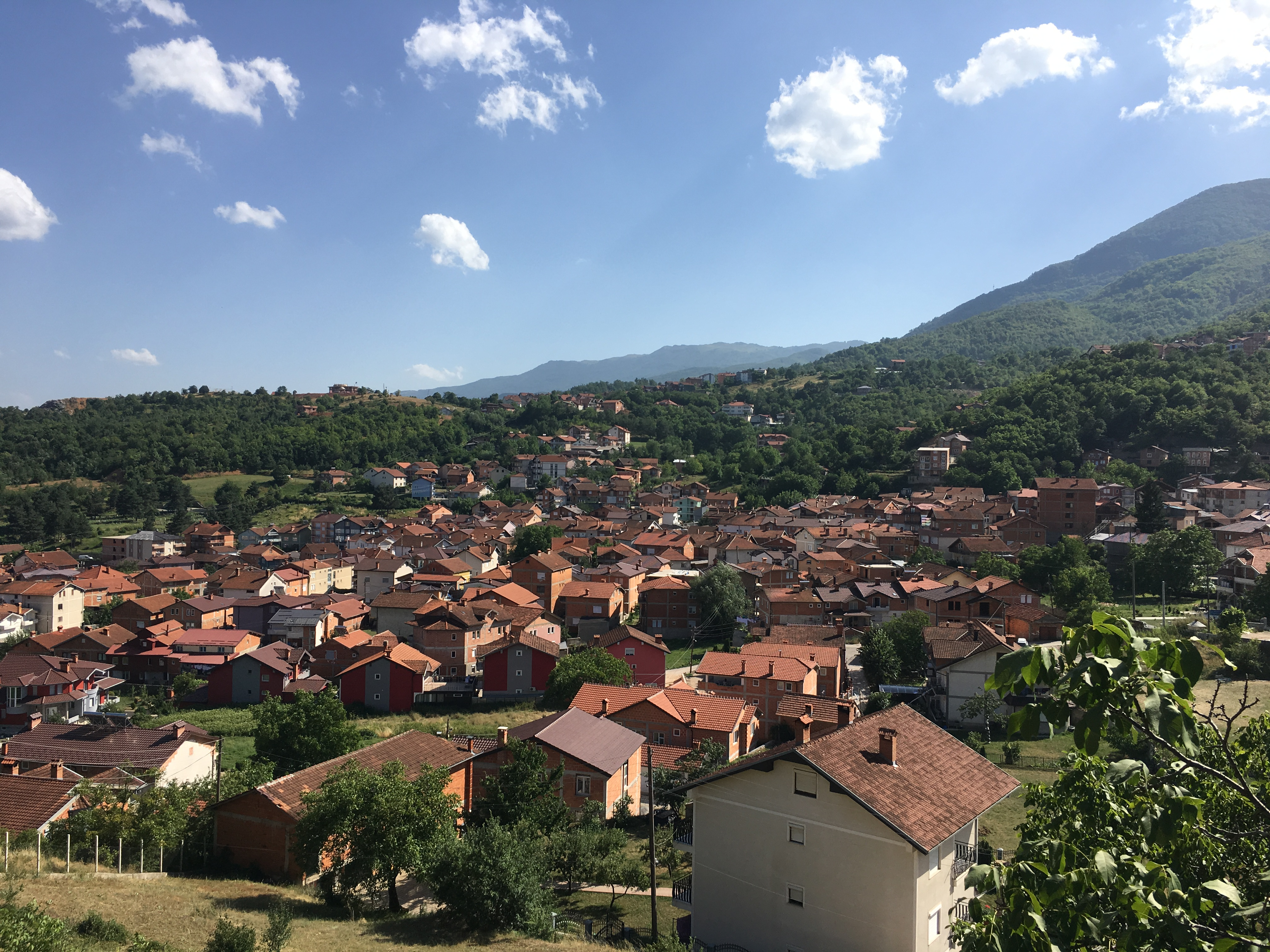
- Panoramic view of the village

- Location within North Macedonia
- Coordinates: 41°16′6″N 20°35′45″E
- Country: North Macedonia
- Region: Southwestern
- Municipality: Struga
- Elevation: 758 m (2,487 ft)

Population (2021)
  - Total: 6,740
- Time zone: UTC+1 (CET)
  - Summer (DST): UTC+2 (CEST)
- Postal code: 6336
- Area code: +389
- Car plates: SU
- Website: www.spektra.com.mk .

Labuništa (Macedonian: Лабуништа; Albanian: Llabunishta) is a village in the municipality of Struga, North Macedonia.

== Name ==
Labuništa is an old name dating back to the time of the arrival of Slavic peoples to the Balkans. The origins of the name Labuništa are Greco-Latin from the toponym Albanopolis. Pianka Włodzimierz connects the placename Labuništa with a south-western Balkans settlement of antiquity named Albanopolis, a city marked on an ancient map by Roman geographer Ptolemy. Through metathesis the name Albanopolis entered Slavic where the suffix polis meaning city became išta with dual meanings of either being a patronymic or indicating a place. While the form Alban, a name, underwent metathesis and became Labun in Slavic of which the syllable cluster an became un giving the final form as Labun(išta).

== Geography ==
The village of Labuništa is located at 865 m (2,838 ft) above sea level on the Eastern side of the Jablanica mountain range. The village is located around 15 km (9 mi) from Struga, the closest town. The nearest villages to Labuništa include Podgorci (1.1 km or 0.68 mi), Boroec (2.3 km or 1.4 mi), Vevčani (3.1 km or 1.9 mi) and Oktisi (4.1 km or 2.5 mi). The village is located close to the Black Drin river and the Globočica lake.

== Demographics ==
=== History ===
According to Vasil Kanchov's study of Macedonia in 1900, "Macedonia, Ethnography and Statistics", (Bulgarian: Македония. Етнография и статистика, romanized: Makedonija. Etnografija i statistika), counted the village as having 660 Bulgarian Christian and 800 Muslim (Torbeš) inhabitants.

According to the statistics of geographer Dimitri Mishev (D. M. Brancoff), the village had a total Christian population of 640 in 1905, consisting of 512 Serbomans Patriarchist Bulgarians and 128 Exarchist Bulgarians.

According to 1961 data by anthropologist Joel Halpern the village's population was composed of 2,345 Macedonian Muslims and 380 Christian Macedonians.

The population of the village in past censuses:

Year	Macedonians	Albanians	Turks	Others
1961	1,687	372	596	74
1971	2,397	865	297	52
1981	4,199	220	82	143
1994	1,228	1,799	1,816	1,058
2002	1,149	4,935	1,618	1,233
2021	108	4 751	836	452

=== Demographics today ===
According to the 2002 national census, 8,935 people live in the village. According to the 2002 census, in Labuništa lived:

- Albanians: 4,935
- Turks: 1,618
- Macedonians: 1,149
- Bosniaks: 72
- Vlachs: 8
- Roma: 3
- Serbs: 1
- other: 1,149

Regarding the mother tongue of the population, the following results were given:

- Macedonian: 4,872 or 82%
- Albanian: 925 or 15,5%
- Turkish: 78 or 1,31%
- Serbian: 3 or 0,05%
- other: 58 or 0,97%

=== Identity ===
Common language and origin with Macedonian Christians does not play a role for a majority of Torbeš regarding self identification which is based on common religion (Islam) that in Labuništa has led to self declarations of being Albanian.

== Sports ==
Local football club FK Labunishta plays in the Macedonian Second League (West Division).

== Notable people ==
- Nikola А. Anđelković, (1902 - 1944) - Serb Chetnik military commander in WW2
- Milisav Antonijević - Drimkolski (1913–2001), Serbian educator and writer
- Bashkim Bashkimi, (1964) - sociologist, first doctor of sciences
- Đorđe Cvetković-Drimkolski (1860–1905), Serbian Chetnik
- Cvetko Jovanović (1862–1938), Serbian entrepreneur and benefactor
- Stoyan Gyurchinov (d. 1927), Orthodox priest
- Emin Amzoski (born 2002 in Struga) is an Italian-Macedonian political activist. He serves as the provincial vice representative of the Five Star Movement in the Province of Gorizia and as the youth representative for the territorial group.
- Ilija Ilić (1879–1942), Serbian military
- Andjelko Krstić, (1871-1952) - writer and playwright
- Murat Labunishta (1912 - 1946) - poet, politician
- Menil Velioski, (2001) - folk singer
