= Ilija Šumenković =

Serbian cabinet minister and ambassador

Ilija Šumenković (Boroec, Ottoman Empire, 1881 – Mexico City, 8 October 1962) was a Serbian cabinet minister and ambassador.

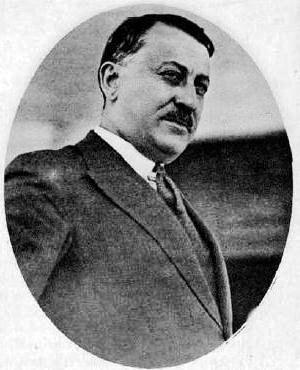
Ilija Šumenković

== Early life (until 1918) ==
Šumenković was born in the village of Boroec, close to Struga in present-day North Macedonia but at the time part of the Ottoman Empire. He came from a notable Serb family and his relative Kosta Šumenković has already made a career in Belgrade. Thus, Ilija also moved to Belgrade for his studies. As a student in 1905, he joined Serbian Chetniks. That same winter he made a journey to Macedonia to scout the situation and next year he joined the unit of Aksentije Bacetović („Baceta Rujanac“) and took part in battles as well as in national propaganda in Macedonia.

== Political career ==
During the regulation of the Yugoslav-Albanian border, Šumenković, already a prominent politician sent in 1919 a note to the commission dealing with that question in which he noted that if the border should remain as they had ordered it to be, then his native village of Boroec — as well as the village of Vevčani from which the forefathers of Mihailo Pupin came — would be in Albania. The note allegedly made the commission move the borderline to include this region into the Kingdom of Serbs, Croats, and Slovenes.

Šumenković was originally a member of the Democratic Party and later, from its founding in 1929, of Yugoslav National Party.

Among his duties he was also the Yugoslav representative in the League of Nations and the ambassador to Switzerland.

After some time as an MP for Democratic Party, in 1924 Šumenković became the Cabinet Minister of Trade and Industry. In 1927-1928 he was in charge of the Ministry of Construction. In 1928 he was the Minister for the Unification of Laws. In 1928-1929 he was a Minister without portfolio. In 1932 he was the Minister of Justice and in 1934 a Minister of Education. For a number of years Šumenković represented his Democratic Party in the Financial Committee.

From 1939 to 1945 he was the Yugoslav ambassador in Turkey. In 1943 he was one of the candidates for the post of prime minister in the exiled Yugoslav government.

== Emigration ==
After World War II Šumenković, moved to Great Britain. In 1960, together with young Stevan K. Pavlowitch, he co-authored the book on Vojislav Marinković. Next year his book Naša emigracija i spoljna politika ("Our Emigration and Foreign Policy") was published in Canada.

== Family ==
Ilija Šumenković had a brother, Radovan Šumenković, who was until 1941 Yugoslav general consul in Prague.
