= Boroec =

- Village
- Бороец; Borovec
- Location within North Macedonia
- Coordinates: 41°17′N 20°36′E
- Country: North Macedonia
- Region: Southwestern
- Municipality: Struga

Population (2002)
  - Total: 629
- Time zone: UTC+1 (CET)
  - Summer (DST): UTC+2 (CEST)
- Car plates: SU
- Website: .

Boroec (Macedonian: Бороец, Albanian: Borovec) is a village in the municipality of Struga, North Macedonia.

== Demographics ==
Boroec has traditionally been inhabited by Orthodox Christian Macedonians and a Torbeš population.

According to the 1943 Albanian census, Boroec was inhabited by 400 Muslim Albanians and 340 Orthodox Serbs.

According to the 2002 census, the village had a total of 629 inhabitants. Ethnic groups in the village include:

- Macedonians 193
- Turks 175
- Albanians 74
- Others 187

As of the 2021 census, Boroec had 565 residents with the following ethnic composition:

- Macedonians 47
- Turks 153
- Albanians 103
- Others 143
- Persons for whom data was taken from administrative sources 119

== Notable people ==
- Kosta Šumenković (1829–1905), Serbian military, born in Borovac.
- Ilija Šumenković, Serbian minister and ambassador, born in Borovac.
- Mateja Šumenković (1864–1939), Orthodox priest, born in Borovac.
