= Murat Labënishti =

Albanian revolutionary

Murat Labunishti (Albanian: Murat Labunishti, Murat Labënishti; Macedonian: Мурат Лабуништи) was an Albanian nationalist, member of the Balli Kombëtar organization from Labuništa.

== Life ==
He was born on August 14, 1909 (according to some sources, 1913) in the village of Labunishta in the Ottoman Empire. He completed his elementary education in Labunishta and his secondary education in Sarajevo, Kingdom of Yugoslavia. Along with his native Albanian language, he spoke French, Italian and Turkish fluently.

In 1935, the authorities of the Kingdom of Yugoslavia expelled Murat and his brother from the country, and they settled in Albania. There, he completed high school in Shkodra and worked in several publishing houses that published his works. From the end of 1939 until October 1943, he worked as a secretary at the prefecture in Peking.

After the defeat of the Kingdom of Yugoslavia in April 1941 and the annexation of Struga to Albania, Murat Labunishti returned to his native village. He was arrested by the Albanian police for his actions against the regime. In the fall of 1943, he became the mayor of Labunishta. On October 20, 1943, at a meeting of elders from Labunishta, Veleshtë, and Oktisi, Murat Labunishti was appointed as the organizer of Albanian militias in these villages. On December 25, 1943, in Labunishta, he formed the Albanian committee and the "Black Drin" militia, of which he became the commander. In mid-1944, he was elected the head of the "Rinia Shqiptare" (Albanian Youth) organization in Struga. He became a member of the high command of Balli Kombëtar and in October 1944, at the insistence of the head of the Second Prizren League for Struga, Mentor Koku, Murat Labunishti was appointed as the deputy governor of Struga.

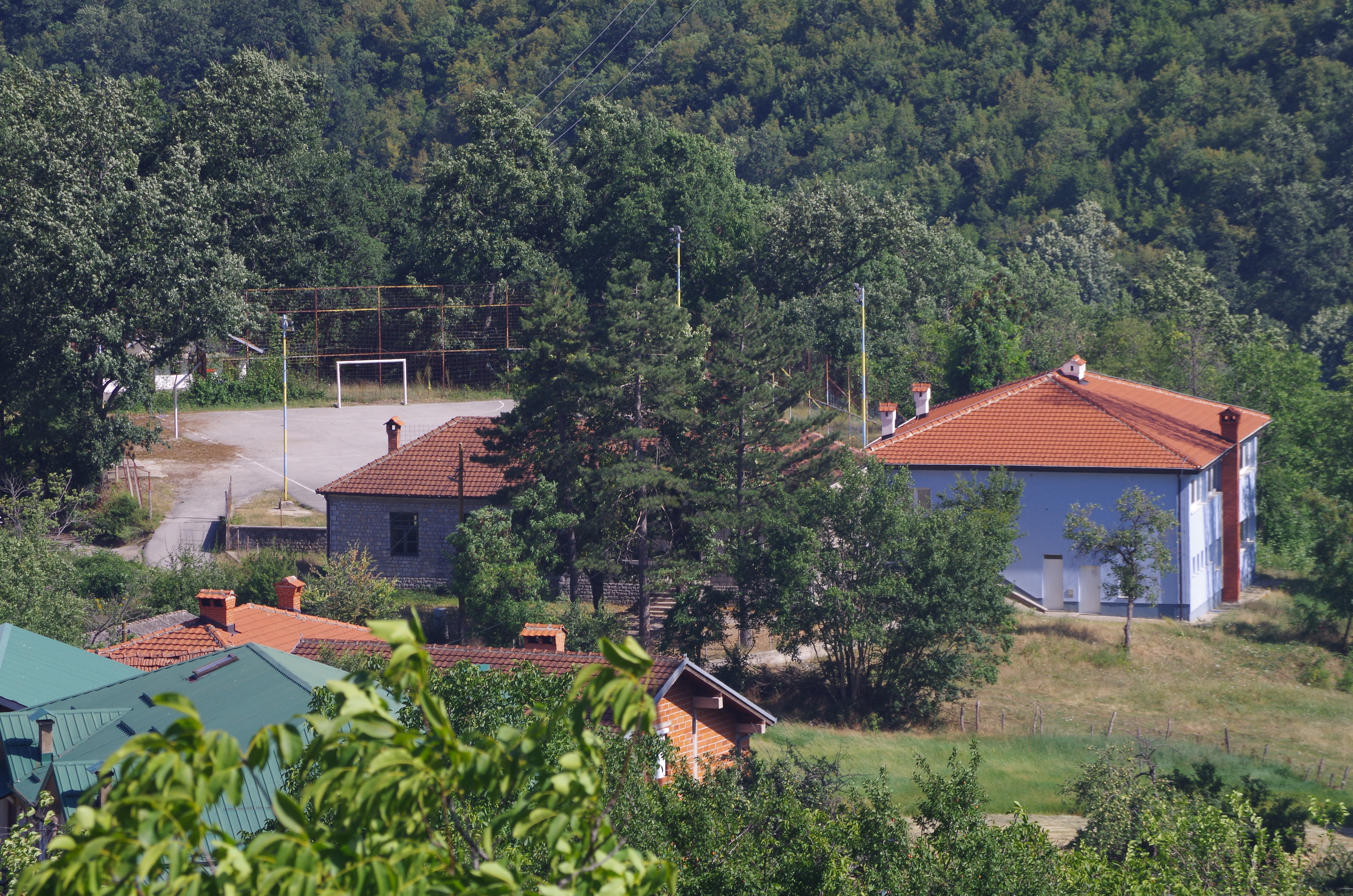
The regional Murat Labuništi Primary School in the village of Boroec

During the final stages of the liberation of Yugoslav Macedonia, the communist partisans entered Ohrid and Struga on November 7–8, 1944, Murat Labunishti fled to the mountains. In November, his units resisted several partisan brigades sent to disarm the Albanian population in the mountains above Labunishti and Velešta. Dozens of soldiers from the Fourth Macedonian Albanian Brigade began to desert and join Labunishti's forces. On the night of November 20–21, units of the Fifth Macedonian Brigade surrounded Labunishti, where the Albanian volunteer forces were stationed. After a brief battle, Murat Labunishti and 100 fighters fled from the village to Zerqan, where the headquarters of the communist Fourth Albanian Division, led by Mehmet Shehu, was located. Shehu handed them over to the Seventh Macedonian Brigade at the request of the chief of staff of the Macedonian communist units on December 5, 1944, who then sent them to the investigative prison in Struga on the orders of the State Security Administration. From there, Labunishti was transferred to the Idrizovo prison. He received a life sentence from a communist military court in Macedonia, and a few months later, the Belgrade court sentenced him to death. However, Labunishti managed to escape from prison after a few months and became an illegal settler in Mati and Lumë in Albania with other Albanian nationalists.

Murat Labunishti, together with Nazim Tateshi and Faik Dabovjani, committed some crimes against the Christian population of Drimkol region, including killings, burning, and stealing. All this was part of the strategy of the Ballists to ethnically cleanse then Albanian territory from its Slavic element. So Macedonian Slavs often decided to flee to the Bulgarian occupation zone.

He was killed in June 1946 by Albanian communist militia on the bridge near the village of Shupenzë, Dibër County. His name is carried by the Murat Labunishti Elementary School in his native village.
