= Macedonian numerals =

Macedonian numerals are words that are used in Macedonian for expressing quantity. The Macedonian numerals have three grammatical genders (masculine, feminine and neutral) and they can have articles. There are several types of numerals: cardinal numerals, ordinal numerals, collective numerals and multiplicative numerals.

== Cardinal numerals ==
The cardinal numerals in Macedonian are:

Symbol	Cardinal numeral (masc.)	Cardinal numeral (fem.)	Cardinal numeral (neu.)
0	нула (nula)		
1	еден (eden)	една (edna)	едно (edno)
2	два (dva)	две (dve)	
3	три (tri)		
4	четири (četiri)		
5	пет (pet)		
6	шест (šest)		
7	седум (sedum)		
8	осум (osum)		
9	девет (devet)		
10	десет (deset)		

The numerals from 10 - 20 are formed by adding the suffix -наесет (-naeset) to the basic numeral. The suffix -naeset comes from the Old Macedonian suffix -на десет (-na deset).

Symbol	Cardinal numeral
11	единаесет (edinaeset)
12	дванаесет (dvanaeset)
13	тринаесет (trinaeset)
14	четиринаесет (četirinaeset)
15	петнаесет (petnaeset)
16	шестнаесет (šestnaeset)
17	седумнаесет (sedumnaeset)
18	осумнаесет (osumnaeset)
19	деветнаесет (devetnaeset)

The numerals 20, 30, 40 and 60 are formed by adding the suffix -есет (-eset, from the Old Macedonian -десет/ -deset). The numerals 50, 70, 80 and 90 are formed by adding the old suffix -десет (-deset). Notice that when we form the number 60, we do not pronounce or write the last two letters of the basic number, шест (šest) > шеесет (šeeset). The same rule goes for the number 50, in other words, we do not pronounce or write the last letter of the basic number. These two rules are used for better and easier pronunciation.

Symbol	Cardinal numeral
20	дваесет (dvaeset)
30	триесет (trieset)
40	четириесет (četirieset)
50	педесет (pedeset)
60	шеесет (šeeset)
70	седумдесет (sedumdeset)
80	осумдесет (osumdeset)
90	деведесет (devedeset)

The numbers between the decimal numbers are formed on the following way: decimal number + и (and) + the basic number.

Symbol	Cardinal numeral (masc.)	Cardinal numeral (fem.)	Cardinal numeral (neu.)
21	дваесет и еден (dvaeset i eden)	дваесет и една (dvaeset i edna)	дваесет и едно (dvaeset i edno)
22	дваесет и два (dvaeset i dva)	дваесет и две (dvaeset i dve)	
23	дваесет и три (dvaeset i tri)		
24	дваесет и четири (dvaeset i četiri)		
25	дваесет и пет (dvaeset i pet)		
26	дваесет и шест (dvaeset i šest)		
27	дваесет и седум (dvaeset i sedum)		
28	дваесет и осум (dvaeset i osum)		
29	дваесет и девет (dvaeset i devet)		

On the same way are formed the rest of the numbers.

The numbers 100, 200 and 300 are formed by adding the word -сто (-sto) to the basic number. The numbers over 300 are formed by adding the suffix -стотини (-стотини) to the basic number.

Symbol	Cardinal numeral
100	сто (sto)
200	двесте (dveste)
300	триста (trista)
400	четиристотини (četiristotini)
500	петстотини (petstotini)
600	шестотини (šeststotini)
700	седумстотини (sedumstotini)
800	осумстотини (osumstotini)
900	деветстотини (devetstotini)
1 000	илјада (iljada)

The rest of the numbers are formed same as the numerals between the decimal numerals.

The decagonal numerals are formed by adding the word -илјада (-iljada) to the basic numeral. The numbers between the decagonal numbers are formed on the same way as the numbers between the decimal numbers.

Symbol	Cardinal numeral
1000	илјада (iljada)
2000	две илјади (dve iljadi)
3000	три илјади (tri iljadi)
4000	четири илјади (četiri iljadi)
5000	пет илјади (pet iljadi)
6000	шест илјади (šest iljadi)
7000	седум илјади (sedum iljadi)
8000	осум илјади (osum iljadi)
9000	девет илјади (devet iljadi)
10 000	десет илјади (deset iljadi)
etc...	

The millions and the numbers between the millions are formed on the same way as the decagonal numerals.

Symbol	Cardinal numeral
1 000 000	милион (milion)
2 000 000	два милиони (dva milioni)
3 000 000	три милиони (tri milioni)
4 000 000	четири милиони (četiri milioni)
5 000 000	пет милиони (pet milioni)
6 000 000	шест милиони (šest milioni)
7 000 000	седум милиони (sedum milioni)
8 000 000	осум милиони (osum milioni)
9 000 000	девет милиони (devet milioni)
10 000 000	десет милиони (deset milioni)
etc...	

The further numerals are милијарда / milijarda (billion), трилион / trilion (trillion) etc. and they are formed as the other Macedonian numerals.

=== Example ===
- 12 332 789 : дванаесет милиони триста триесет и две илјади седумстотини осумдесет и девет. (dvanaeset milioni trista trieset i dve iljadi sedumstotini osumdeset i devet)

== Ordinal numerals ==
The forming of the ordinal numerals depends on the gender of the numeral. To form the ordinal numerals we add -ti (m.), -ta (f.), -to (n.) to the basic numeral. Exception to this rule are the ordinal numerals first, second and third. If the basic word ends on the letter t and we add the suffixes for ordinal numerals, then a double t is generally produced. For the ordinal numerals seventh and eighth, we reduce some of the letters of the basic number, for example: osum > osmi (eighth), sedum > sedmi (seventh).

Symbol	Ordinal numeral (masc.)	Ordinal numeral (fem.)	Ordinal numeral (neu.)
0.	нулти (nulti)	нулта (nulta)	нулто (nulto)
1	прв (prv)	прва (prva)	прво (prvo)
2	втор (vtor)	втора (vtora)	второ (vtoro)
3	трет (tret)	трета (treta)	трето (treto)
4	четврти (četvrti)	четврта (četvrta)	четврто (četvrto)
5	петти (petti)	петта (petta)	петто (petto)
6	шести (šesti)	шеста (šesta)	шесто (šesto)
7	седми (sedmi)	седма (sedma)	седмо (sedmo)
8	осми (osmi)	осма (osma)	осмо (osmo)
9	деветти (devetti)	деветта (devetta)	деветто (devetto)
10	десетти (desetti)	десетта (desetta)	десетто (desetto)
etc...			
