= Anđelko Krstić =

Аnđelko Krstić
- Born: November 1, 1871; Labuništa
- Died: May 6, 1952; Labuništa

Anđelko Krstić (Serbian Cyrillic: Анђелко Крстић; Labuništa, near Struga, 1 November 1871 – Labuništa, near Struga, 6 May 1952) was a Serb writer and patriot. During the struggles to free Old Serbia and Macedonia from the Ottoman yoke, the Balkan Wars (1912–1913) and World War I, Krstić fought as a Chetnik voivode.

== Life ==
Krstić was born in the village of Labuništa in the Drimkol area (known as Mala Šumadija) north of Struga (present-day North Macedonia, then in Ottoman Empire) into a Serb family of pečalbari, whose work took them away from their homeland to earn for living but always kept close connections to their homeland.

His father, Martin, worked as a milkman in Belgrade and Anđelko joined him at a young age. Unhappy about this work, he wanted to get an education and enroll in an evening course in Saint Sava school for teachers. His father opposed his decision, took him back to native Labuništa and pressed him to marry, aged only 17.

However, Anđelko decided to oppose his father more resolutely when he wanted to take him to work with him in Romania. Instead, he returned to Belgrade and started working as a milkman assistant with his compatriot Marko Šumenković while in the evenings he attended school lessons. Professors soon noticed his diligence and helped him with a small stipend. He graduated in August 1889 with excellent grades. Despite an offer to stay in Belgrade Krstić decided to go back to his native village.

== World War I and After ==
Back in Old Serbia, despite many obstacles imposed by the Ottoman authorities and the Bulgarian Exarchate, he managed to open Serbian schools in the neighboring village of Podgorec and often collaborated with the Chetniks (members of the Serbian Chetnik Organization). He was arrested by Turkish authorities for his patriotic work several times. In 1911 he became the head principal of all the Serb schools in the areas of Debar, Struga, Štip and Ohrid.

Following October 1915 invasion of Serbia during World War I at the hands of German, Austro-Hungarian and Bulgarian armies, the Serbian army retreated through Albania, an event sometimes called the Albanian Golgotha. Kostić was among the lucky ones who survived and from Thessaloniki he participated in the Serbian army's offensive. Serbian and French forces retook limited areas of Macedonia by recapturing Bitola on 19 November 1916. They finally made a breakthrough; this breakthrough was significant in defeating Bulgaria and Austria-Hungary, which led to the final victory of World War I.

In 1924 he was offered by Bora Stanković a post in the Ministry of Education in Belgrade. Although he hesitated in 1940 he was appointed as an editor of Glas juga newspaper from Skopje, where he remained until the Nazi occupation in 1941. Krstić, modest as he was, spent the most of his life where he was born. He died in 1952 and was, by his own wish, buried on a hill underneath Mount Jablanica.

== Works ==
His first writing, descriptions of local customs, appeared in 1904 in Carigradski glasnik, a Serb newspaper printed in Constantinople. He wrote under the pen name Drimkolac (Drimkol is the name of the Struga area). His first short story saw the light of day in 1903 in the same newspaper. It was called Pečalba – the theme that will preoccupy his opus. Until 1914 he published ten stories but was little noticed in literary circles.

The breakthrough came in 1932 when a collection of his short stories was published in Belgrade. In the same year, he also published Trajan, a novel that includes many autobiographical elements. For both books, he received praise and won several literary awards.

He also wrote a drama Zatočnici (1937) that was performed in Skopje that same year, as well as another book of short stories published in 1951. An autobiographical book entitled Sećanja appeared in the year 2000.

His books are written in the dialect of his native Drimkol. In his style of writing Krstić was a strict realist.

== See also ==
- List of Chetnik voivodes
