= Menil Velioski =

Macedonian folk singer

- Born: April 26, 2001 (age 23); Labuništa, Macedonia
- Genres: Folk
- Occupation: Singer
- Instrument: Vocals

Menil Velioski (Macedonian: Менил Велиоски; born 26 April 2001) is a Macedonian folk singer. He became well known in the region of former Yugoslavia after participating in the show "Neki novi klinci", which was aired on the television channels Prva Srpska Televizija and Televizija OBN. "Neki novi klinci" is a TV show in which young singers under the age of 16 compete with each other and the winner receives two songs from the Serbian label Grand Production.

== Biography ==
Velioski was born in 2001 in Labuništa, a village in the southwestern region of the North Macedonia. Shortly after his birth, his family moved to Nova Gorica, Slovenia. Velioski is currently living and attending high school there.

Velioski started his musical career at the age of six, after his father bought him a keyboard. In the same interview, he said that his father is also a musician and has been his main inspiration. Velioski appeared in February 2016 in the show "Neki novi klinci" and his interpretations of the songs "Nisam te ponizio" by Šerif Konjević and "Dva galeba bela" by Šaban Šaulić caught the attention of many people in the region of former Yugoslavia, and the video of his performance has been watched over a million times on YouTube.

Velioski eventually made it to the final round of the competition. Instead of a jury, the public determined the winner this time. Velioski and his competitor Džejla Ramović were chosen as the two final candidates and Ramović won.

Shortly after the competition, Velioski started to build his career under the management of Sabit Saša Dervišević.

On November 25, 2016, Velioski released his first single called "Prava ljubav" ("True love") on YouTube. The video exceeded one million views on December 18, 2016.

His second single - called "Ja sam je samo voleo" - was released in September 2017. This was followed by the duet "Drama" with singer Tea Tairović in November 2017 and "Tron" in September 2018.
