= Risto Krle =

Macedonian playwright

Risto Krle Ристо Крле
- Born: September 3, 1900; Struga, Ottoman Empire (now North Macedonia)
- Died: October 29, 1975 (aged 75); Skopje, SFR Yugoslavia
- Occupation: Playwright
- Writing career
- Genre: Drama

Risto Krle (Macedonian: Ристо Крле, pronounced [ri'stɔ kr̩'le]; September 3, 1900 – October 29, 1975) (born in Struga, present-day North Macedonia during the Ottoman Empire) was a Macedonian playwright and the son of a shoe maker. Many interruptions made his schooling difficult. As a teenager he enrolled in the army where he served until he inherited his father's profession and succeeded as a shoe maker. Many of his plays were written throughout the Second World War and are set preceding or during the First and Second Balkan Wars.

== Works ==
- Money is Death (1938) (Macedonian: Парите се Отепувачка, transliterated Parite Se Otepuvačka)
- Millions of Martyrs (1940) (Милиони Маченици, Milioni Mačenici)
- Antica (1940) (Антица)
- Easter (1950) (Великден, Velikden)
- Count Milivoj (1958) (Гроф Миливој, Grof Milivoj)
- Autobiography (1990) (Автобиографија, Avtobiografija)
