= Kosta Šumenković =

Serbian businessman

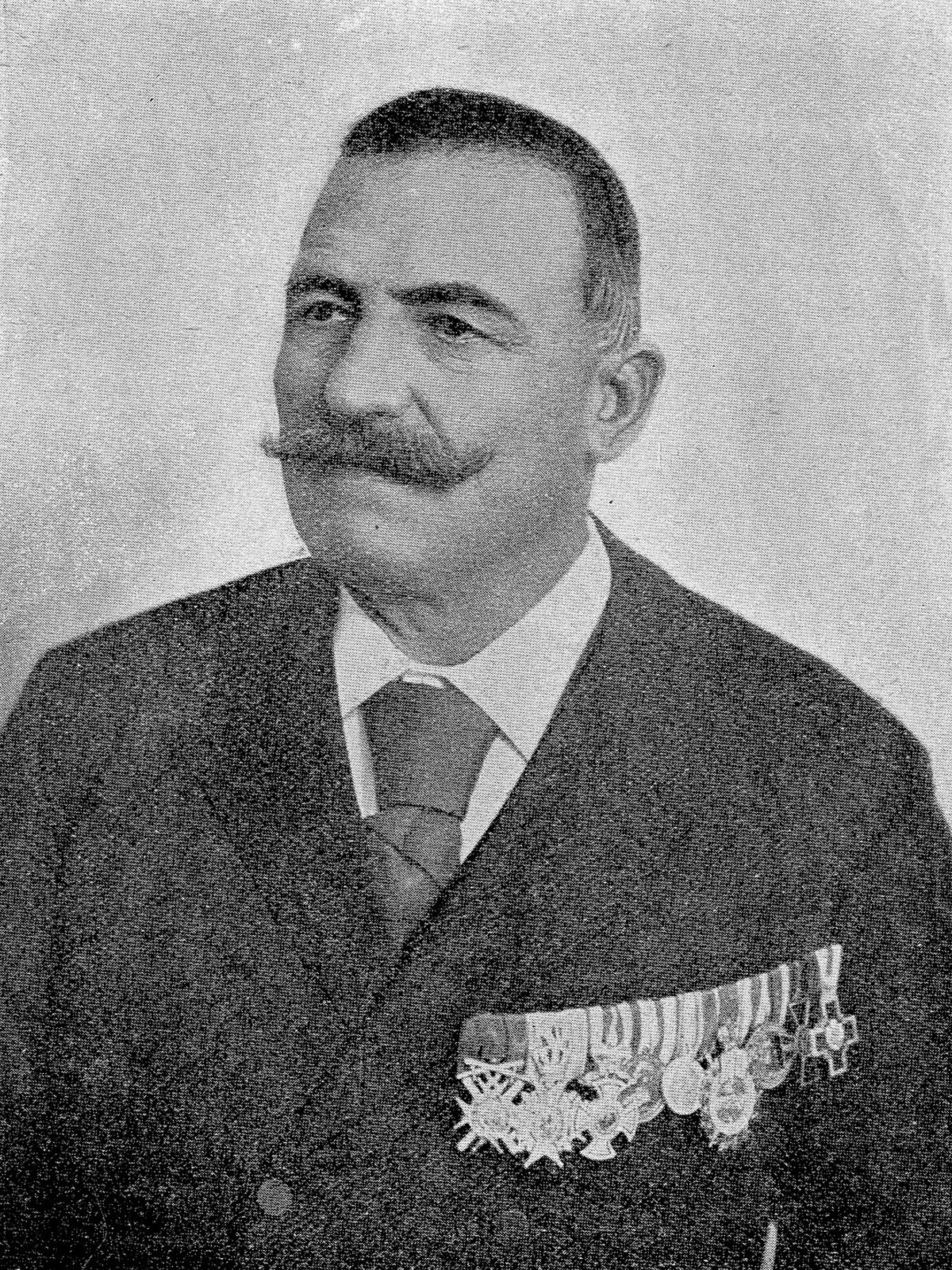

Kosta Šumenković (Serbian: Коста Шуменковић; 1829–1905), was a Serbian activist, a merchant by trade, who notably founded the Society of St. Sava with Svetomir Nikolajević. He was a veteran of the Serbian–Ottoman Wars (1876–1878) and the Serbian-Bulgarian War, and was the recipient of numerous medals and orders.

== Biography ==
Kosta Šumenković was born on 16 November 1829 in the village of Borovac (now Boroec) in the Drimkol region, in the Struga nahiya of the Ohrid kaza. His parents were Atanasije and Jana. His paternal great-grandfather was the famed local hajduk Nedeljko, known as "Šumin" (from šuma, "woods"), hence the surname Šumenkovic. The area was subject to frequent Arnaut (Muslim Albanian) cattle thieves coming from the other side of the Jablanica mountain, which Nedeljko stopped.

Kosta grew up listening to Serbian epic poetry and did not attend school. With the outbreak of the Crimean War (1853–56), he went to Belgrade where he opened a boza business that he continued in Russia, Germany and Austria for some years. Upon his return to Belgrade, he invested the money he earned and opened a shop with his partner Mihajlo Kostić "Albanez". He then set up his own shop, under his own name, at the Balkan Inn in Terazije. After the events at the Čukur Fountain in 1862, he participated with the volunteers in the siege of the Belgrade fortress and from there he befriended Miloš Milojević. Upon Milojević's return from education in Russia, they became great friends. He became a godfather to Milojević, who died in his arms. Kosta's wife Petka is responsible for Milojević recording many old folk songs from Old Serbia.

He soon made a considerable fortune, and as early as 1869 he built a Serbian school in his native village, where the teacher Stanko Lazarević began to work. In June–October 1871 Milojević and Šumenković secretly travelled in Old Serbia and Macedonia.

In 1873, he published a map of Miloš Milojević at his own expense: "Historical-ethnographic geographical map of Serbs and Serbian countries in Turkey and Austria." In 1876, he protested together with Todor Stanković from Niš, Despot Badžović from Kruševo before the Constantinople conference over the decision to include Old Serbia in future Bulgaria.

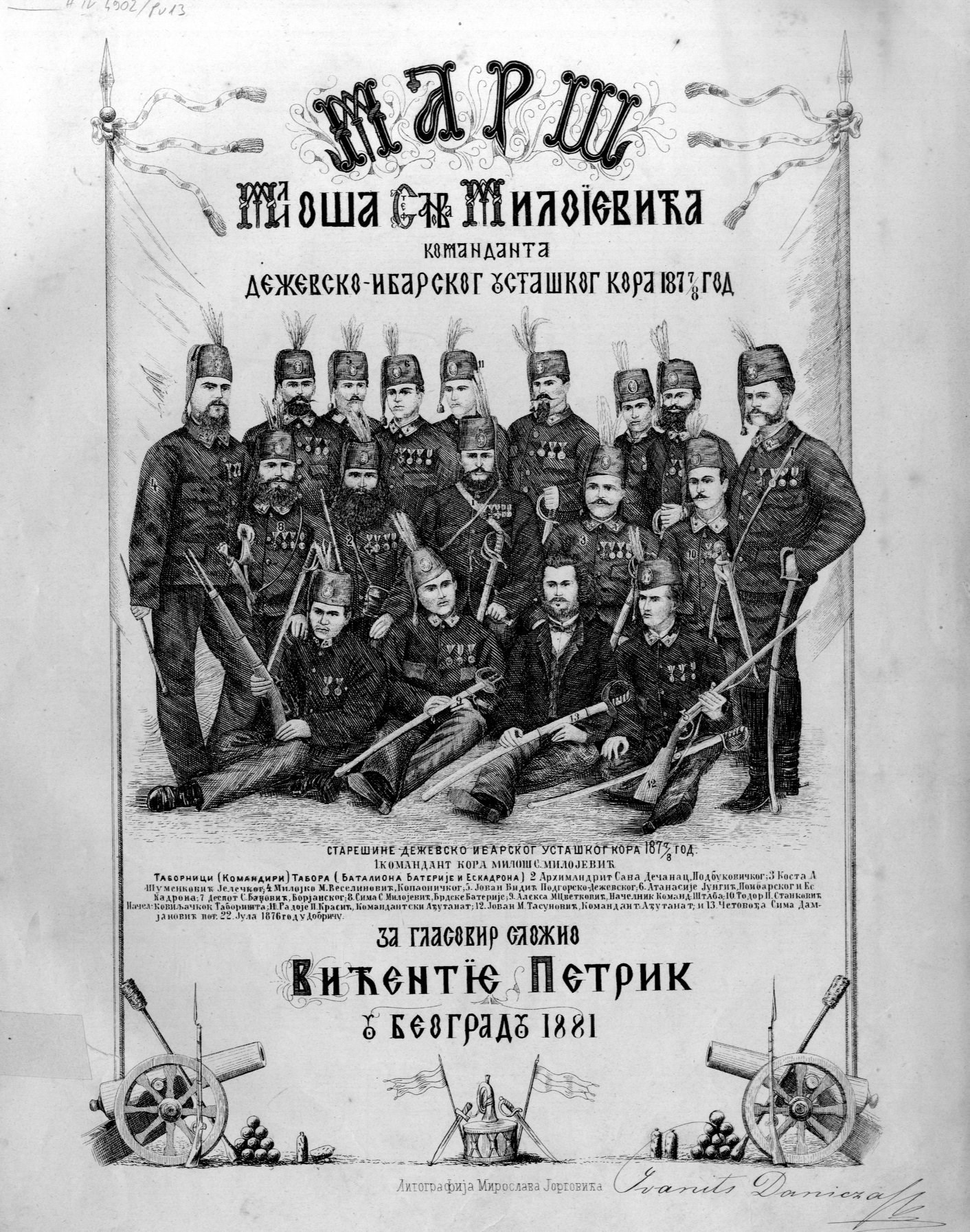
March for Miloš S. Milojević (1881), where Šumenković and his comrades in the Deževo-Ibar corps are illustrated based on a 1876 photograph.

Šumenković joined Milojević's volunteer corps in the Serbian-Turkish war in 1876, and had gathered around 150 volunteers, mostly from the nahiye of Ohrid and Debar, to join Milojević's battalion, made up of mostly people from Old Serbia and Macedonia. He distinguished himself with courage in the battles outside Novi Pazar. In the Second Serbian–Ottoman War of 1877–78 he operated a secret committee in Niš with Todor Stanković, Miloš Milojević, archimandrite Sava Dečanac, Aksentije Hadžiarsić, Despot Badžović and Gligorije Čemerikić with the aim of facilitating the breakthrough of the Serbian army there. In this war, he entered Vranje with the volunteers. He also participated in the Serbian-Bulgarian war in 1885 as a volunteer.

He was one of the founding members of the Society of Saint Sava in 1886. He became a regular member and a member of the charity "Society for the Aid of Workers from Old Serbia and Macedonia", in 1899 in Belgrade. He died in Belgrade in 1905 at the age of seventy-six.

== Awards and decorations ==
Kosta Šumenković was awarded:

- Order of the Cross of Takovo with swords, fifth-degree;
- Order of the Cross of Takovo, fourth degree;
- Order of St. Sava, fifth-degree;
- Silver Medal for Bravery (Kingdom of Serbia;
- Golden Medal for Bravery (Kingdom of Serbia;
- Order of St. Sava (est. 1883), fourth-degree;
- Order of the Karađorđe's Star;
- Society of the Red Cross of Serbia's awards and decorations;
- Nikola Petrović awarded him the Order of Prince Danilo I, fourth degree;
- Order of Saint Peter of Cetinje;
- Order of Petrović Njegoš.

== War monuments ==
He was decorated by the Red Cross Society with his cross From the Society of Saint Sava with his medal. He was decorated by the Montenegrin prince Nikola Petrović with Danilo's cross of the fourth degree.

== Sources ==
- Odavić, Rista J., ed. (16 January 1900), "Један родољуб: Коста Шуменковић", Нова искра (1), Belgrade: Državna štamparija: 25-
- Браство (1940), "Браство", Браство, ?, Belgrade
- Rakić, Hranislav, ed. (1984). "Коста Шуменковић" (PDF). Лесковачки зборник. 24: 5–174.
- Vojvodić, Vaso (1994). U duhu Garašaninovih ideja: Srbija i neoslobođeno Srpstvo: 1868-1876. Prosveta. ISBN 978-86-07-00765-3.
