= St. Nicholas Church, Vevčani =

St. Nicholas Church
- Црква „Св. Никола“
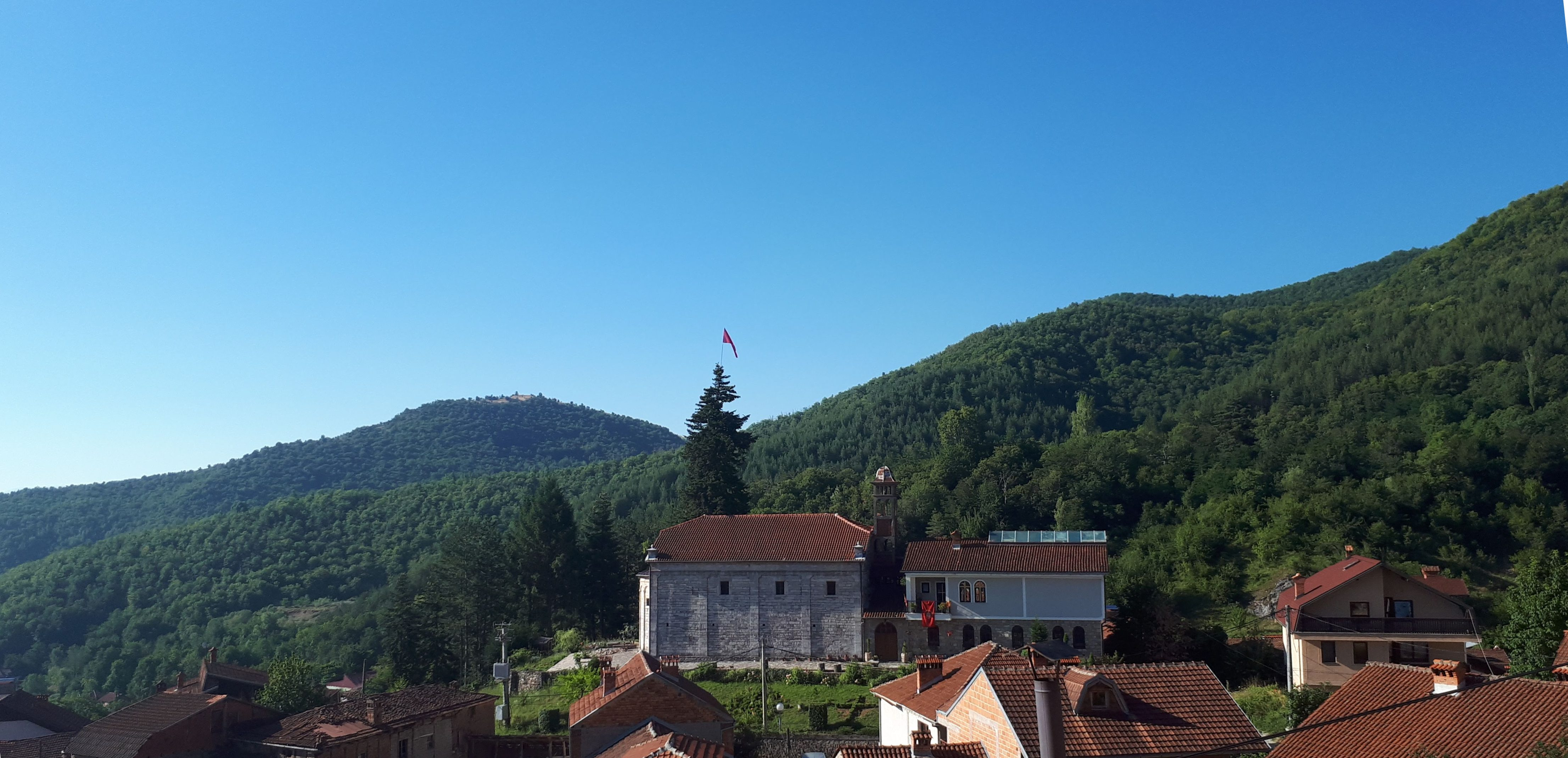
- The church in 2018
- St. Nicholas Church
- 41.239444°N 20.59°E
- Country: North Macedonia
- Denomination: Eastern Orthodox; Macedonian Orthodox Church
- Website: www.dke.org.mk

History
- Dedication: Saint Nicholas
- Consecrated: 1876

Architecture
- Functional status: yes
- Years built: 3
- Groundbreaking: 1922
- Completed: 1925

Administration
- Diocese: Debar and Kičevo Diocese
- Parish: Vevčani Parish

The St. Nicholas Church is a Macedonian Orthodox parish church in the village of Vevčani.

== History ==
The construction or maybe the reconstruction of this church started in 1834. The construction of the church was completed in 1864.

== Architecture ==
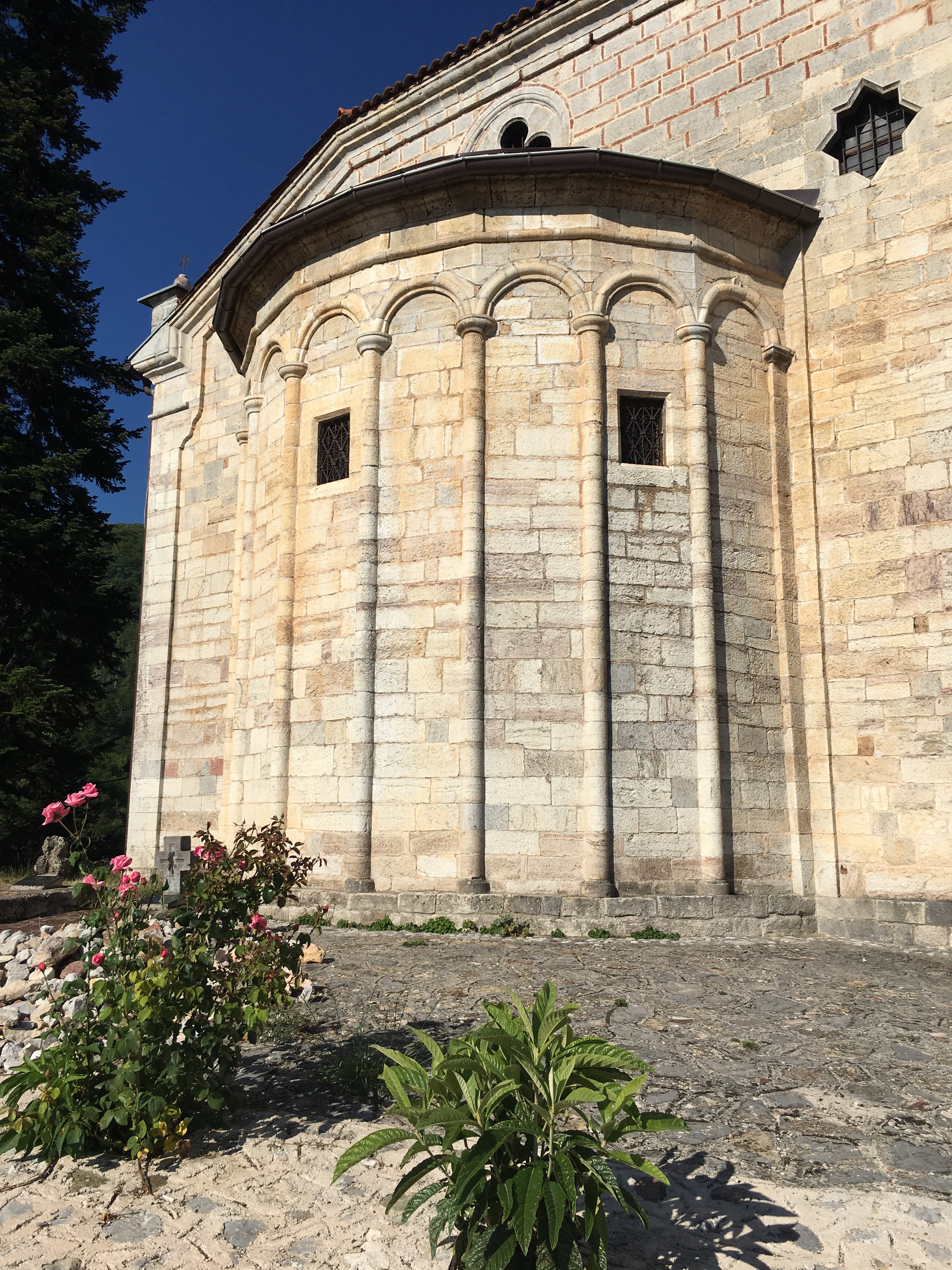
The apse of the church.

The church is a three-naved basilica with an altar and balcony. The church is 18 meters long and 12.5 meters wide.

It was built with a flat floor, which was not allowed by the Ottoman rule at the time. The church is built of hand-hewn stone, and the entrance door is walled with tin. Above it, as above the other openings, biblical symbols are carved into the stone. The stone was taken from Maidan, in the mountain above Vevčani, and was carried by oxen.

=== Fresco painting ===
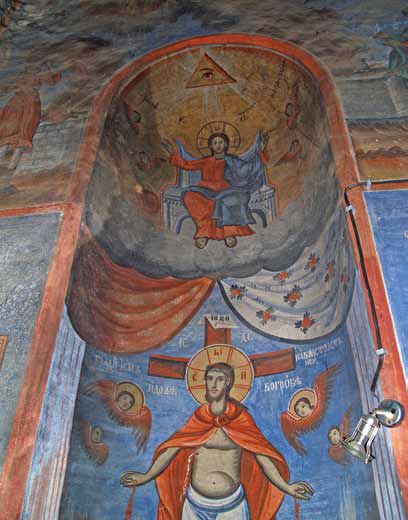
A fresco by Avram Dičov.

The fresco painting is the work of Avram Dičov, the eldest son of Dičo Zograf from the village of Tresonče, and it was worked on at the same time to be finished in 1879. The church with imposing dimensions, built with imagination and richly painted, is one of the most beautiful Macedonian revival monuments in North Macedonia.

=== Iconostasis ===
The icons in the church were made by Dičo Zograf, a Miyak painter whose first icon for the church was probably made in 1849. The throne icons were also made by Dičo in 1876, which is considered the year of the church's consecration.

== Gallery ==
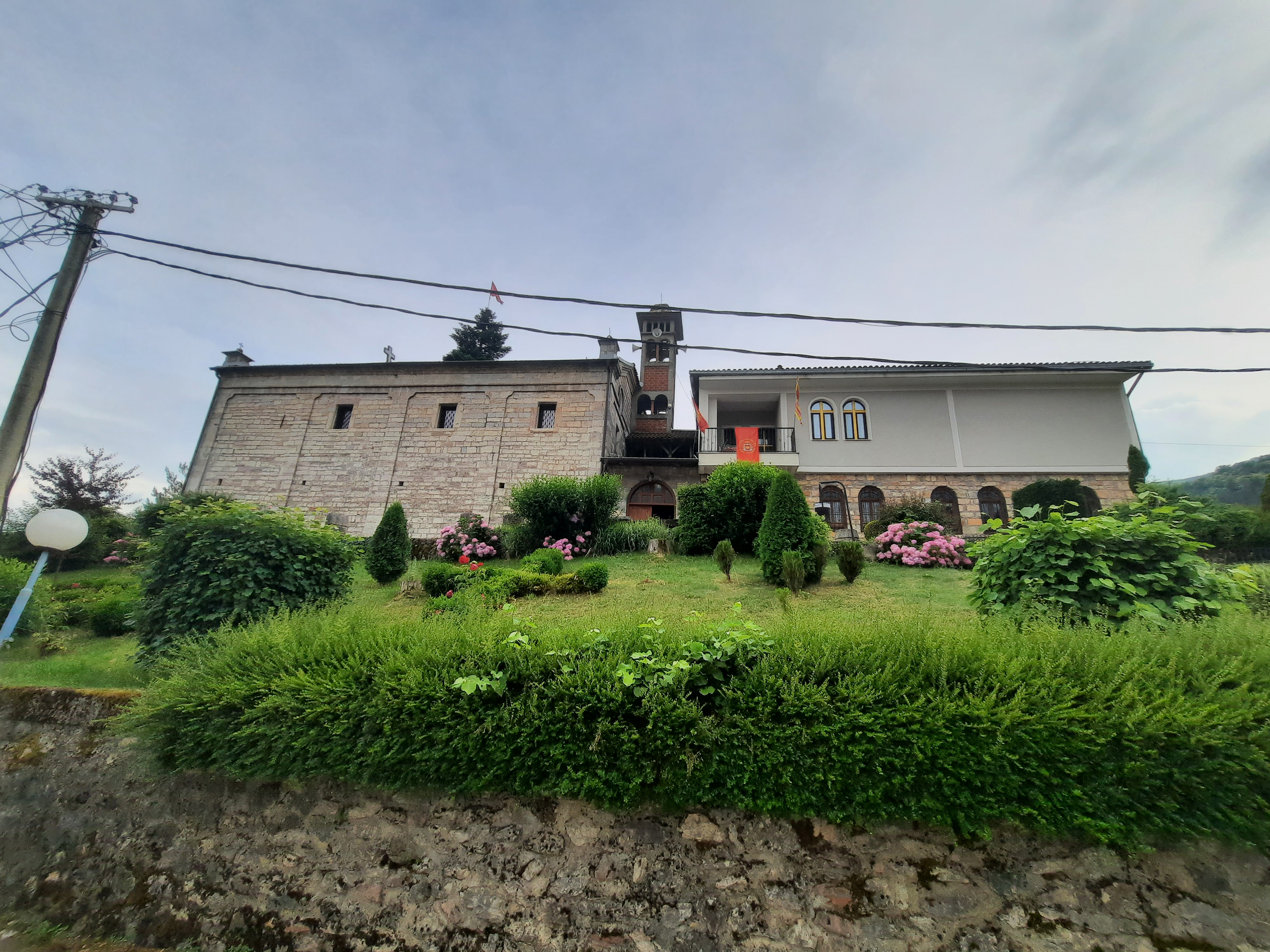

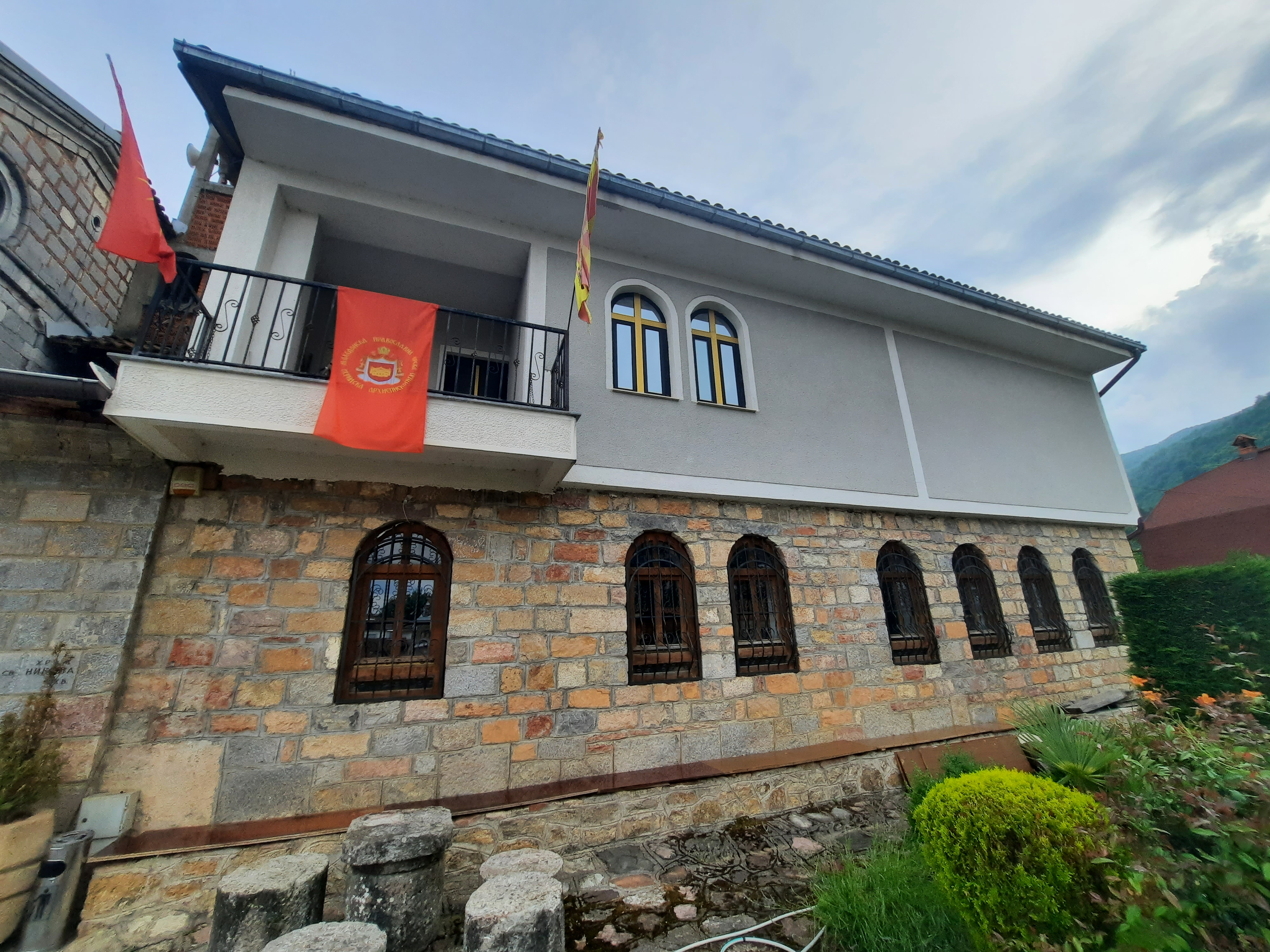

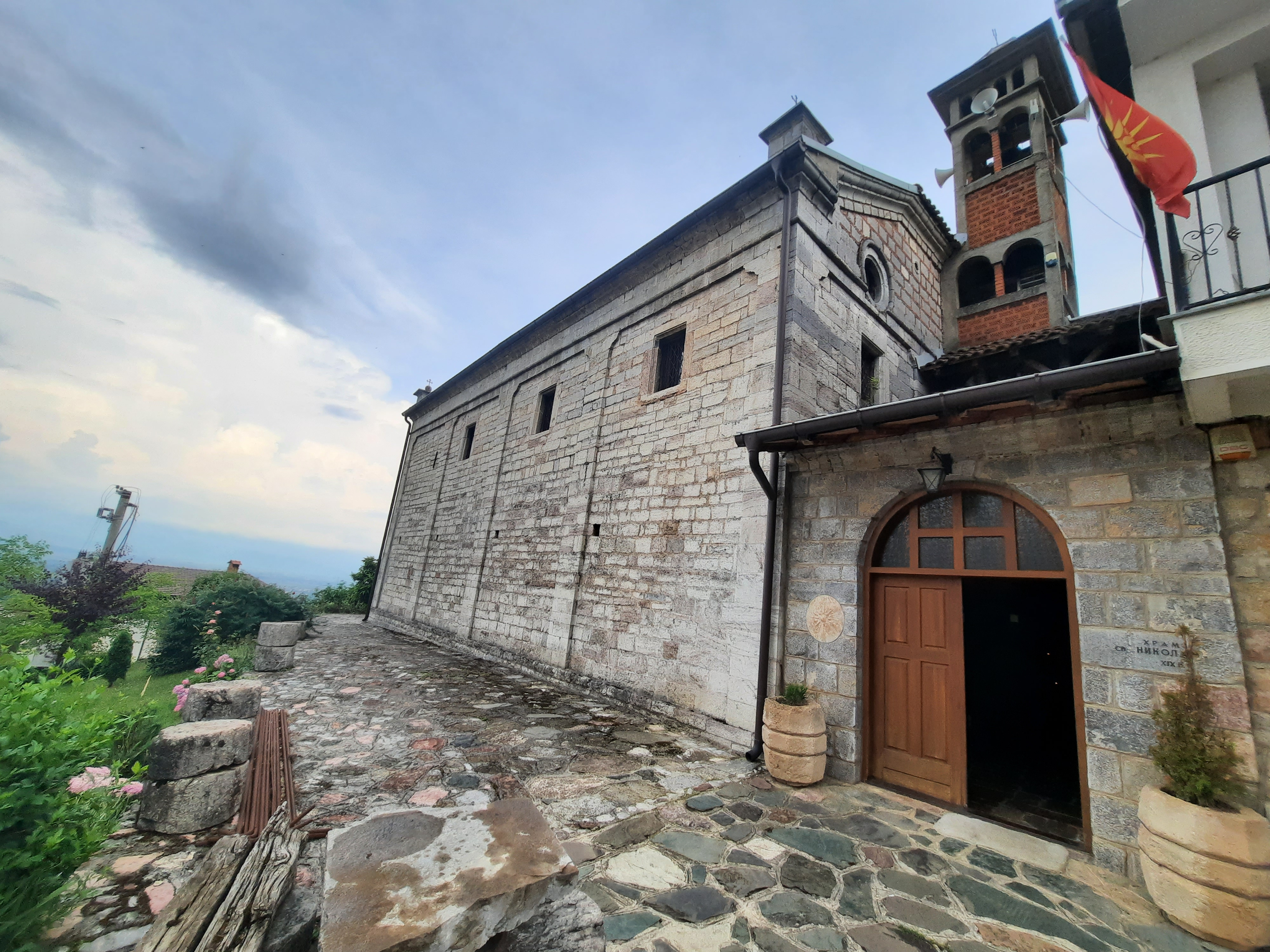

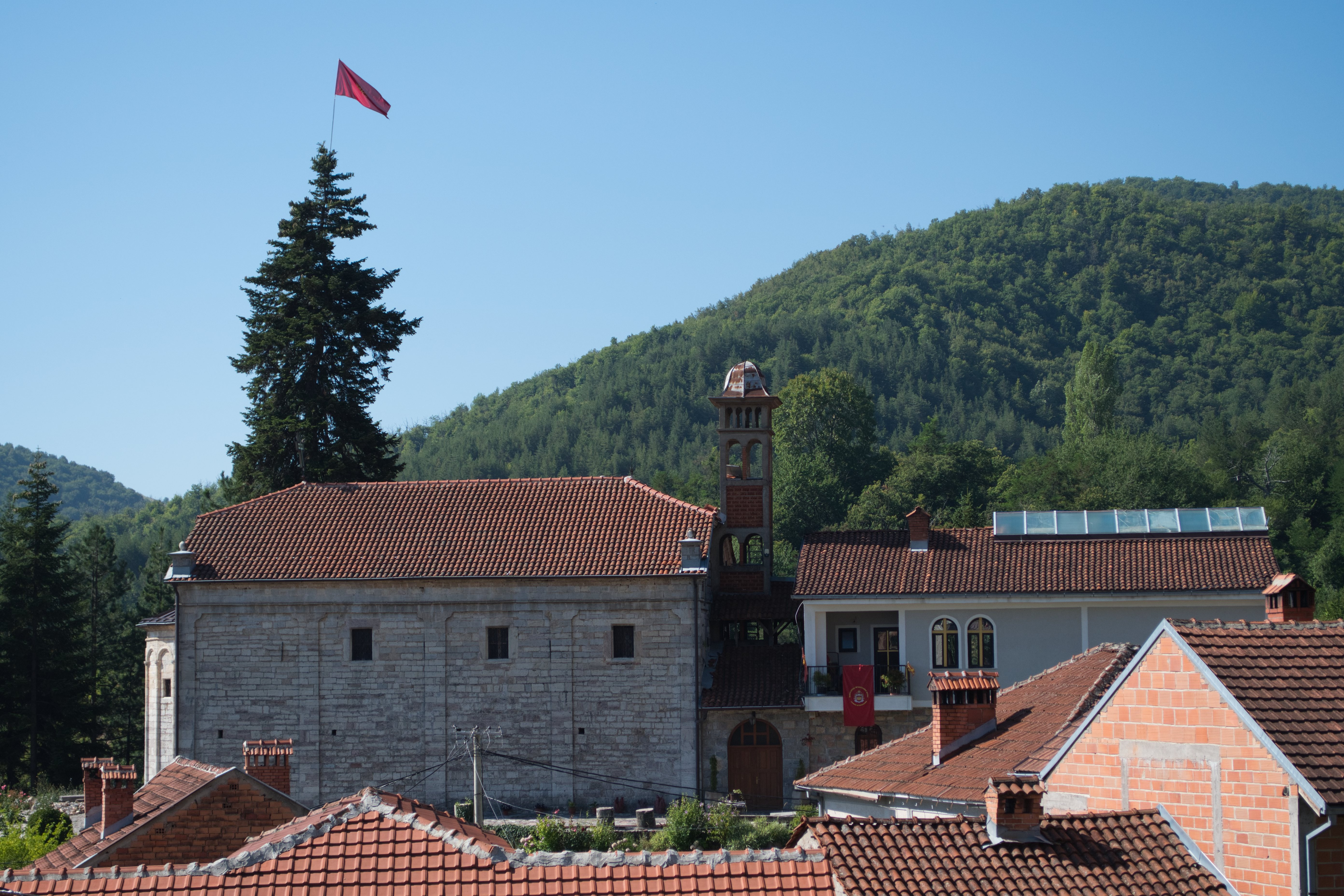
View of the church

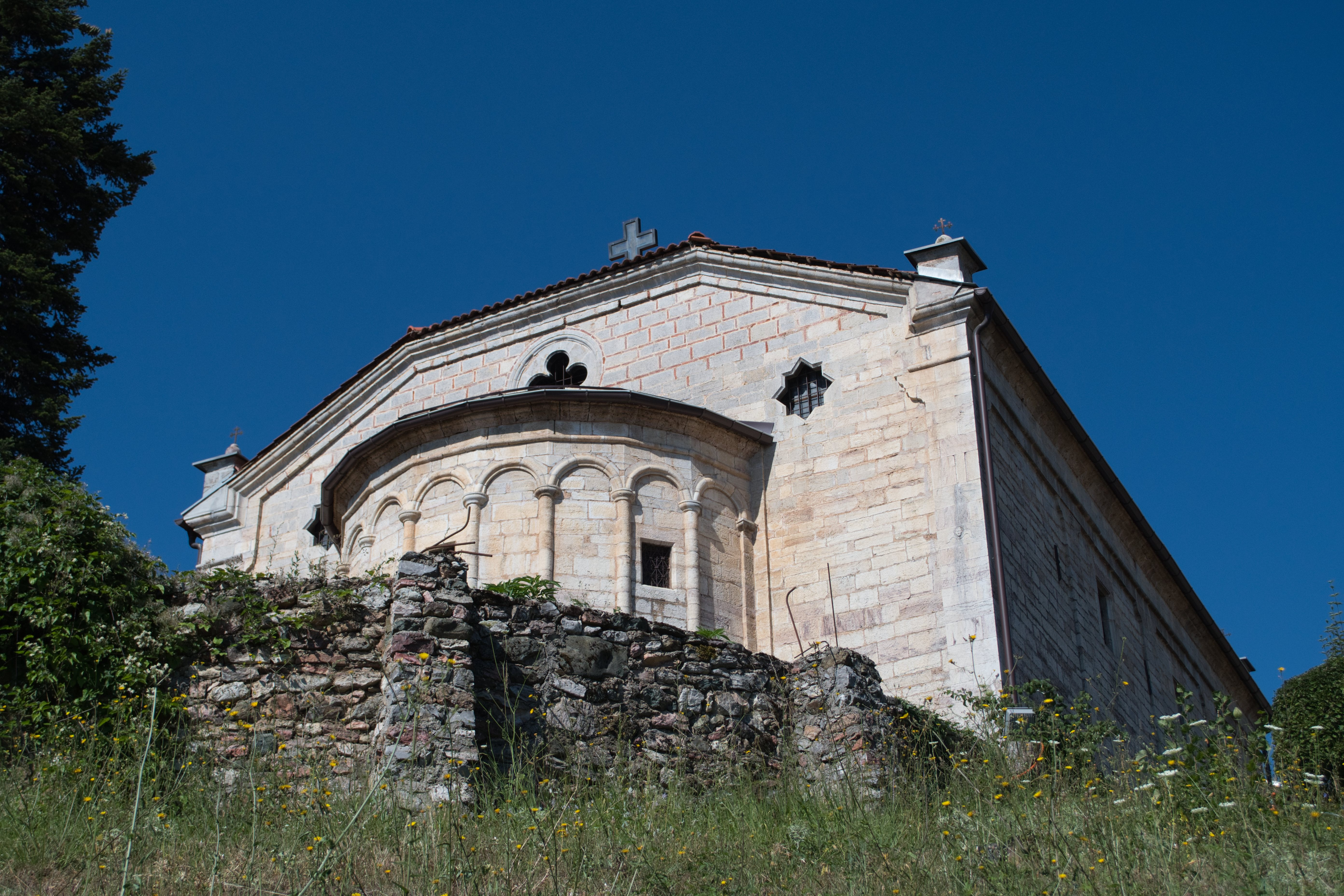
View of the church

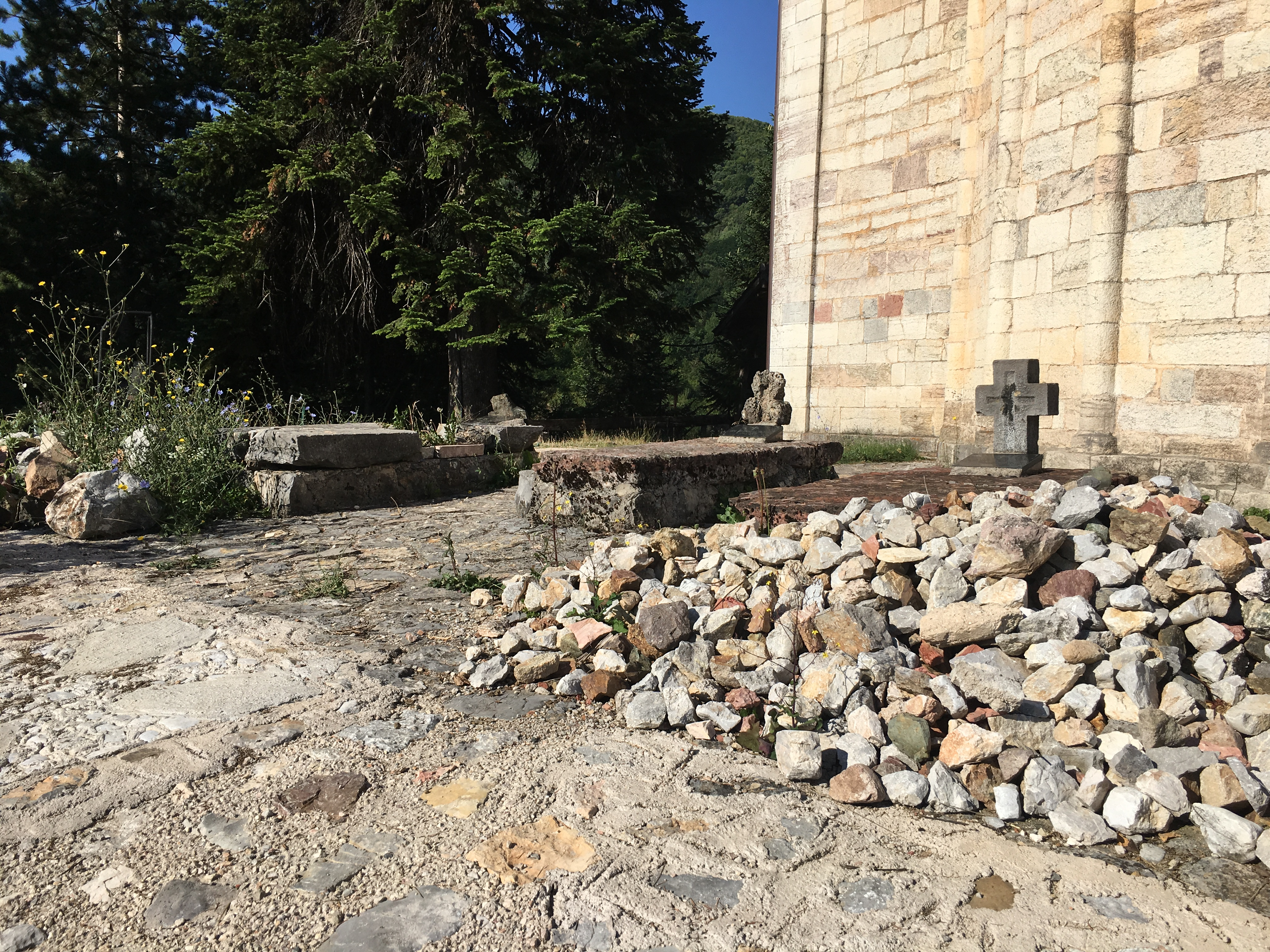
Graves in the yard

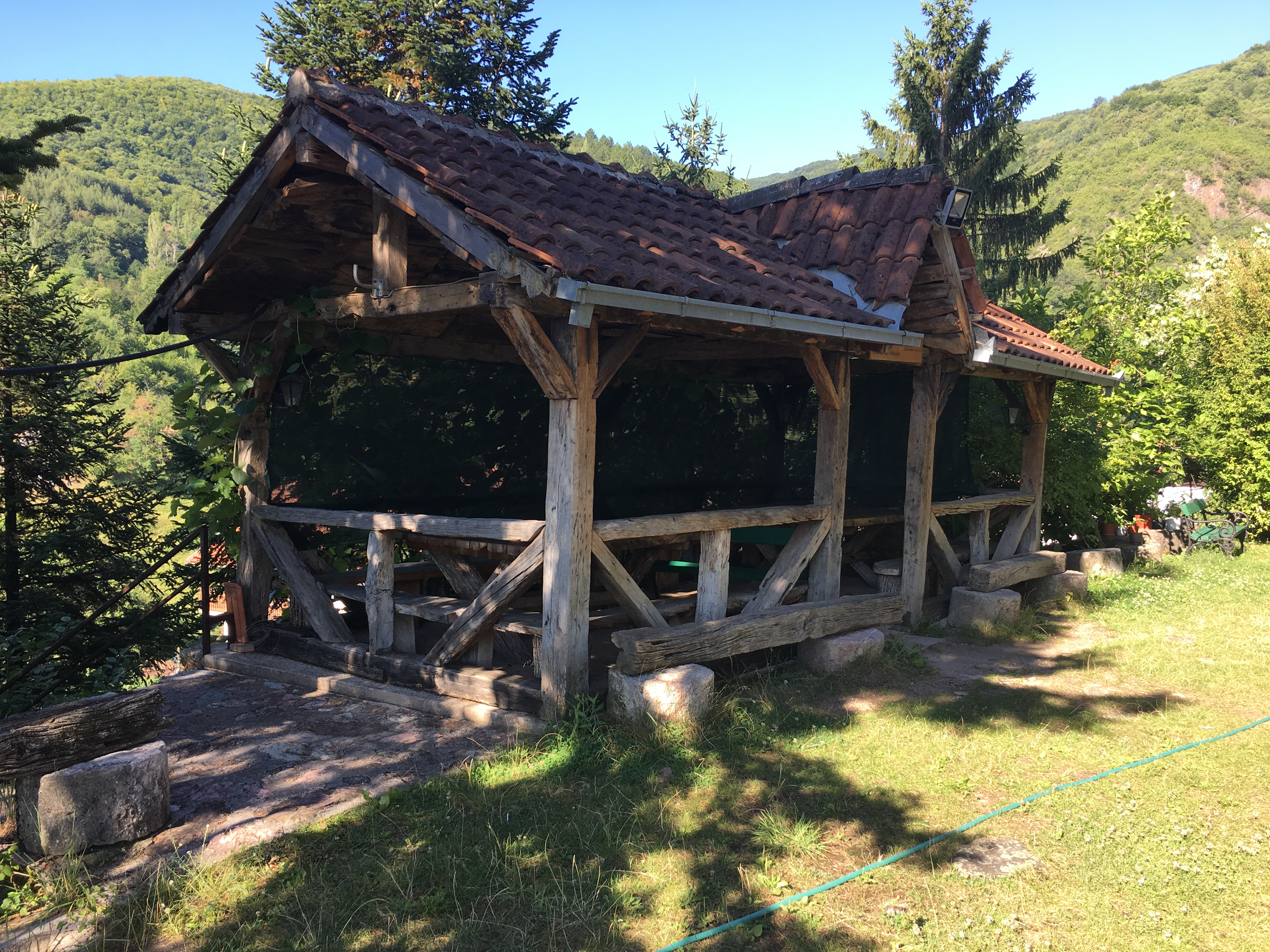
An adjacent building to the church

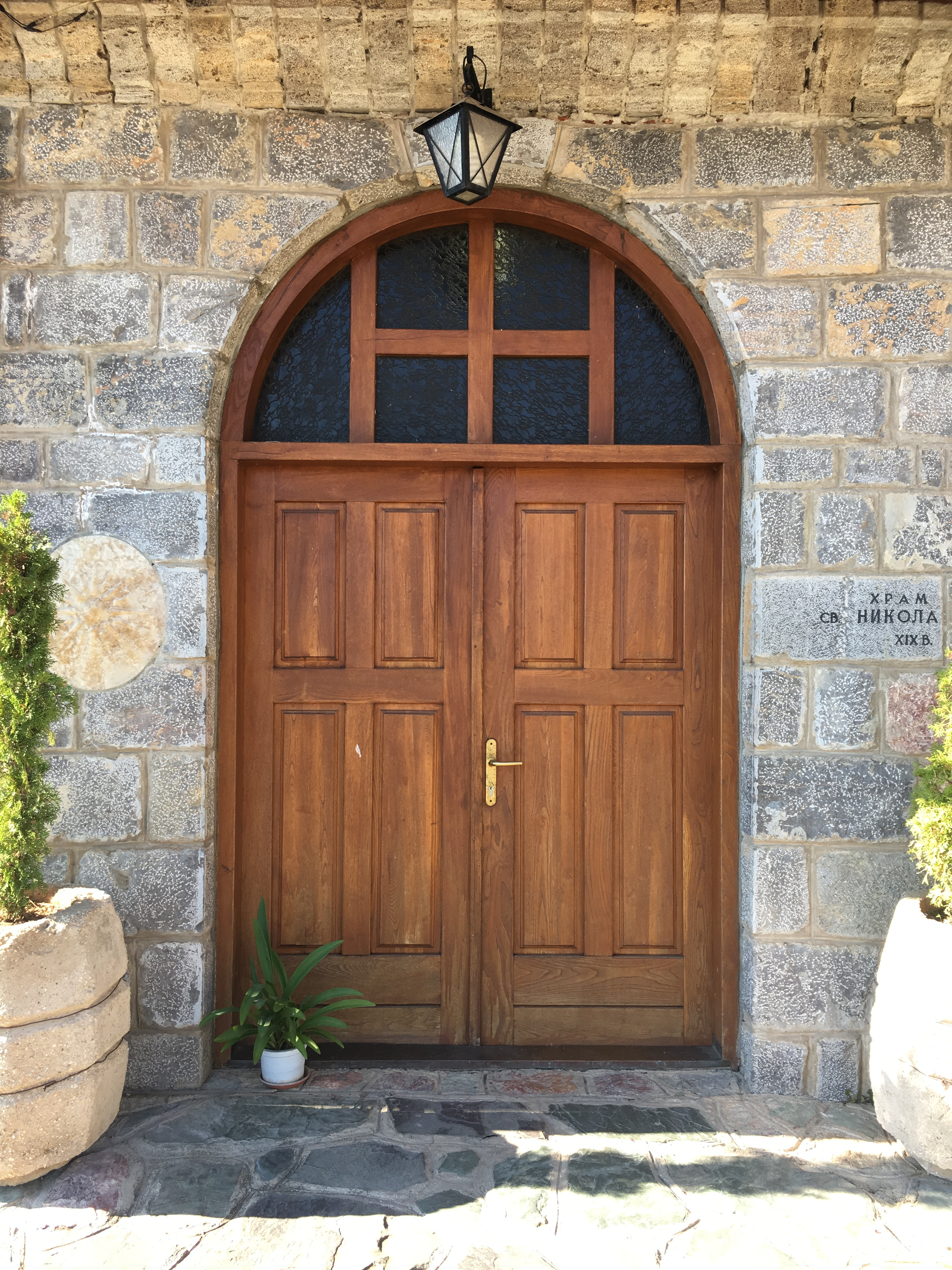
The main entrance

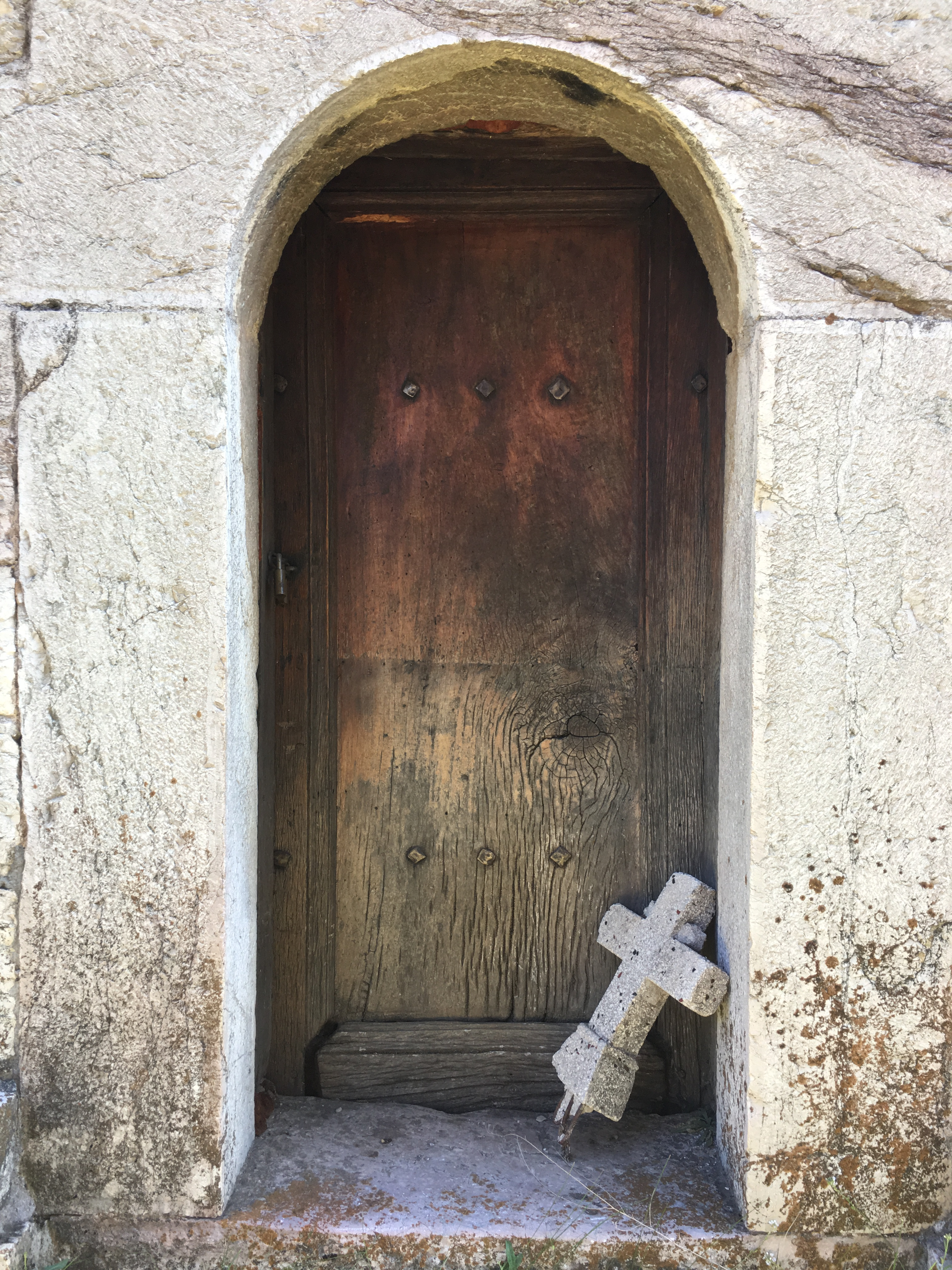
A secondary entrance

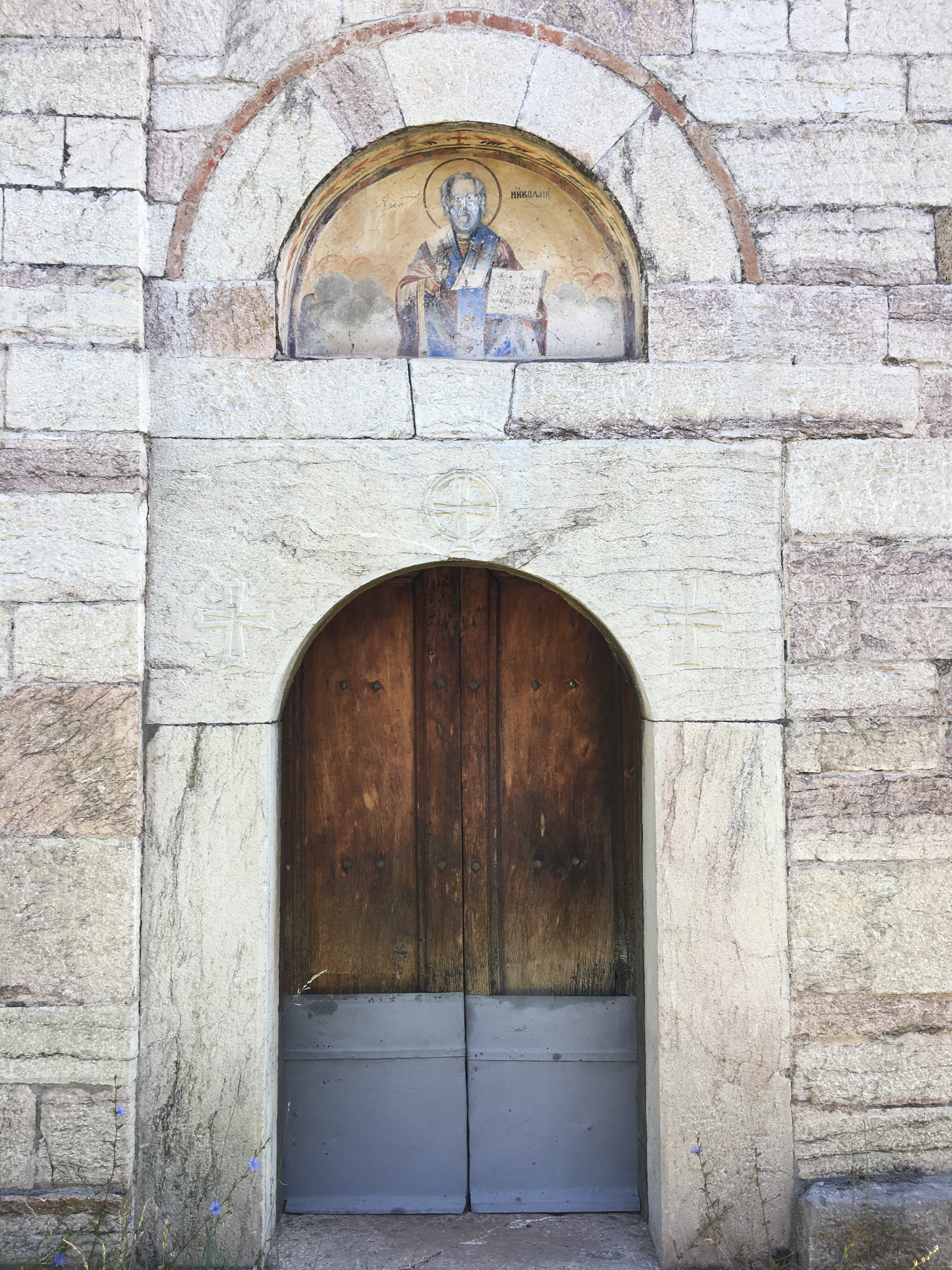
A secondary entrance

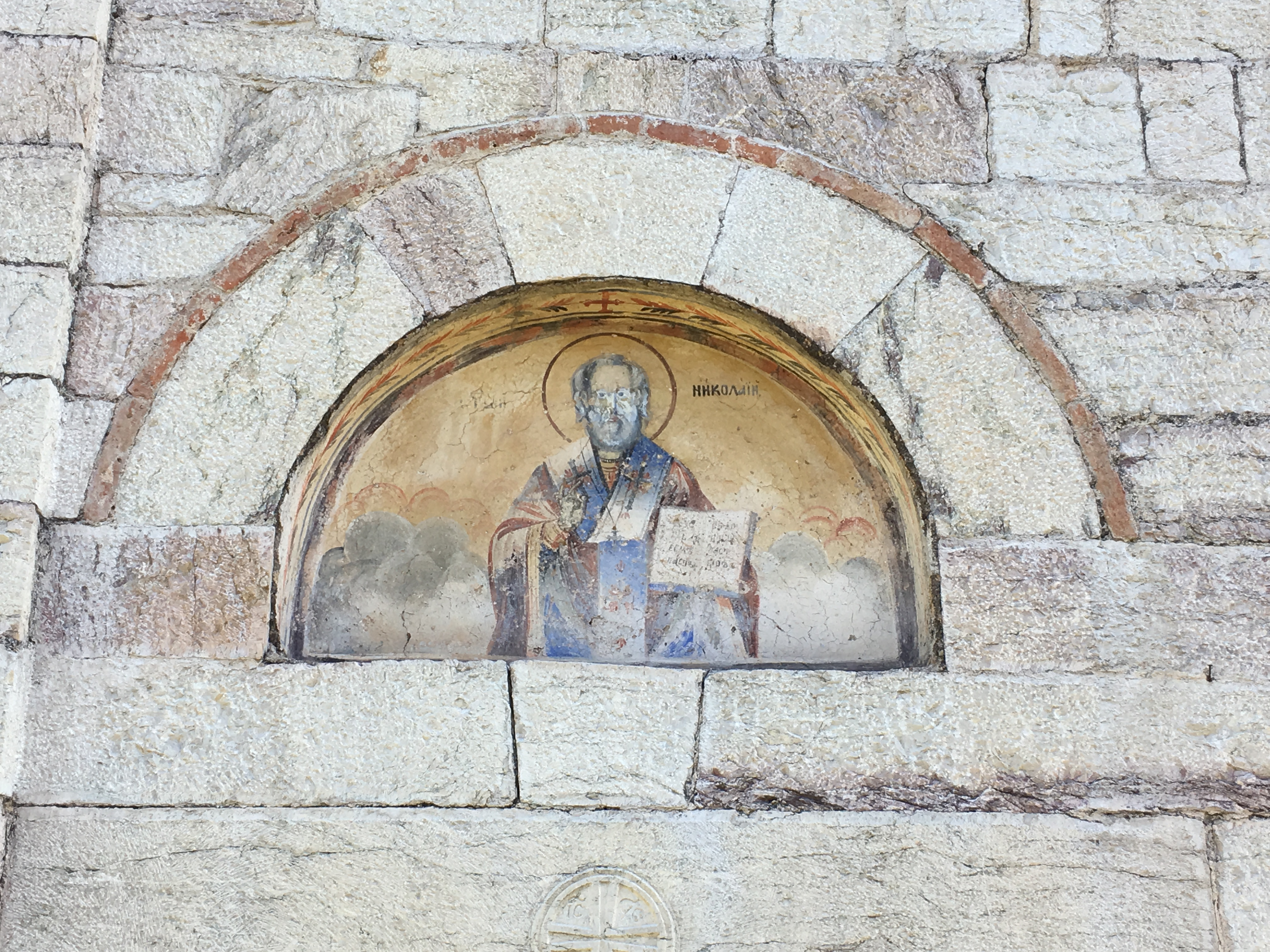
A fresco above the secondary entrance

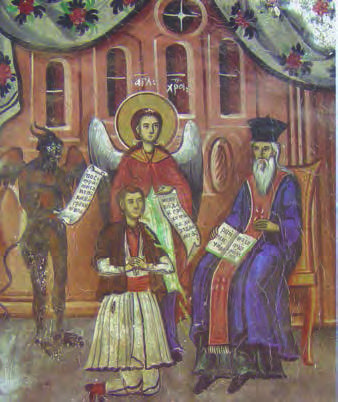

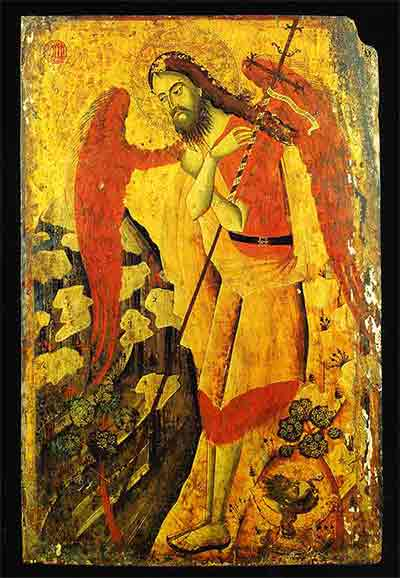
Church icon

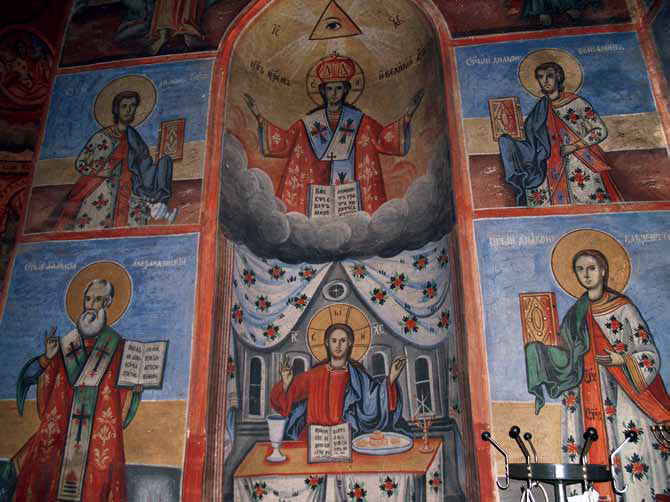
Church fresco

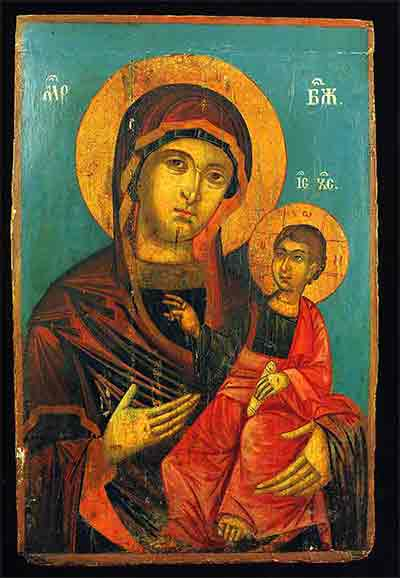
Church icon

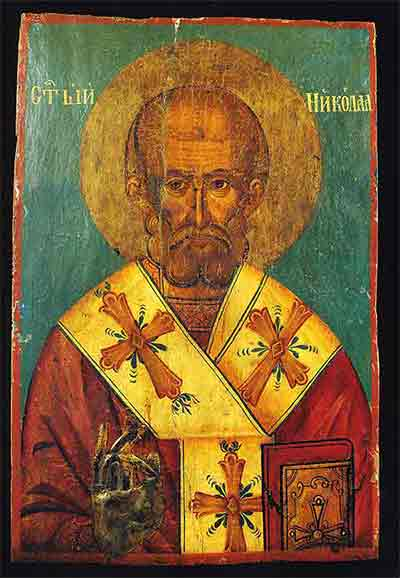
Church icon

== See also ==
- St. Barbara the Great Martyr and St. Sava of Jerusalem Church, Vevčani
- Ascension of Christ Lower Church, Vevčani
- Ascension of Christ Upper Church, Vevčani
- Dormition of the Theotokos Church, Vevčani
- St. George the Great Martyr and Victory Bearer Church, Vevčani
- St. Demetrius the Great Martyr Chapel, Vevčani
- St. Paraskevi the Venerable Chapel, Vevčani
- Mid-Pentecost Chapel, Vevčani
- St. Kyriaki Chapel, Vevčani
- Epiphany Chapel, Vevčani
