= Mid-Pentecost Chapel, Vevčani =

Mid-Pentecost Chapel
- Параклис „Св. Преполовение“
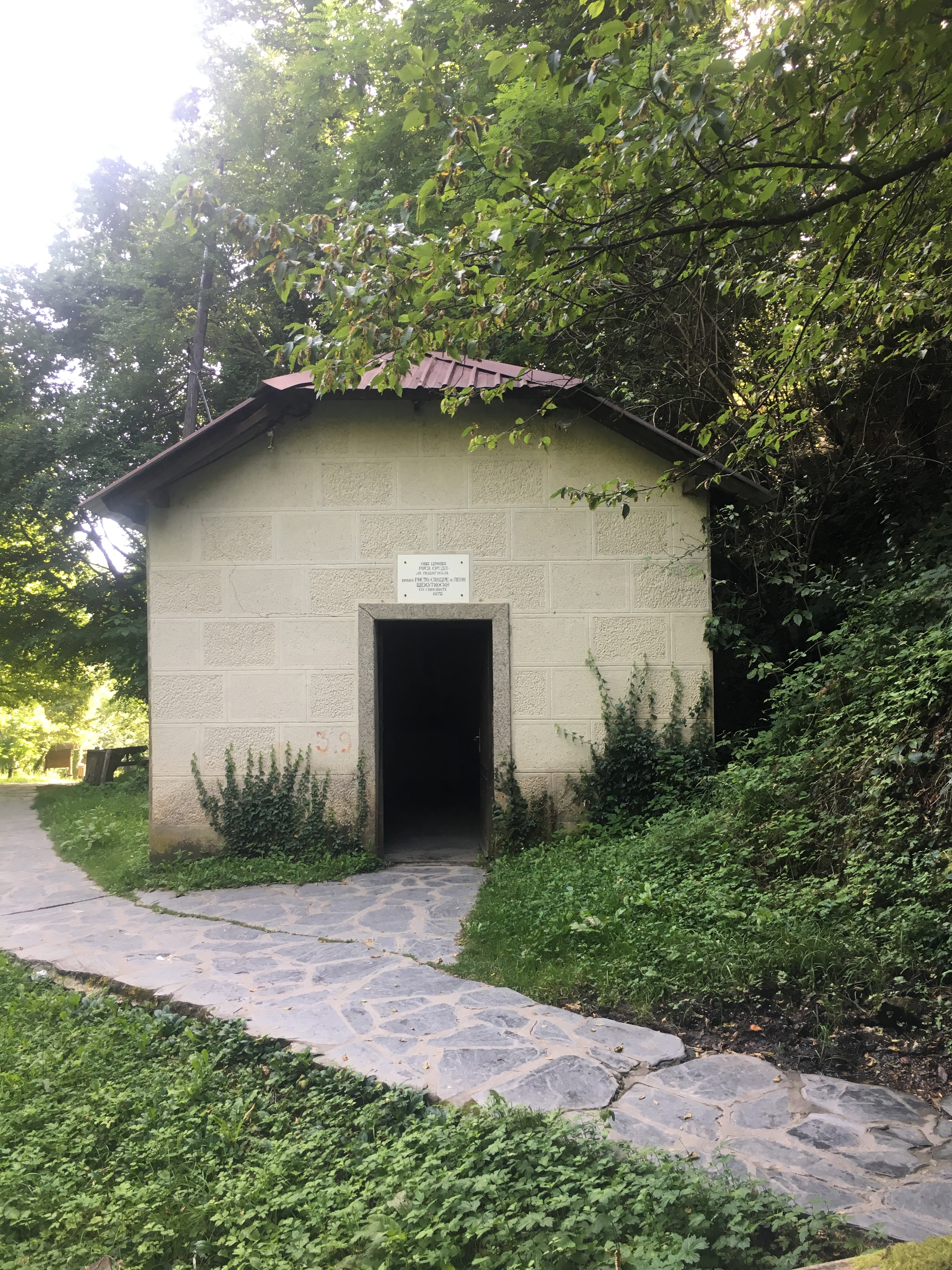
- The temple in 2018
- Mid-Pentecost Chapel
- 41.239283°N 20.585111°E
- Location: Vevčani
- Country: North Macedonia
- Denomination: Eastern Orthodox; Macedonian Orthodox Church
- Website: www.dke.org.mk

History
- Dedication: Mid-Pentecost

Architecture
- Functional status: yes
- Completed: 1972

Administration
- Diocese: Debar and Kičevo Diocese
- Parish: Vevčani Parish

The Mid-Pentecost Chapel is a Macedonian Orthodox chapel, colloquially referred to as a church, in the village of Vevčani.

== Location ==
The church is located within the Vevčani Springs area. There is a spring in the temple, that is, a fountain with, as they claimed, holy water.

== History ==
The church was built in 1972 by the brothers Hristo, Sandre and Leon Šekutkoski, as donors.

== Gallery ==
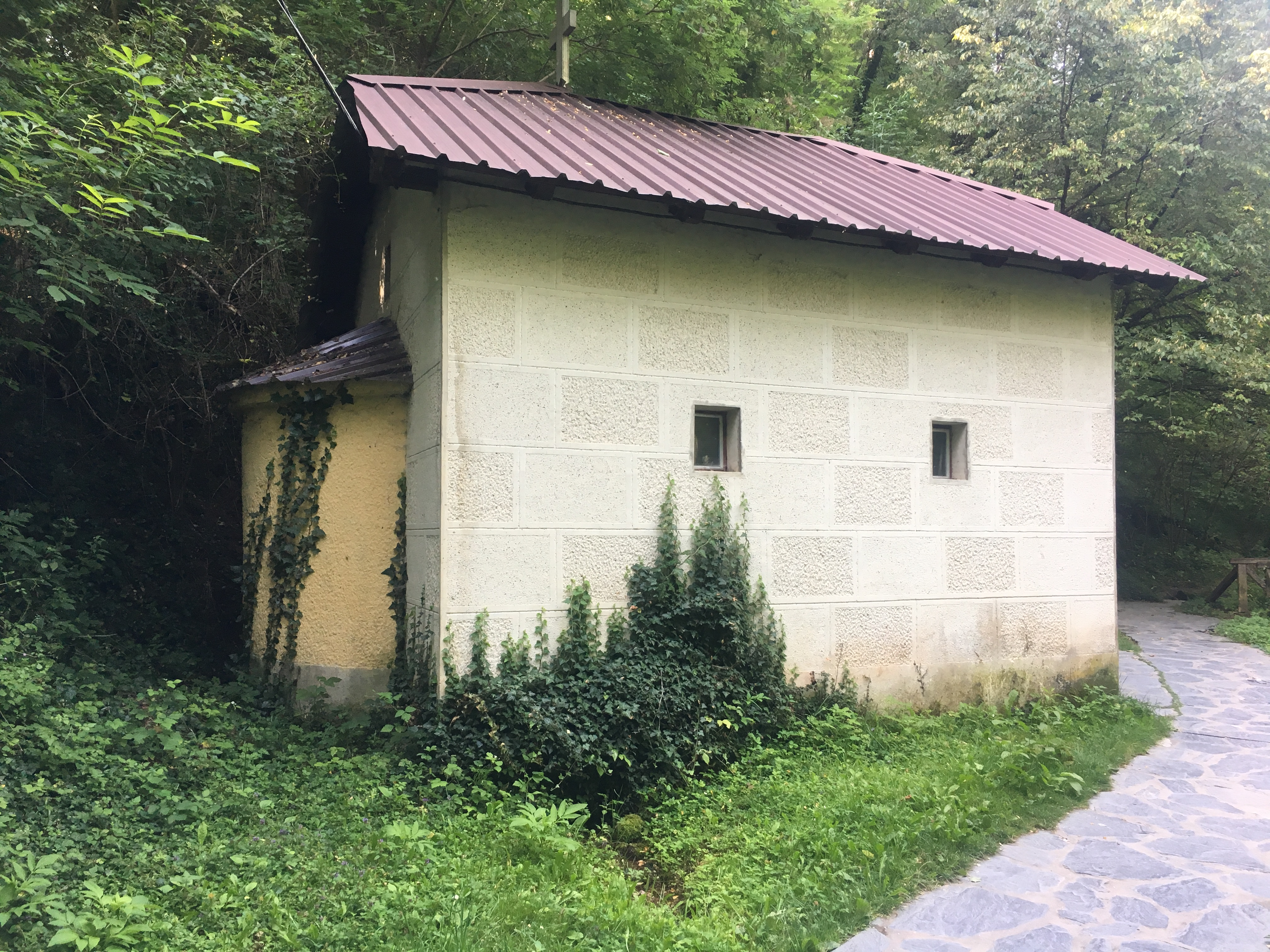
Side view of the temple

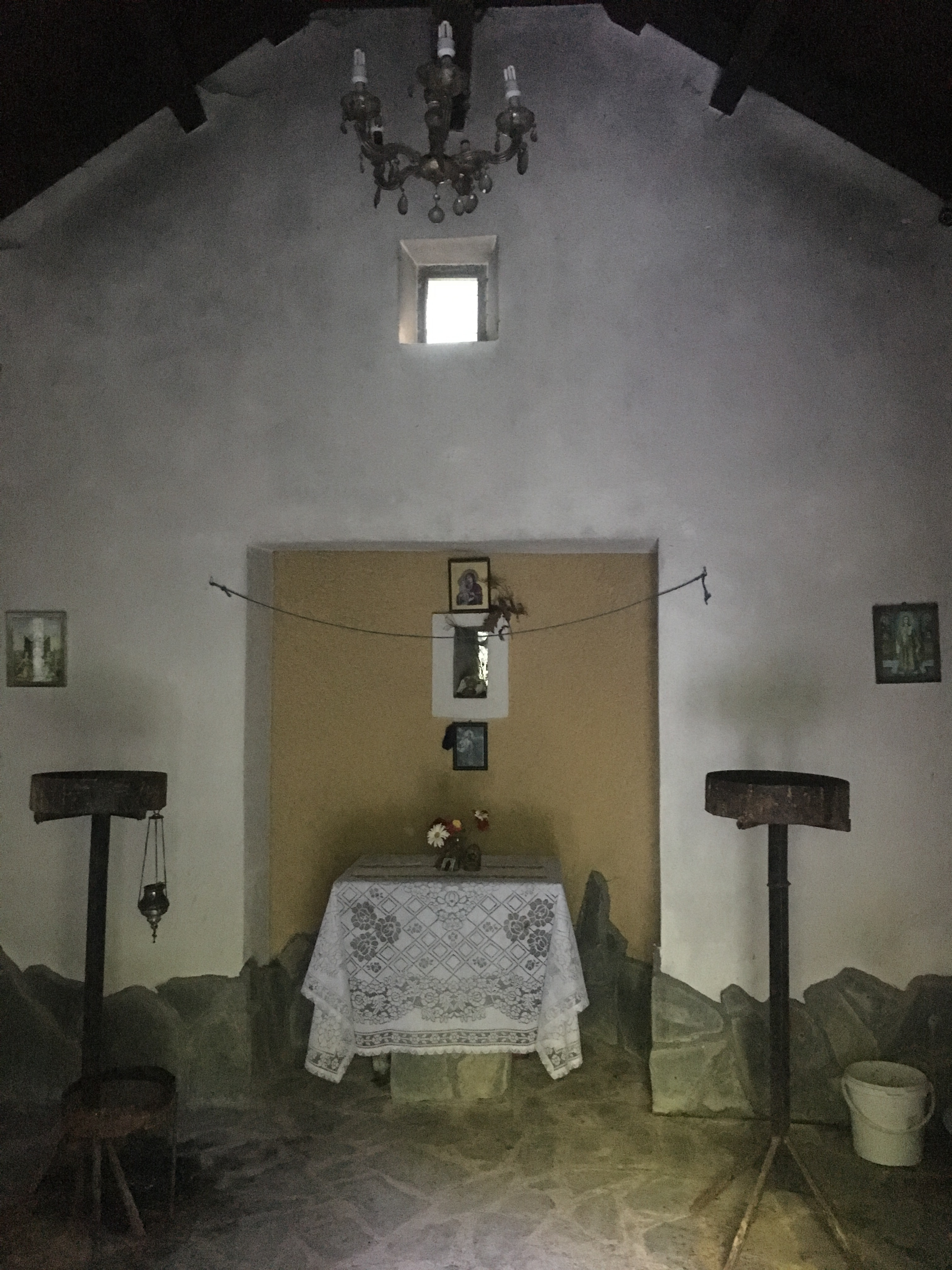
Interior of the temple

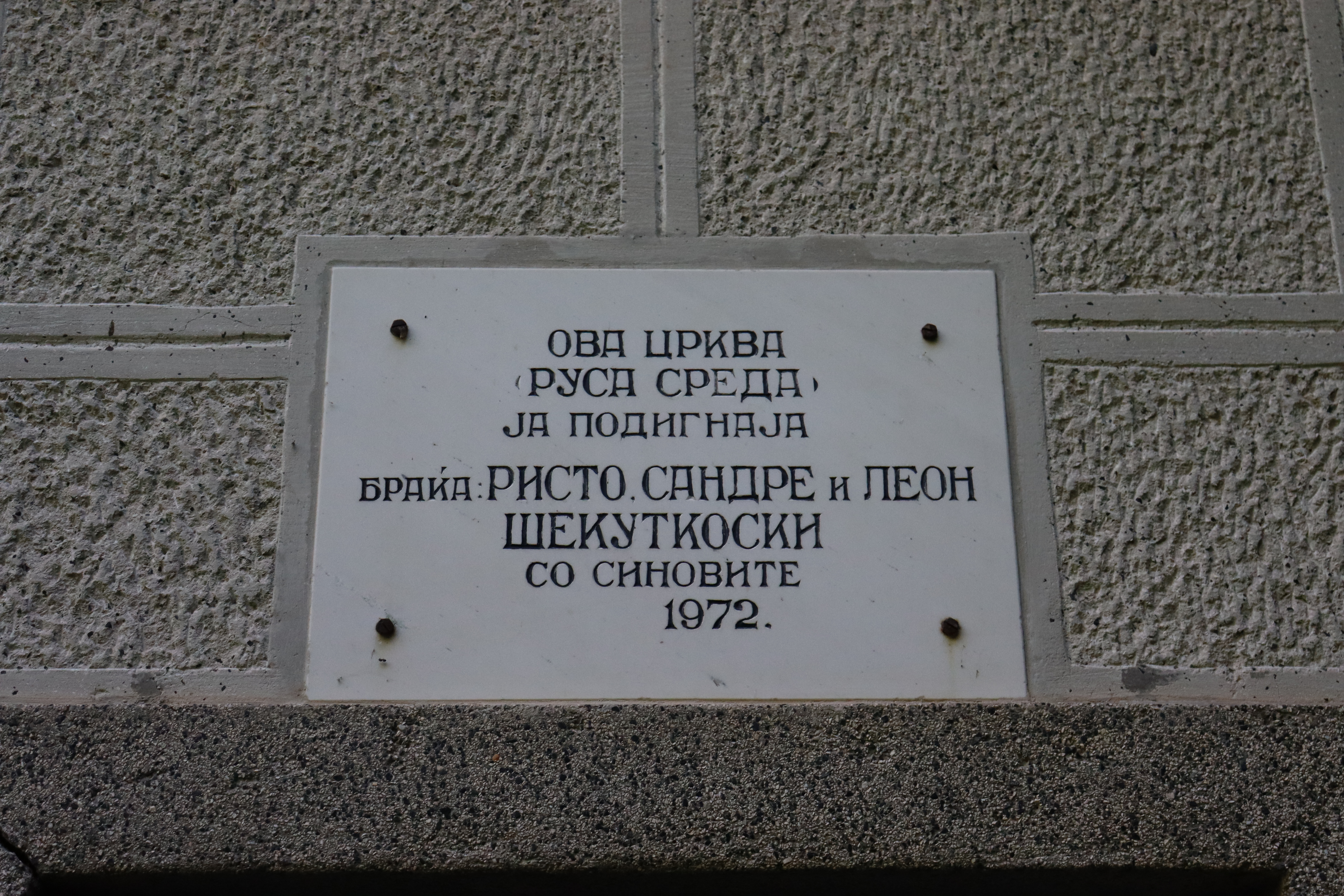
The plaque that mentions the donors

== See also ==
- St. Nicholas Church, Vevčani
- St. Barbara the Great Martyr and St. Sava of Jerusalem Church, Vevčani
- Ascension of Christ Lower Church, Vevčani
- Ascension of Christ Upper Church, Vevčani
- Dormition of the Theotokos Church, Vevčani
- St. George the Great Martyr and Victory Bearer Church, Vevčani
- St. Demetrius the Great Martyr Chapel, Vevčani
- St. Paraskevi the Venerable Chapel, Vevčani
- St. Kyriaki Chapel, Vevčani
- Epiphany Chapel, Vevčani
