= St. Paraskevi the Venerable Chapel, Vevčani =

St. Paraskevi the Venerable Chapel
- Параклис „Св. Преподобна Параскева“
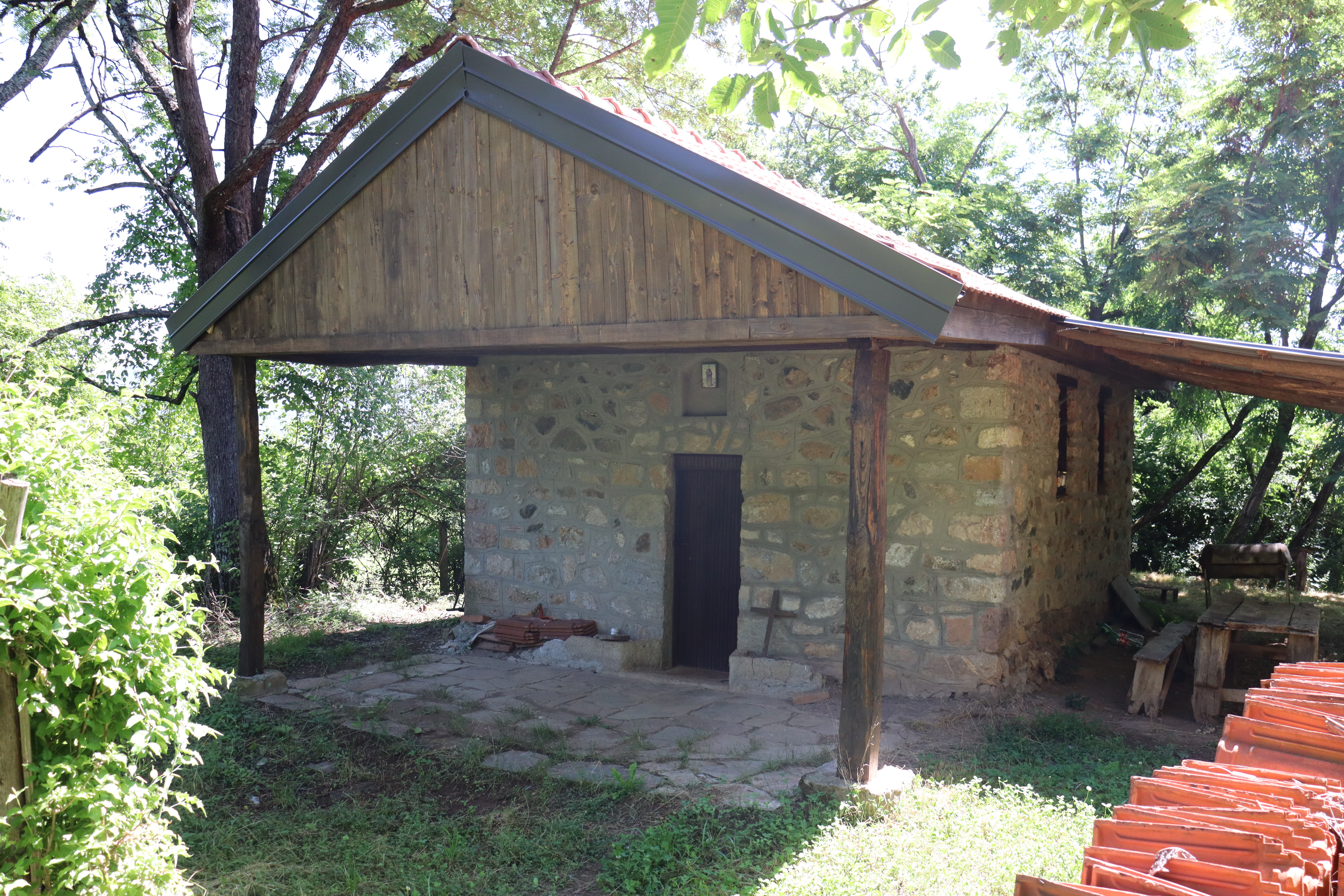
- The temple in 2023
- St. Paraskevi the Venerable Chapel
- 41.245806°N 20.598111°E
- Location: Vevčani
- Country: North Macedonia
- Denomination: Eastern Orthodox; Macedonian Orthodox Church
- Website: www.dke.org.mk

History
- Dedication: Paraskeva of the Balkans

Architecture
- Functional status: yes

Administration
- Diocese: Debar and Kičevo Diocese
- Parish: Vevčani Parish

The St. Paraskevi the Venerable Chapel is a Macedonian Orthodox chapel, colloquially referred to as a church, in the village of Vevčani.

== Location ==
The chapel is located in the northern part of Vevčani, in the locality/area called Padarnica. The church is located east of the St. Demetrius the Great Martyr Chapel, in a courtyard of 342 m^{2}.

== History ==
It is not known when it was built. The fresco painting was done in 1924 by the painter Nikola Bubanoski from Vevčani.

== Gallery ==
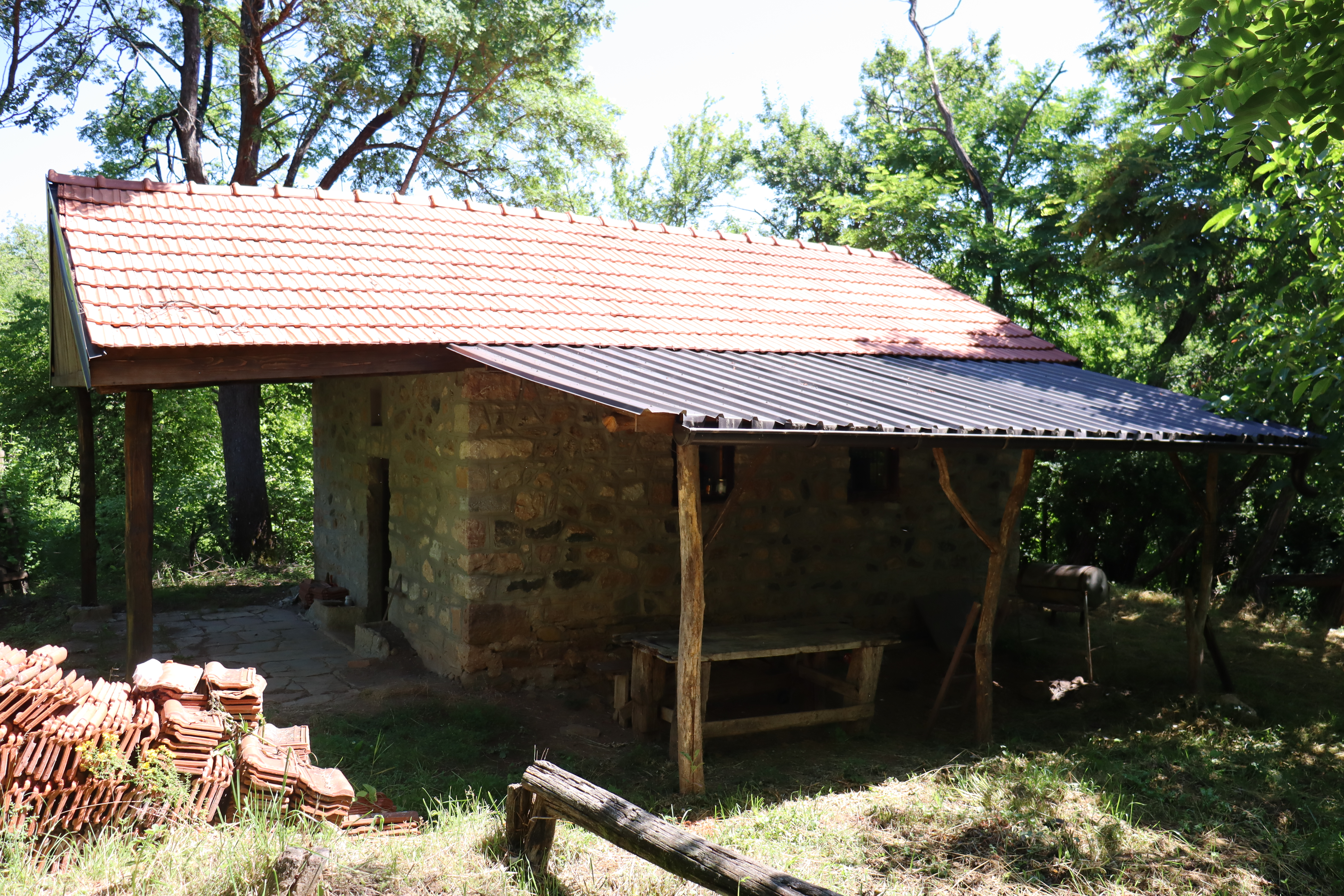

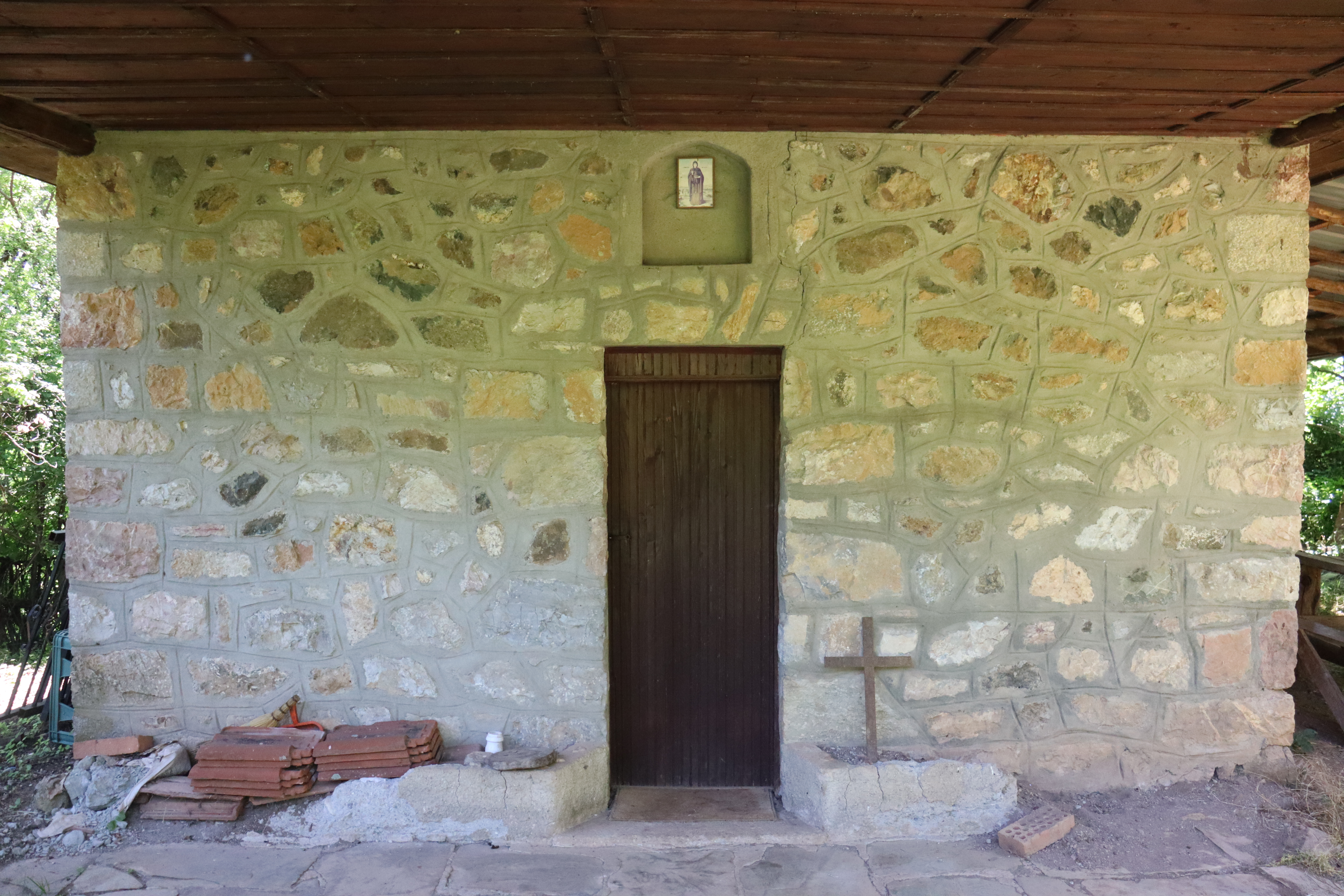

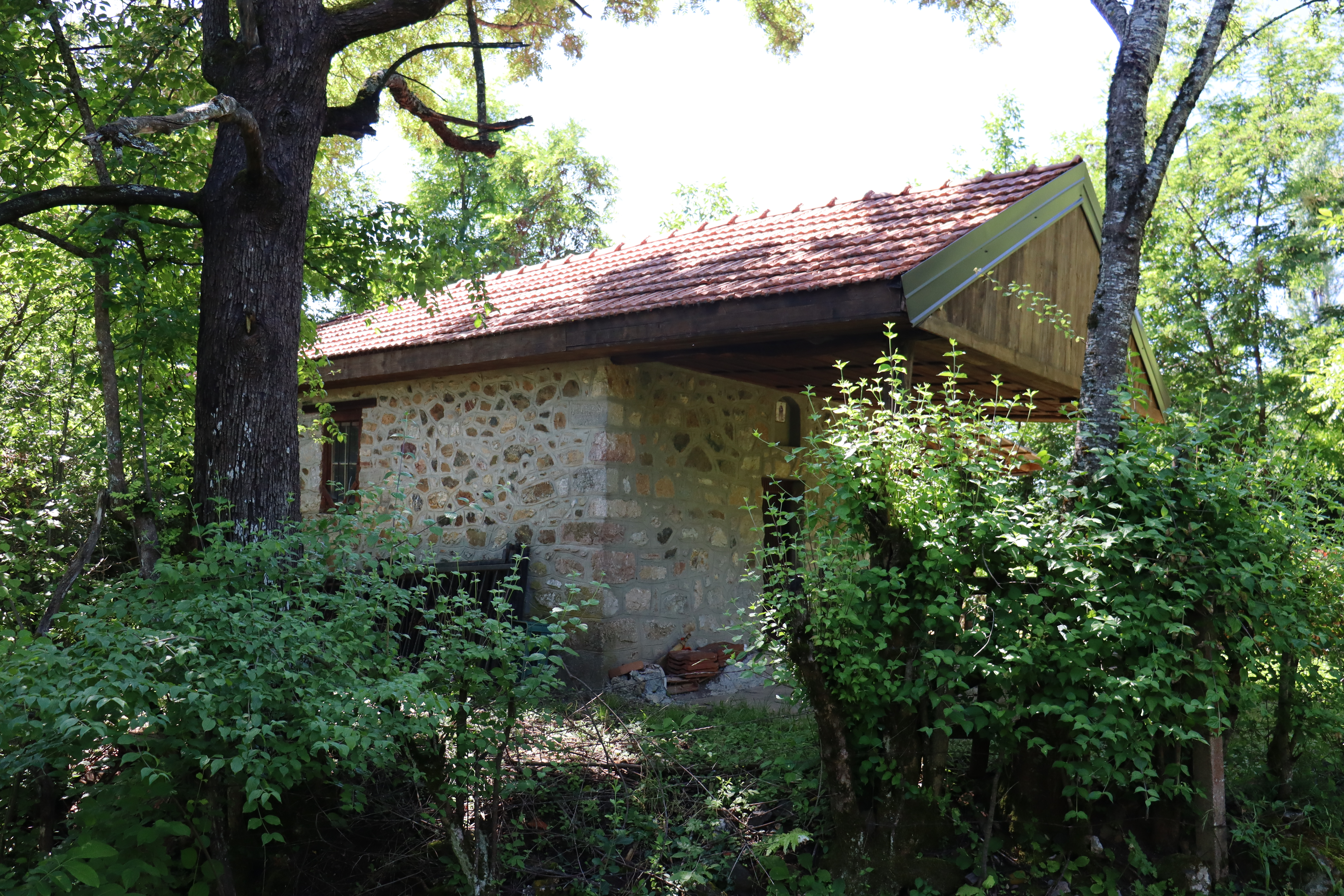

== See also ==
- St. Nicholas Church, Vevčani
- St. Barbara the Great Martyr and St. Sava of Jerusalem Church, Vevčani
- Ascension of Christ Lower Church, Vevčani
- Ascension of Christ Upper Church, Vevčani
- Dormition of the Theotokos Church, Vevčani
- St. George the Great Martyr and Victory Bearer Church, Vevčani
- St. Demetrius the Great Martyr Chapel, Vevčani
- Mid-Pentecost Chapel, Vevčani
- St. Kyriaki Chapel, Vevčani
- Epiphany Chapel, Vevčani
