= St. George the Great Martyr and Victory Bearer Church, Vevčani =

St. George the Great Martyr and Victory Bearer Church
- Црква „Св. Великомаченик Георгиј – Победоносец“
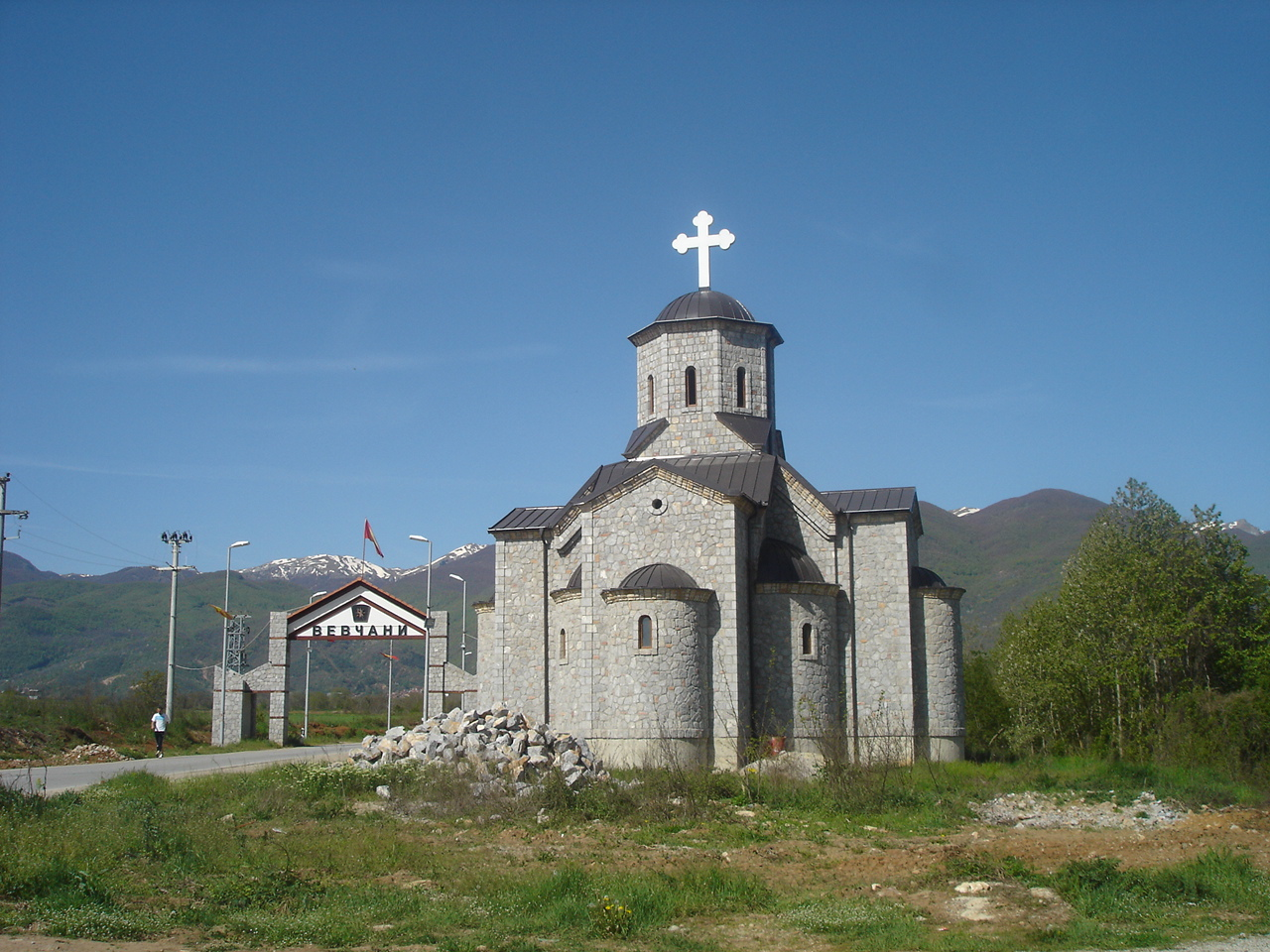
- The church in 2016
- St. George the Great Martyr and Victory Bearer Church
- 41.250972°N 20.631889°E
- Location: Vevčani Municipality
- Country: North Macedonia
- Denomination: Eastern Orthodox; Macedonian Orthodox Church
- Website: www.dke.org.mk

History
- Dedication: Saint George

Architecture
- Functional status: yes
- Architect: Stojče Naumovski (newer building)
- Groundbreaking: 2013 (newer building)
- Demolished: 1913 (older building)

Administration
- Diocese: Debar and Kičevo Diocese
- Parish: Vevčani Parish

The St. George the Great Martyr and Victory Bearer Church is a Macedonian Orthodox church in the eastern vicinity of the village of Vevčani. The church is also quite close to the village of Velešta to the south-east.

== History ==
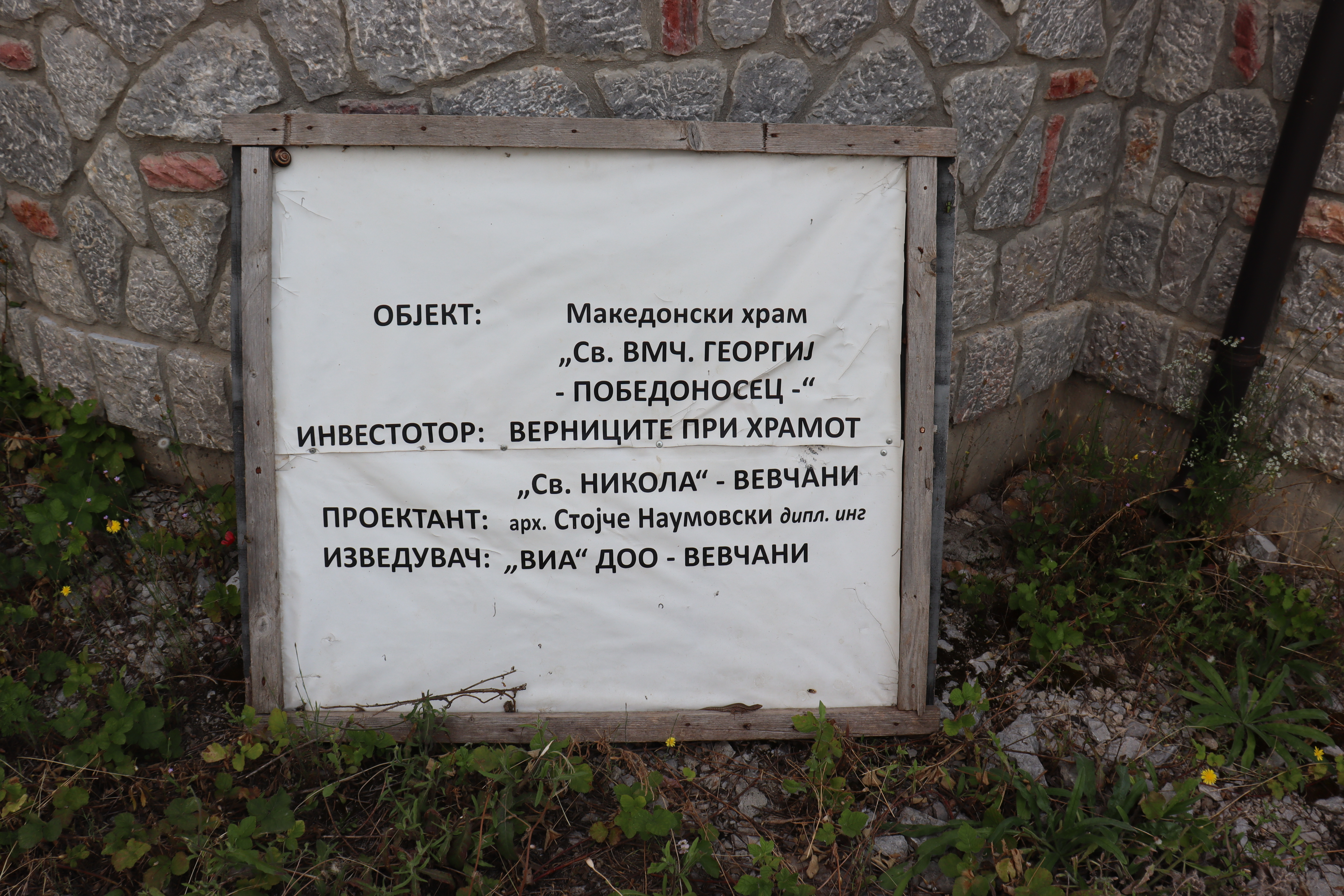
Info board regarding the construction (In Macedonian).

The St. George the Great Martyr and Victory Bearer Church has been rebuilt after exactly 100 years on the foundations of the former Saint George Monastery which was completely destroyed in the Ohrid-Debar uprising of 1913. The reconstruction is on the initiative of the mayor of Vevčani Municipality, according to whom it is very significant not only for the people of Vevčani but also for the entire Drimkol region because this is where the migrant workers from Vevčani were sent off. The foundations for the construction of the church were laid on May 6, 2013 in the presence of the then Prime minister Nikola Gruevski and Metropolitan Timotej of Debar and Kičevo, as well as the then president of the Assembly Trajko Veljanoski. Eight experienced Vevčan craftsmen worked on the masonry, who manually processed the highest quality stone for the facade. The temple is being built with funds from local Vevčani residents and other donations and was supposed to cost about 300 thousand Euros. The architect was Stojče Naumovski, while the construction contractor was Via DOO – Vevčani.

Due to the location on which the church was built, a dispute arose between Struga Municipality and Vevčani Municipality, for which the then Minister of Local Self-Government Tahir Hani confirmed that the church and the gate are located on the territory of Vevčani Municipality. The land where the church is being built used to belong to the state, but according to the then local parish priest Zoran Poposki, a replacement was made for church property of 9 hectares of land where the destroyed monastery dedicated to the Holy Great Martyr George existed, according to the deed of year 1925.

== Architecture ==
The church temple is 15 meters high, with an internal area of 100 m^{2} and seen from the air, it resembles an orthodox cross.

== Gallery ==
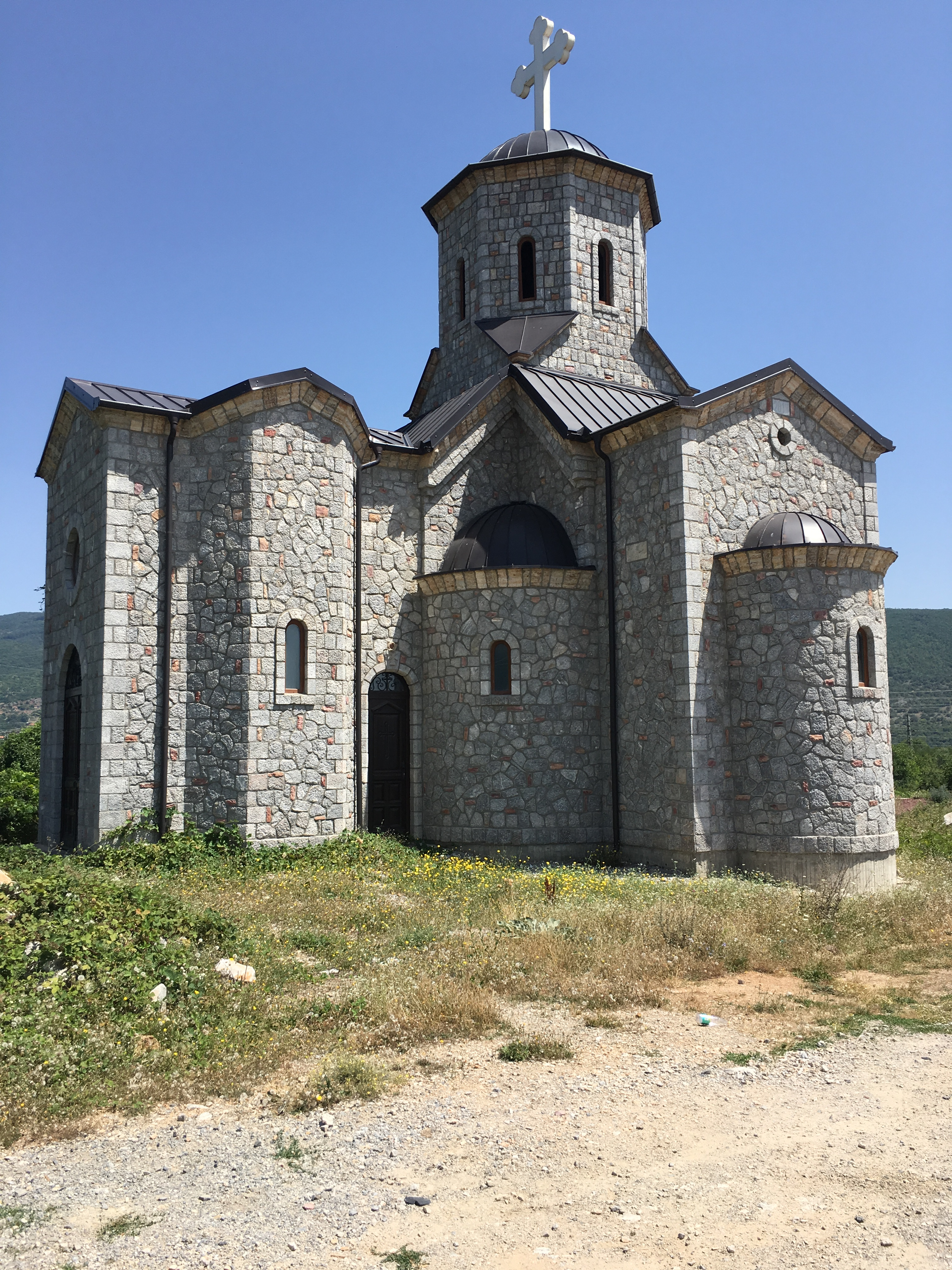
The church in 2018

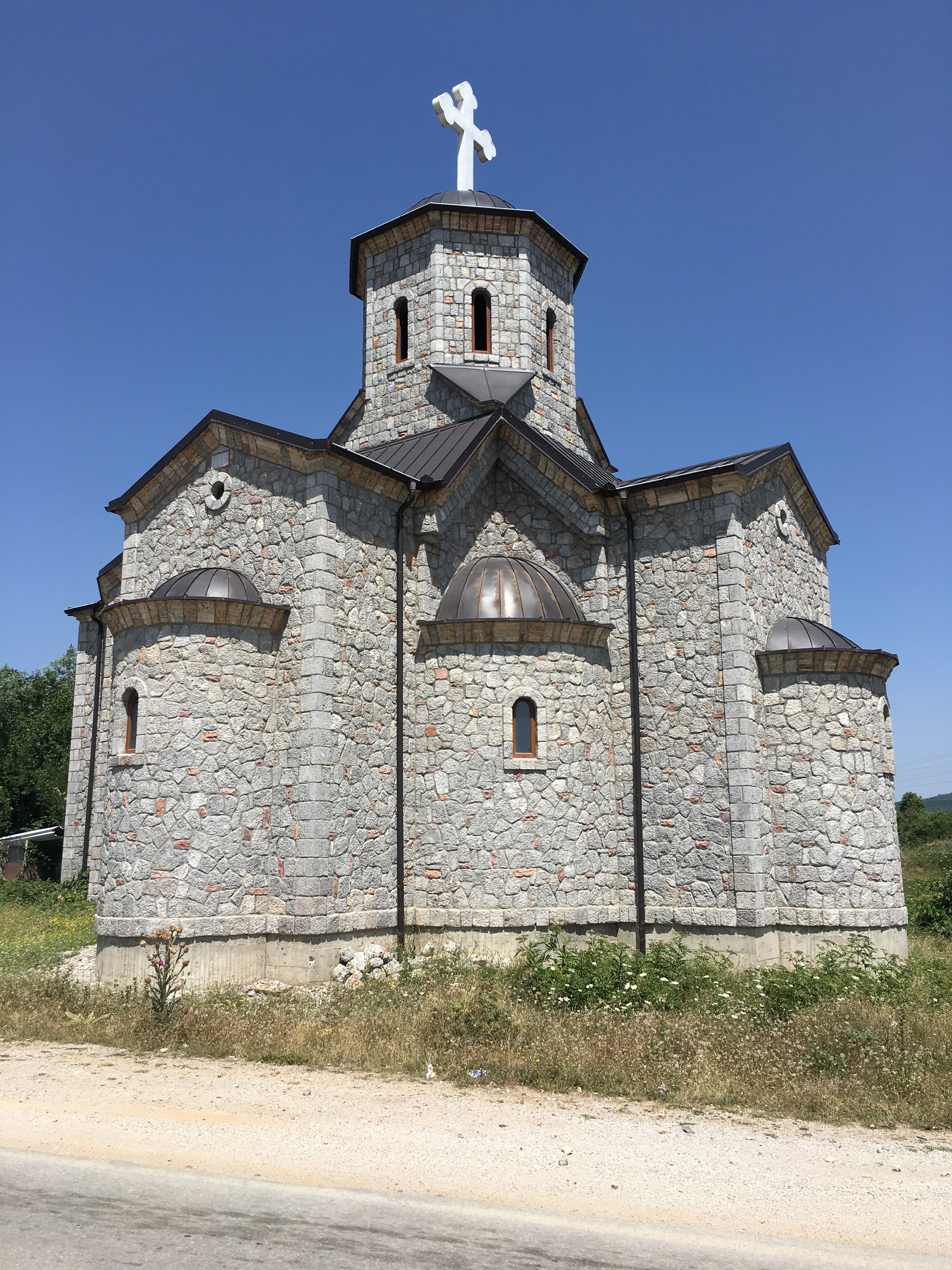
The church in 2018

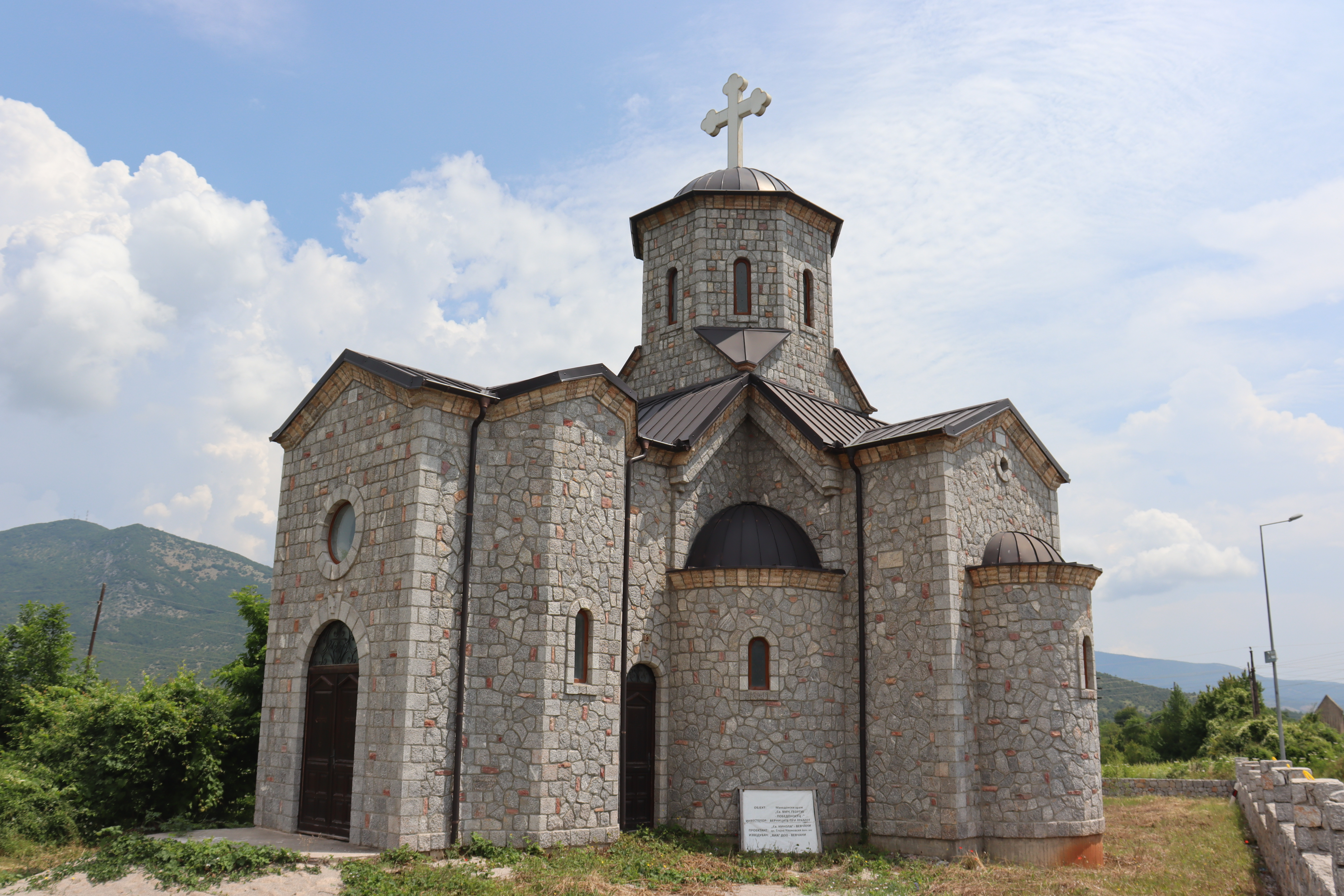
The church in 2023

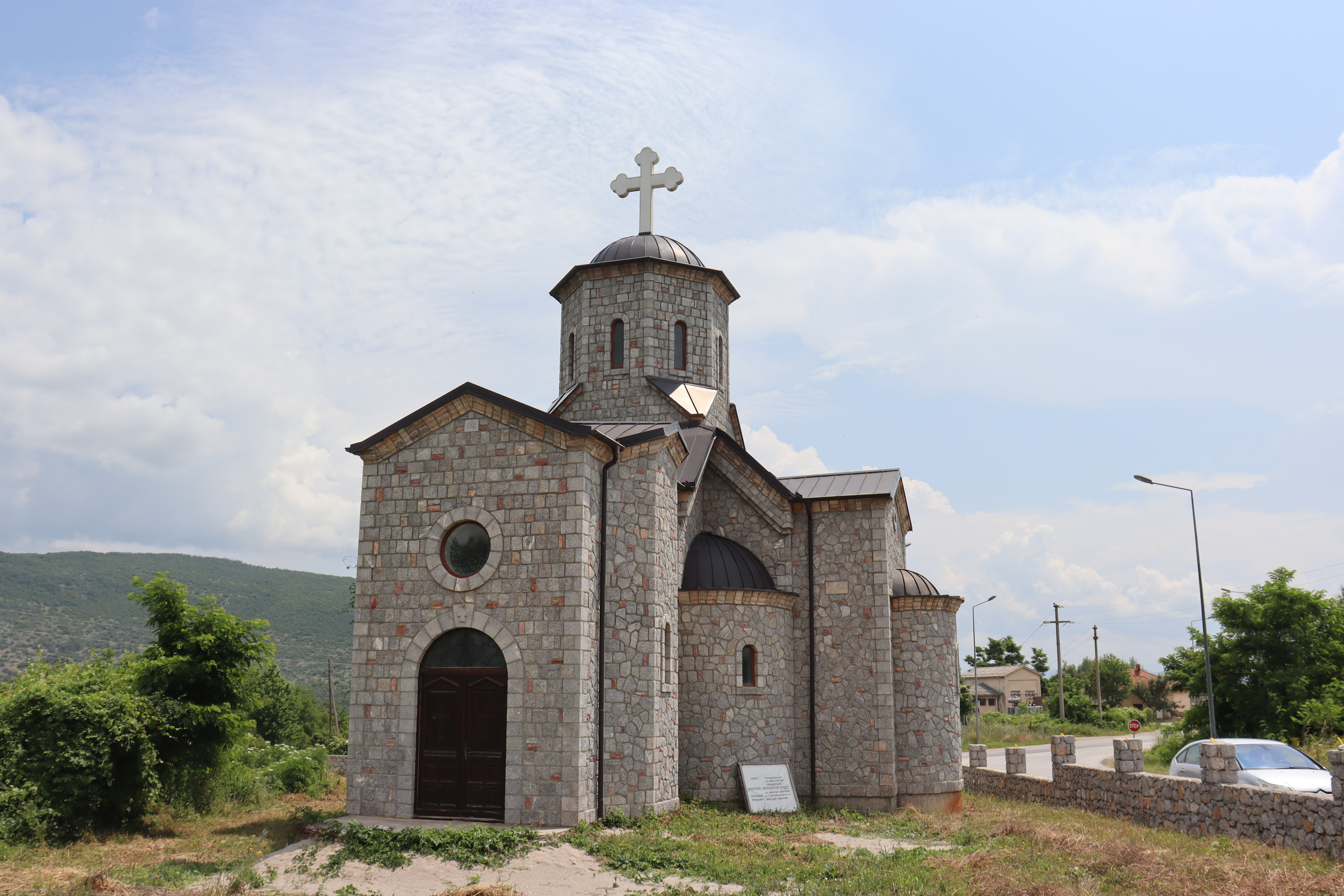
The church in 2023

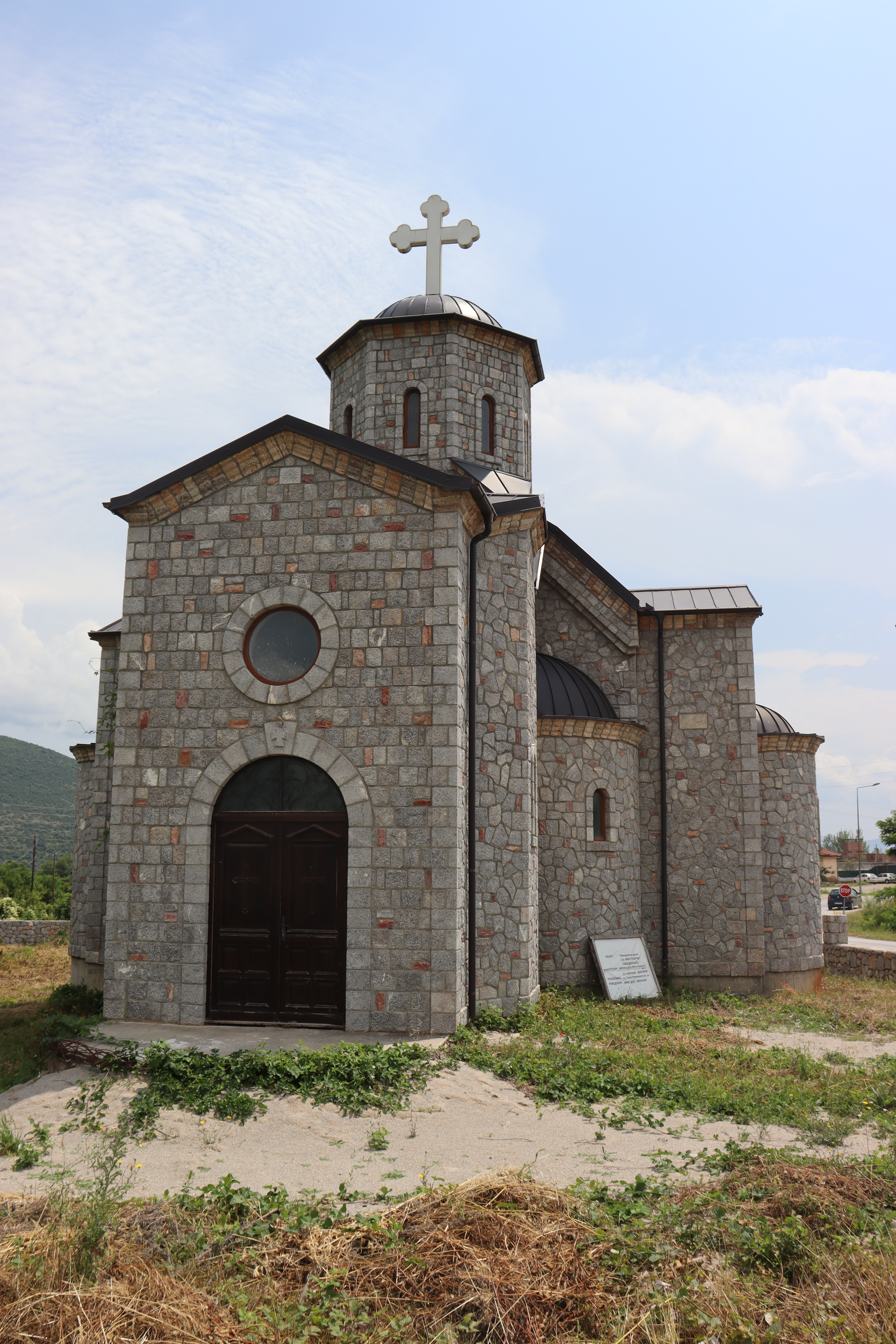
The church in 2023

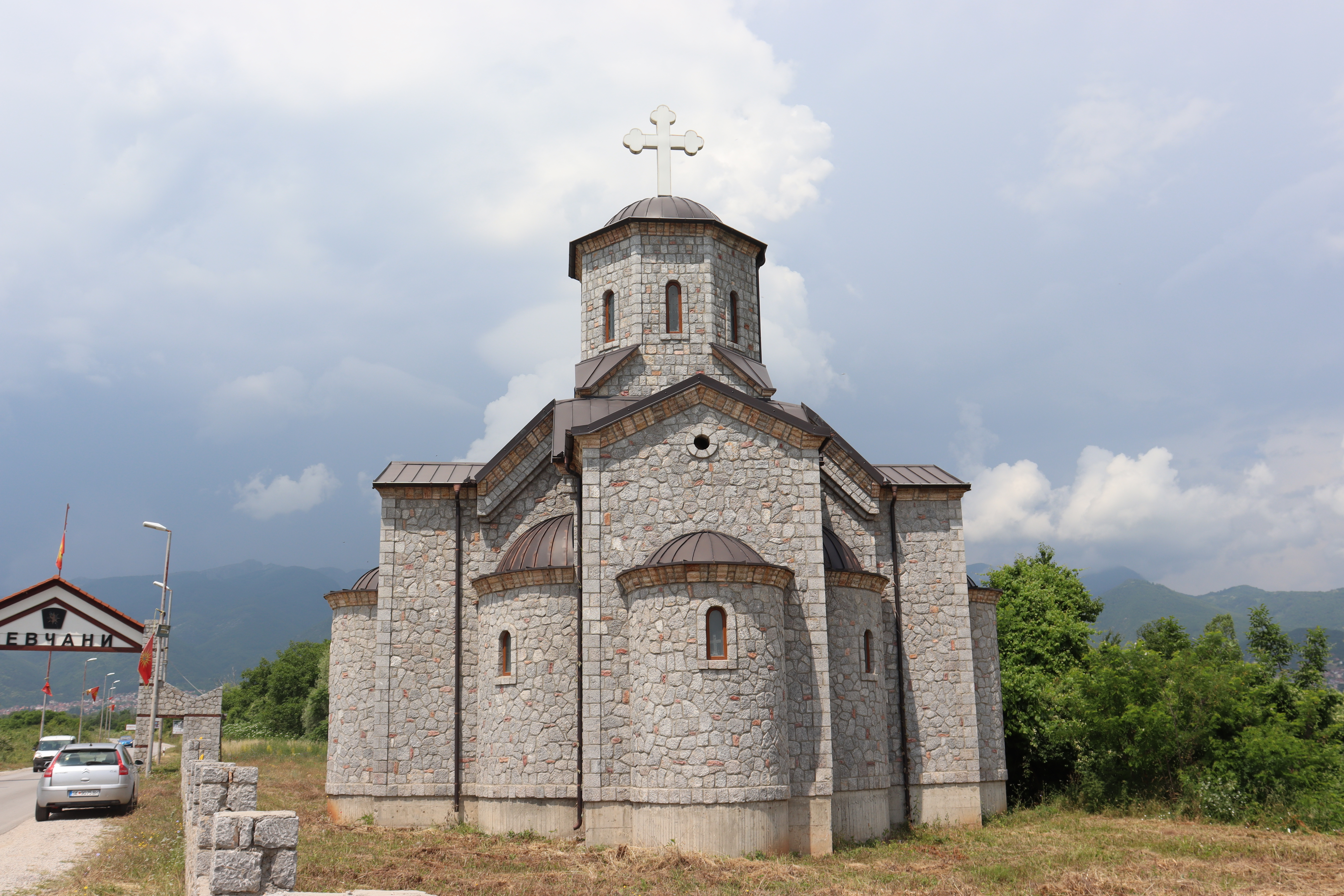
The church in 2023

== See also ==
- St. Nicholas Church, Vevčani
- St. Barbara the Great Martyr and St. Sava of Jerusalem Church, Vevčani
- Ascension of Christ Lower Church, Vevčani
- Ascension of Christ Upper Church, Vevčani
- Dormition of the Theotokos Church, Vevčani
- St. Demetrius the Great Martyr Chapel, Vevčani
- St. Paraskevi the Venerable Chapel, Vevčani
- Mid-Pentecost Chapel, Vevčani
- St. Kyriaki Chapel, Vevčani
- Epiphany Chapel, Vevčani
