= St. Demetrius the Great Martyr Chapel, Vevčani =

St. Demetrius the Great Martyr Chapel
- Параклис „Св. Великомаченик Димитриј“
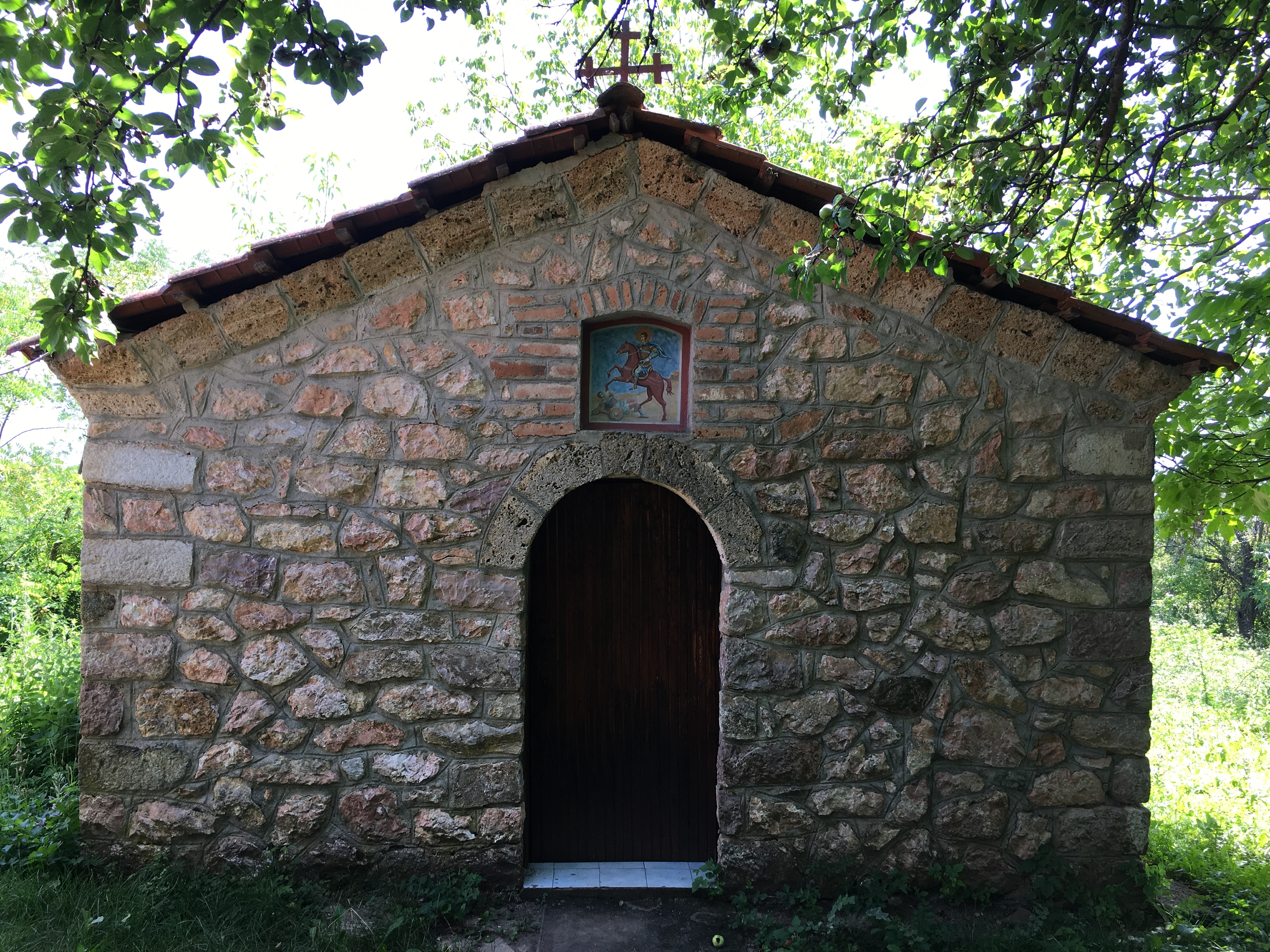
- The temple in 2018
- St. Demetrius the Great Martyr Chapel
- 41.246047°N 20.596494°E
- Location: Vevčani
- Country: North Macedonia
- Denomination: Eastern Orthodox; Macedonian Orthodox Church
- Website: www.dke.org.mk

History
- Dedication: Demetrius of Thessalonica

Architecture
- Functional status: yes

Administration
- Diocese: Debar and Kičevo Diocese
- Parish: Vevčani Parish

The St. Demetrius the Great Martyr Chapel is a Macedonian Orthodox chapel, colloquially referred to as a church, in the village of Vevčani.

== Location ==
The chapel is located in the northern part of Vevčani, in the locality/area called Padarnica. The total area of the church yard is 340 m^{2}. It is located nearby, east of the local cemetery and its St. Barbara the Great Martyr and St. Sava of Jerusalem Church and west of the St. Paraskevi the Venerable Chapel.

== History ==
It is not known when the chapel was built. It was restored in the 1980s.

== Architecture ==
=== Fresco painting ===
The frescoes were made by Solomon Tasovski from Bitola in 1914.

== Gallery ==
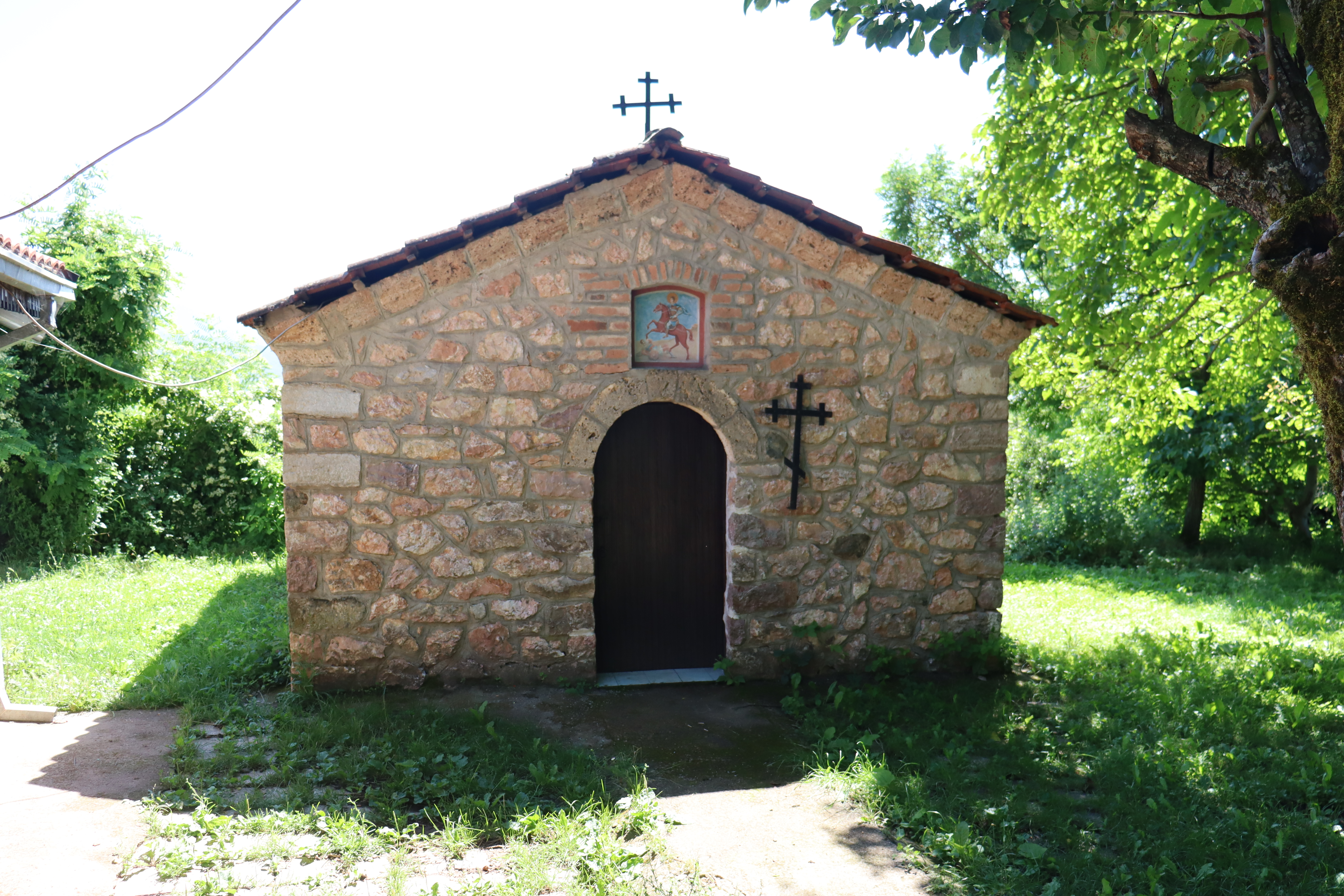
The temple in 2023

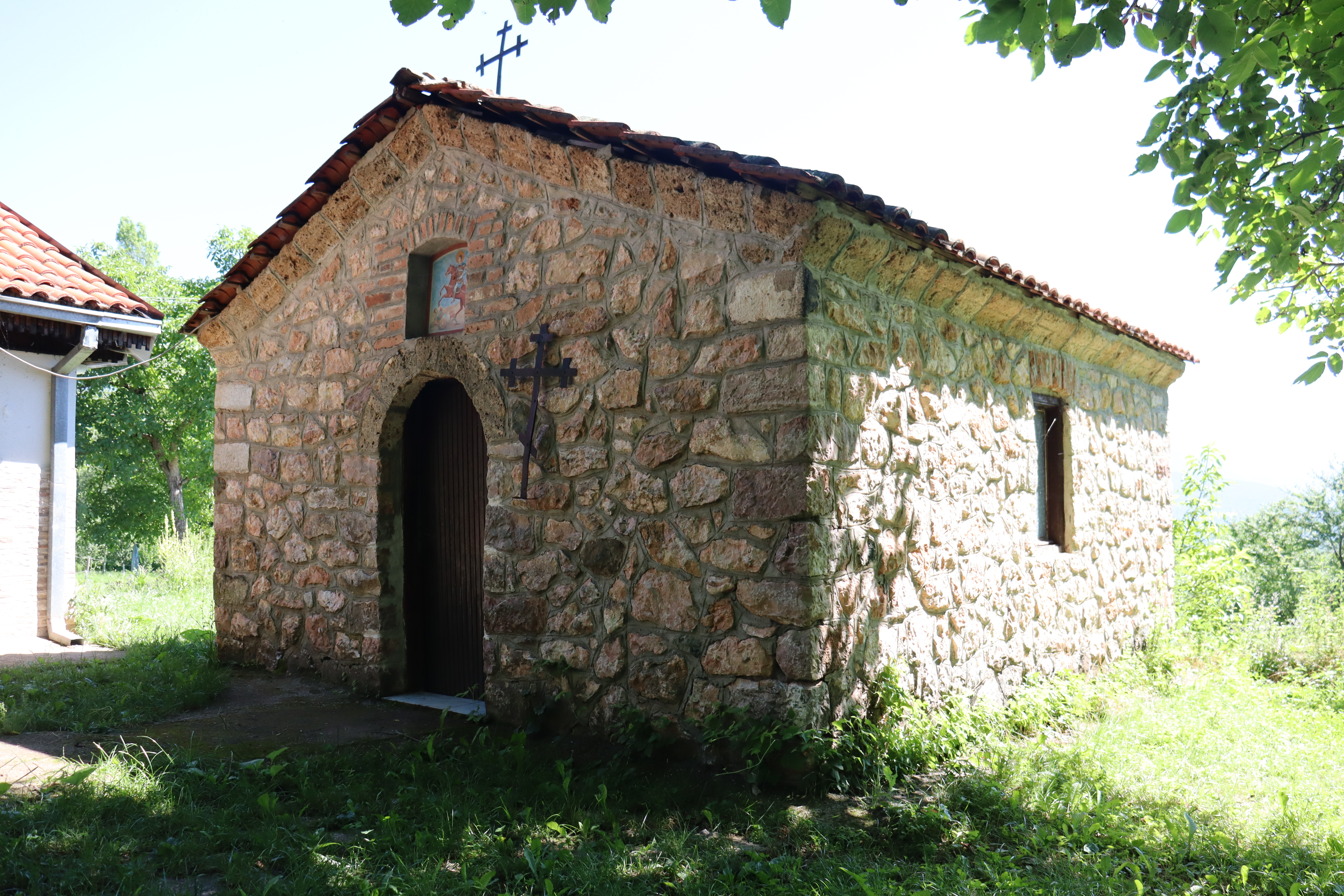
The temple in 2023

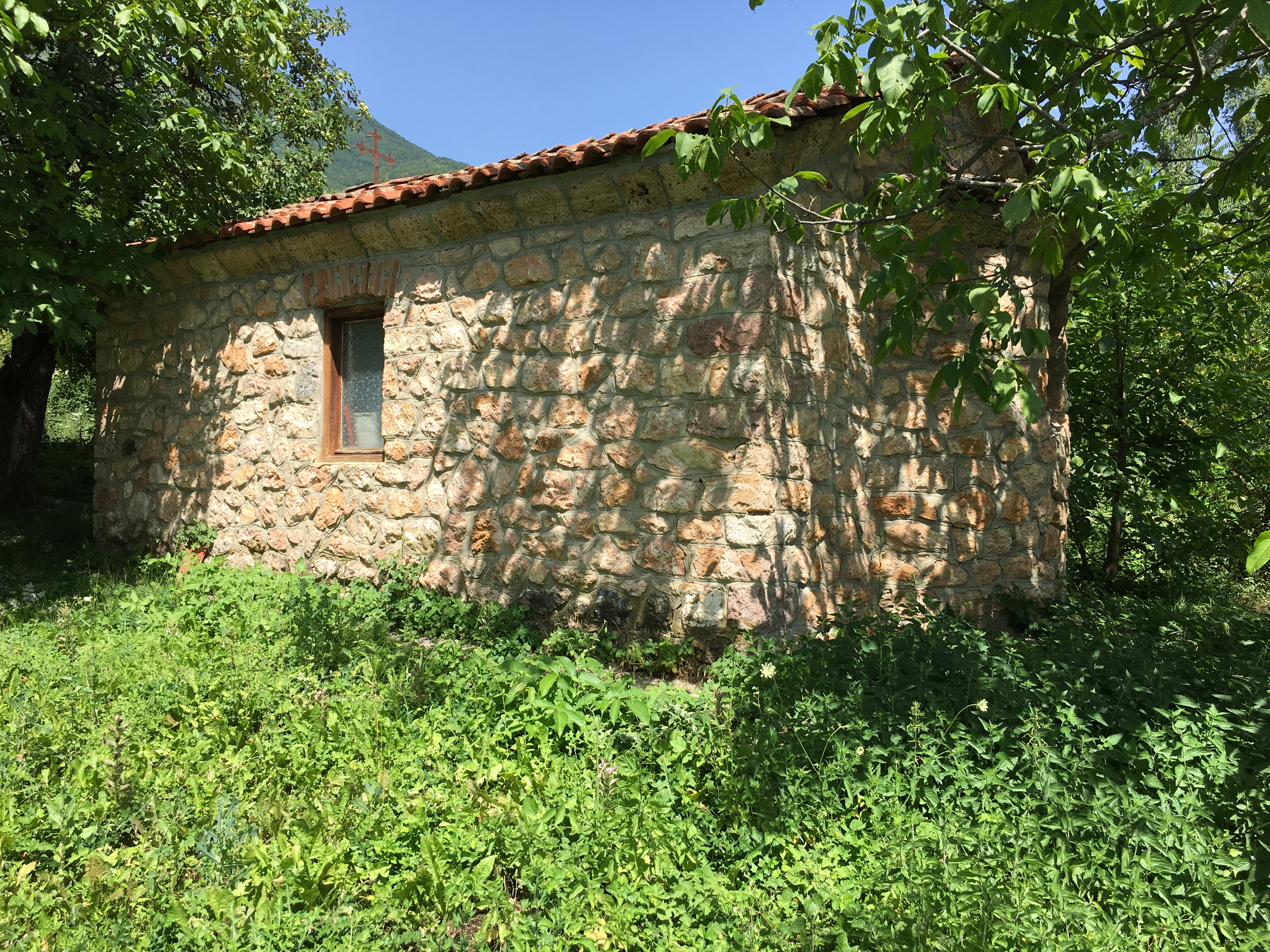
Side view of the chapel, 2018

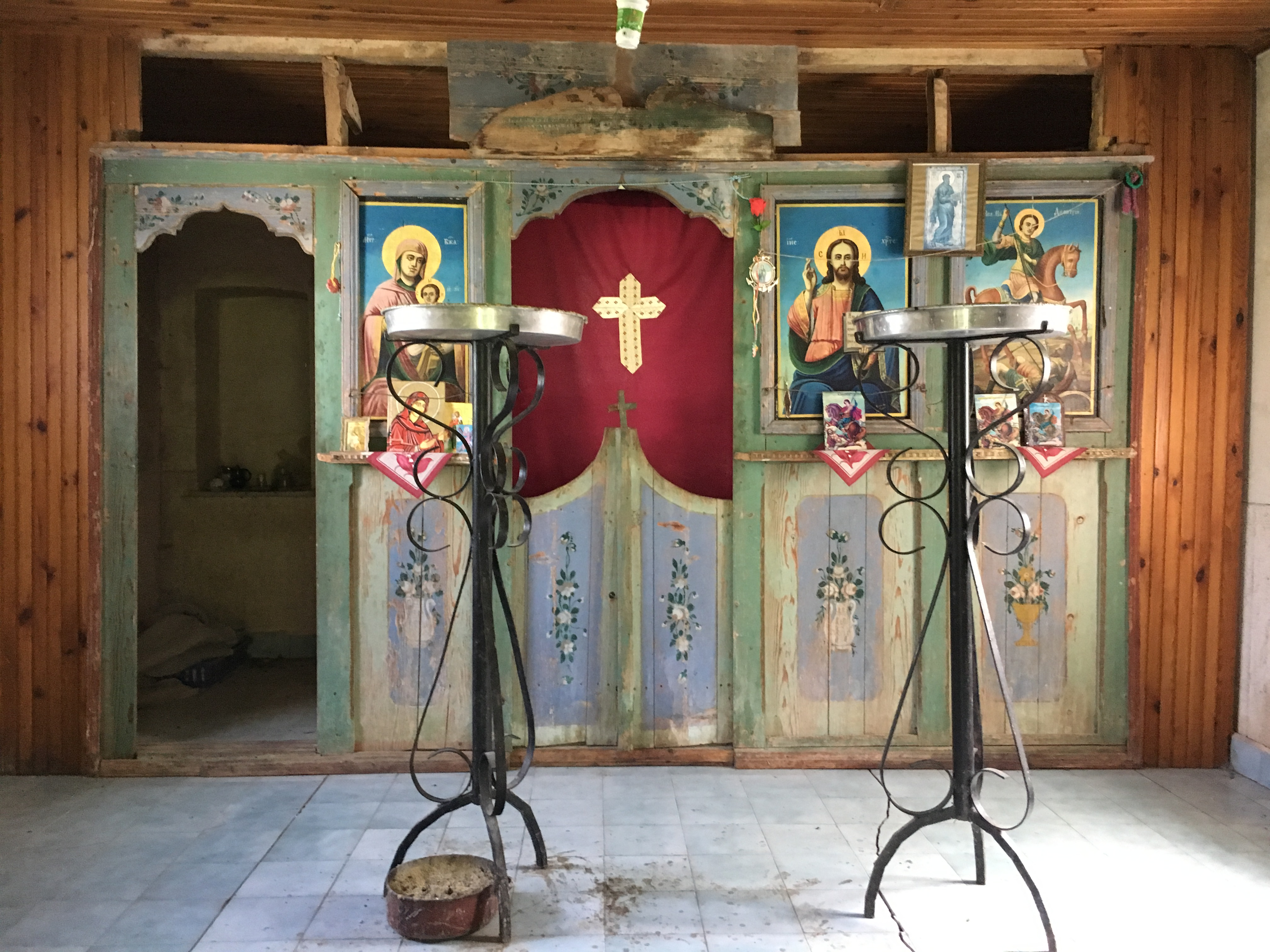
The interior of the chapel, 2018

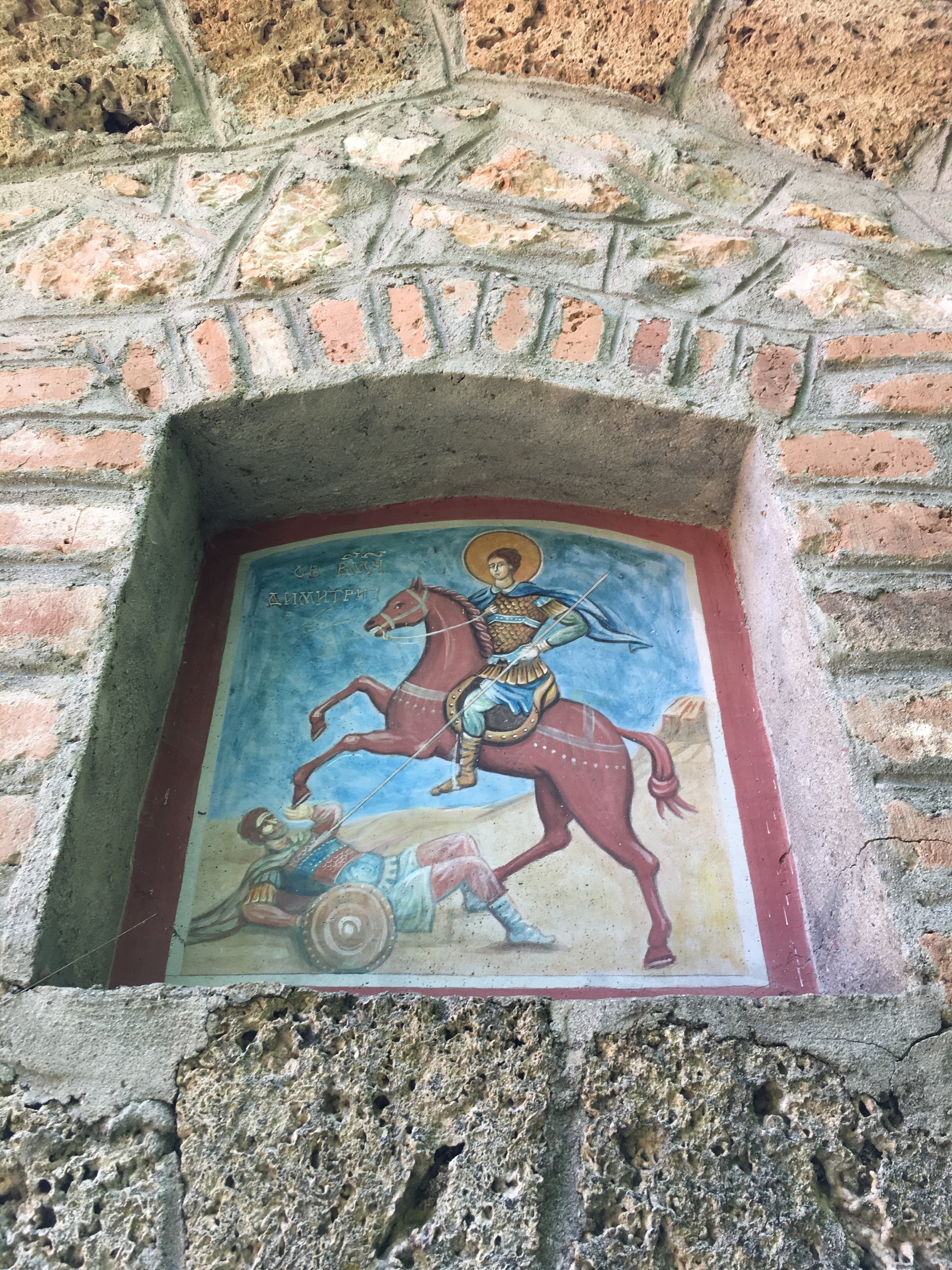
The saint's fresco above the chapel's entrance, 2018

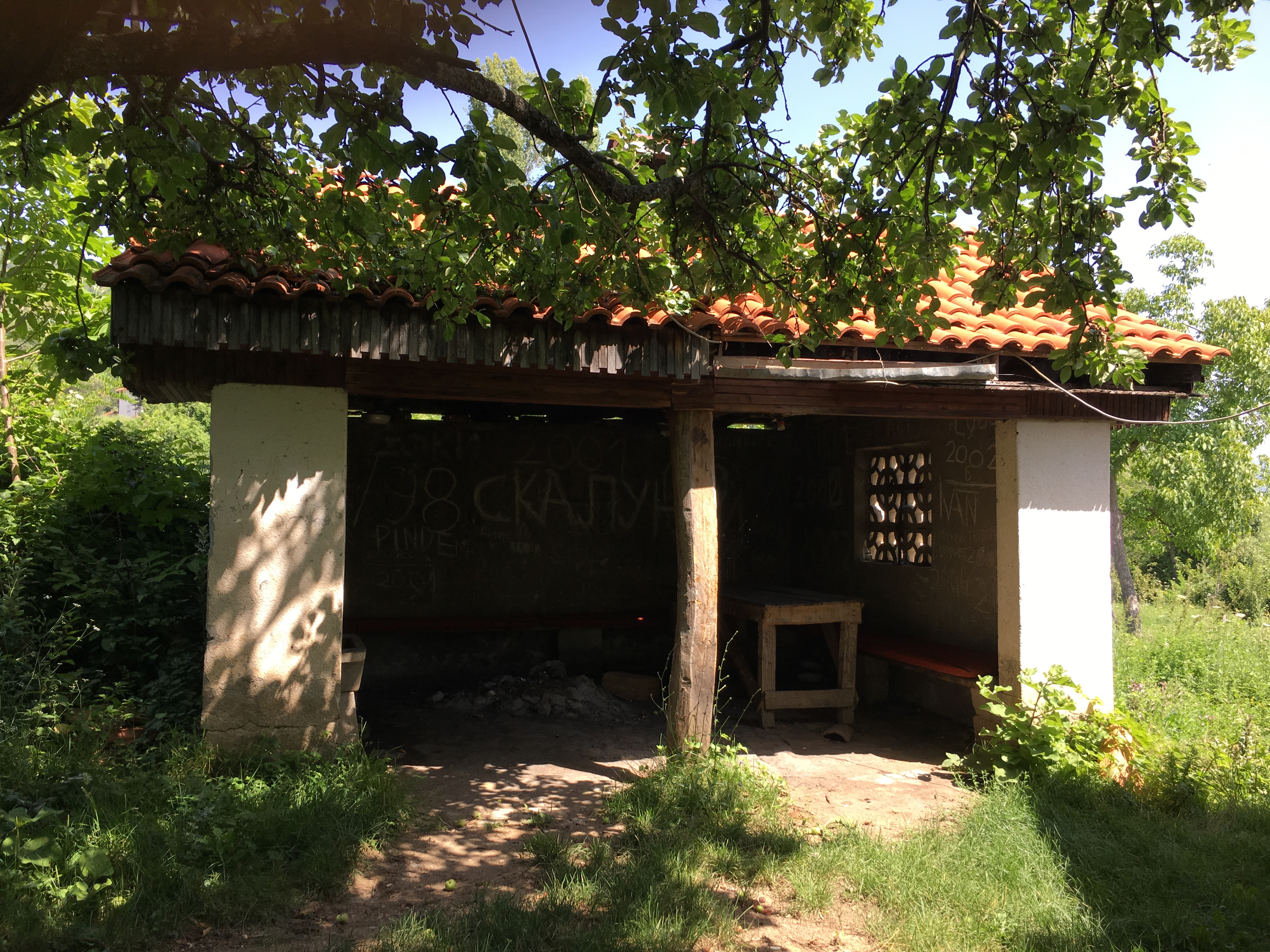
The dining building of the chapel, 2018

== See also ==
- St. Nicholas Church, Vevčani
- St. Barbara the Great Martyr and St. Sava of Jerusalem Church, Vevčani
- Ascension of Christ Lower Church, Vevčani
- Ascension of Christ Upper Church, Vevčani
- Dormition of the Theotokos Church, Vevčani
- St. George the Great Martyr and Victory Bearer Church, Vevčani
- St. Paraskevi the Venerable Chapel, Vevčani
- Mid-Pentecost Chapel, Vevčani
- St. Kyriaki Chapel, Vevčani
- Epiphany Chapel, Vevčani
