= House of Kalajdžieski family =

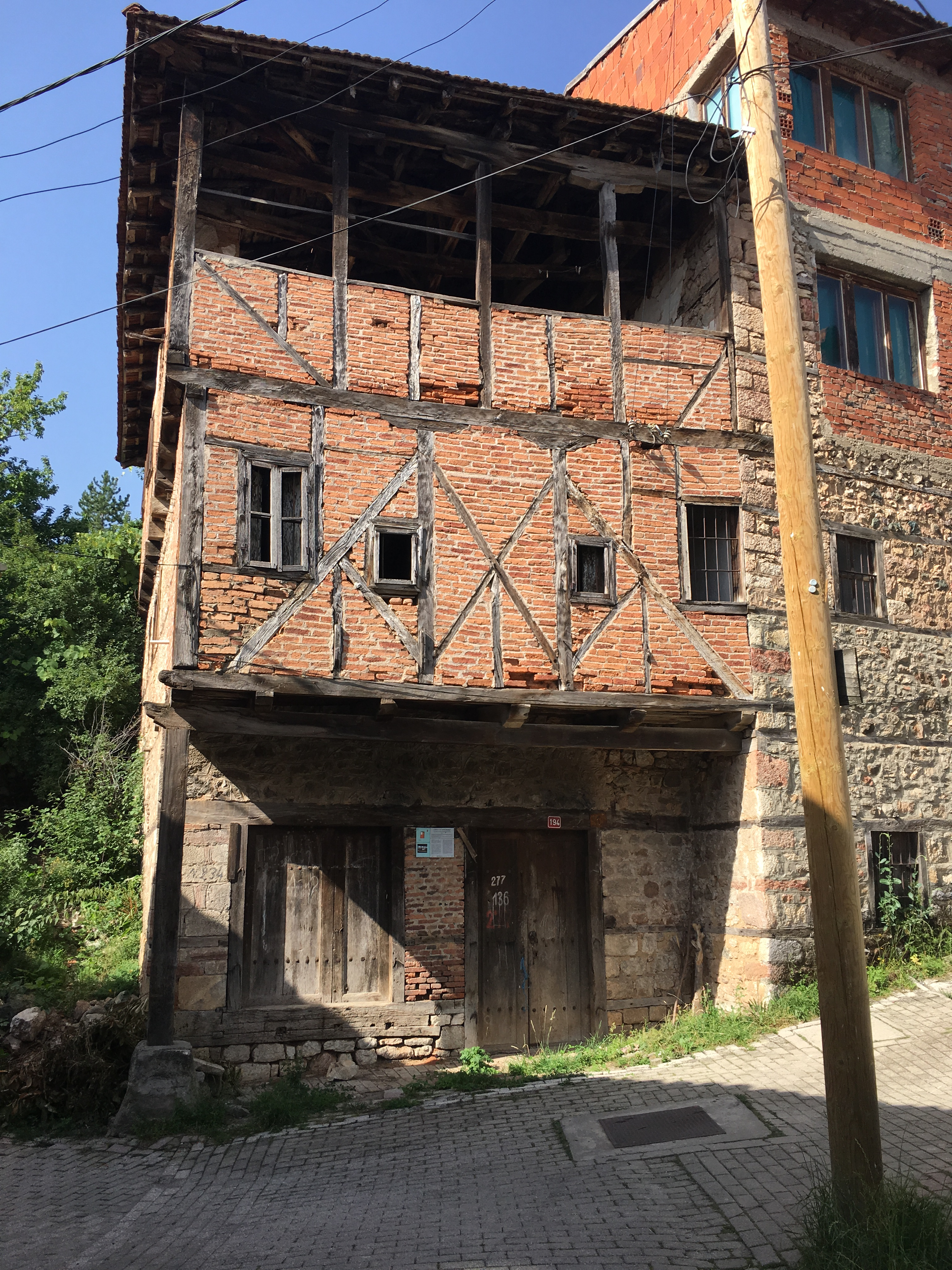
- The frontal view of the house
- Interactive map of the House of Kalajdžieski family area

General information
- Status: Monument of Culture
- Type: House
- Location: Vevčani, North Macedonia
- Construction started: 1881
- Completed: 1904
- Owner: Kalajdžieski family

Technical details
- Floor count: 3

The House of Kalajdžieski family, or House of Kalajdžievci is a house in the village of Vevčani, Vevčani Municipality, North Macedonia. The house belongs to the Kalajdžieski family and the building is registered as a Cultural Heritage of North Macedonia.

The house is located in the old part of Vevčani, in close proximity to the St. Nicholas Church.

== History ==
The Kalajdžieski family ― the owners of the house ― who were widely known traders, had a shop for gas for gas lighting, long pile blankets and food in this place.

At the end of the 19th century, a fire broke out in which the house burned down and members of the Kalajdzieski family died, trying to save part of the furniture. Due to the family's popularity, some Turkish individuals helped them financially to rebuild the house on the same foundation.

During World War II in Yugoslav Macedonia, the house was used to hide the partisans and to hold secret meetings.

== Architecture ==
The house of Kalajdžievci is a tall house with a narrow front, a spacious veranda at the front and a clearly differentiated summer-time apartment on the first floor made of light bundwerk construction and a winter-time apartment on a massive mezzanine.

== Gallery ==
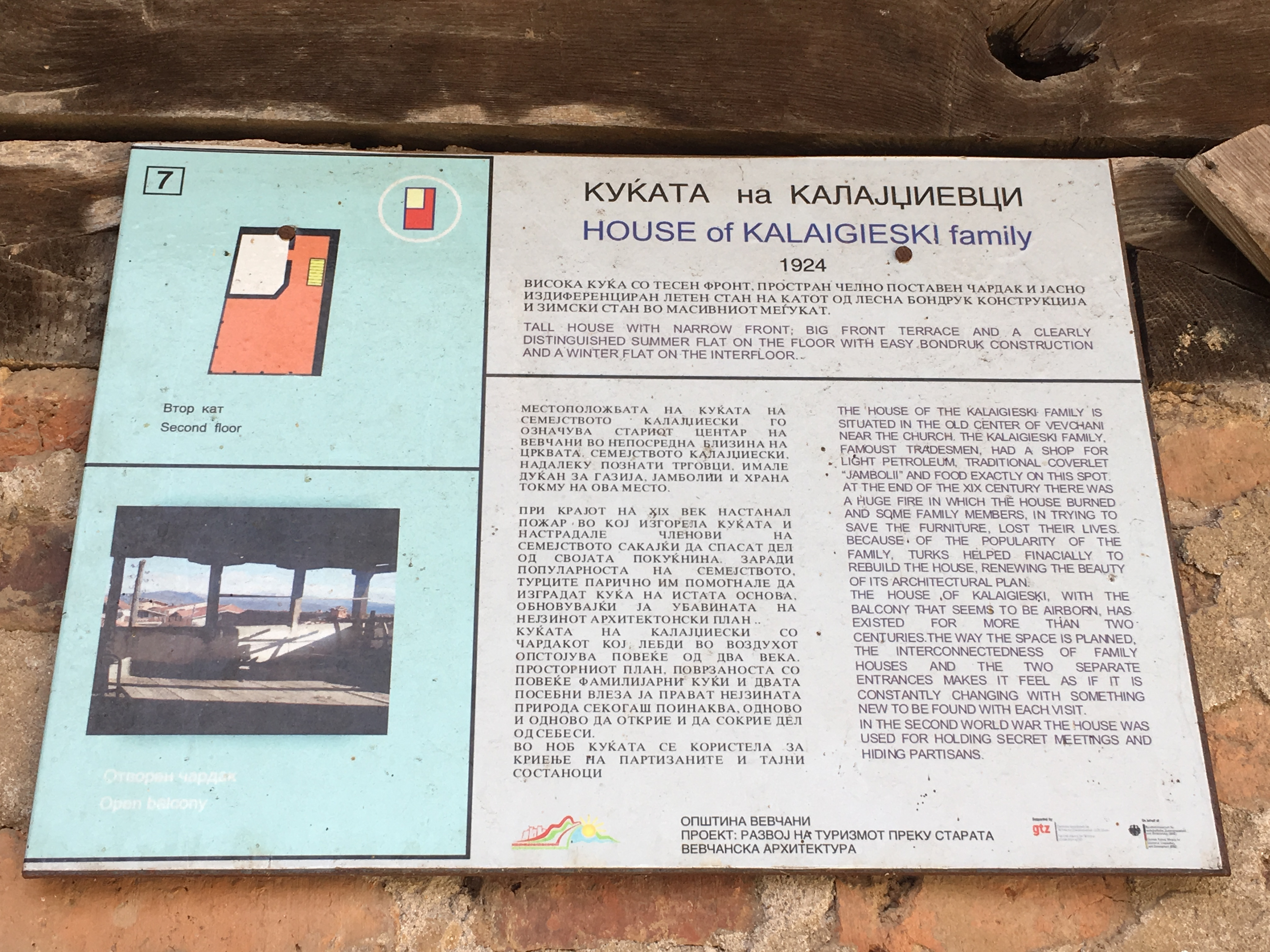
An informationаl plaque of the house

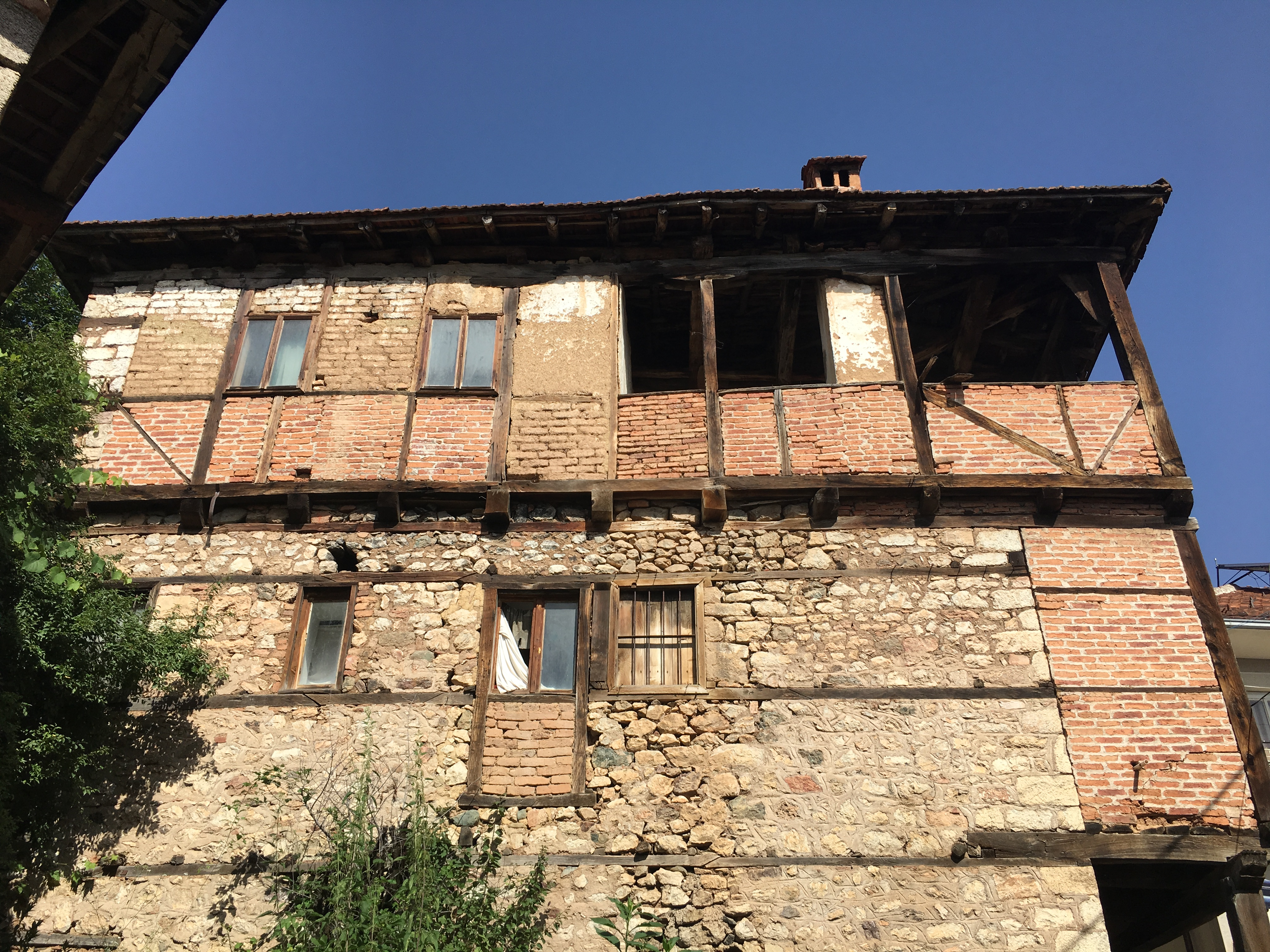
A northern view of the house

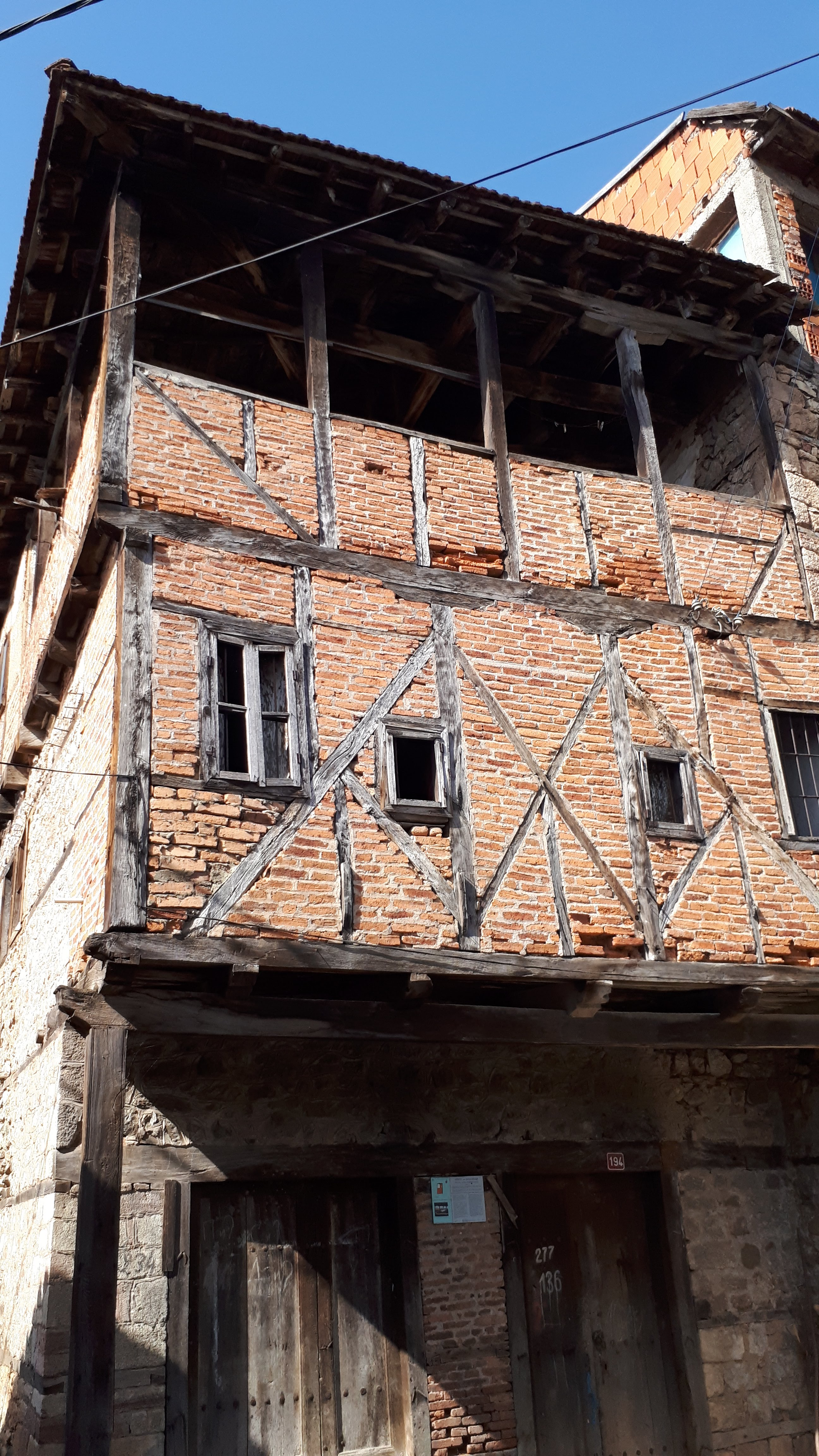
An eastern view of the house

== See also ==
- House of Kostojčinoski family - a cultural heritage site
- House of Duckinoski family - a cultural heritage site
- House of Korunoski family - a cultural heritage site
- House of Ḱitanoski family - a cultural heritage site
- House of Pešinoski family - a cultural heritage site
- House of Pluškoski family - a cultural heritage site
- House of Gogoski family - a cultural heritage site
- House of Daskaloski family - a cultural heritage site
- House of Poposki family - a cultural heritage site
- Kostojčinoski fulling mill and gristmill - a cultural heritage site
