= House of Duckinoski family =

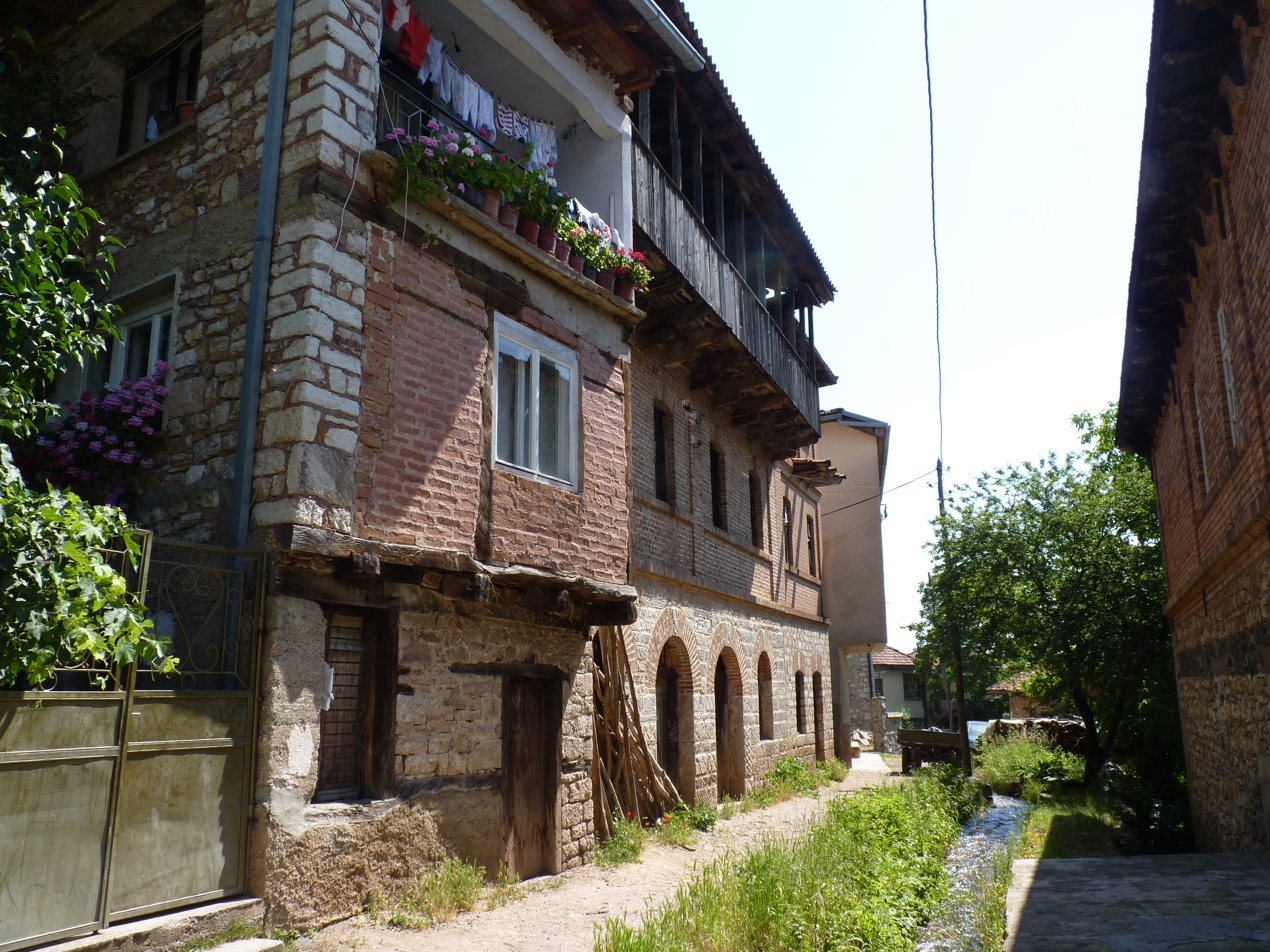
- The house (on the left, second in a row)
- Interactive map of the House of Duckinoski family area

General information
- Status: Monument of Culture
- Type: House
- Location: Vevčani, North Macedonia
- Completed: 1923 or 1929
- Client: Mitre Duckinoski
- Owner: Duckinoski family

Technical details
- Floor count: 3

The House of Duckinoski family, or House of Duckinovci is a house in the village of Vevčani, Vevčani Municipality, North Macedonia. The house belongs to the Duckinoski family and the building is registered as a Cultural Heritage of North Macedonia.

== History ==
The designer of the house is Vevčani native Mitre Duckinoski, who was a master builder and built it together with his family. It was built in 1923 or 1929 on the foundations of an older demolished house.

== Architecture ==
The house is considered to be a kind of palace. The stone for the construction of the first floor was brought from Gorna Belica and processed on site. There is a ground floor where the shops (grocery and butcher) were located, and the living room, guest rooms and bedrooms were on the upper floors. On the top floor is the garage, which was used for day care during the summer. The house is divided into three parts with a central veranda, On wooden beams bay windows are built with decoration characteristic of the area and a wooden fence. The ground floor is stone with brick decorations around the wooden windows that are closed with wooden shutters on the inside and metal grills on the outside. The entrance doors of the shops are wooden, with semicircular brick decoration in Medieval Roman style. The upper floors are made of solid brick with wooden windows, also with brick trim, and here are the living quarters. The mezzanine construction is made with beams of chestnut tree. The roof structure is made of the same material, and the roof itself is on two pitches. The staircase that connects the floors is made of chestnut, as well as all the interior doors.

== See also ==
- House of Korunoski family - a cultural heritage site
- House of Kostojčinoski family - a cultural heritage site
- House of Ḱitanoski family - a cultural heritage site
- House of Pešinoski family - a cultural heritage site
- House of Pluškoski family - a cultural heritage site
- House of Kalajdžieski family - a cultural heritage site
- House of Gogoski family - a cultural heritage site
- House of Daskaloski family - a cultural heritage site
- House of Poposki family - a cultural heritage site
- Kostojčinoski fulling mill and gristmill - a cultural heritage site
