= House of Kostojčinoski family =

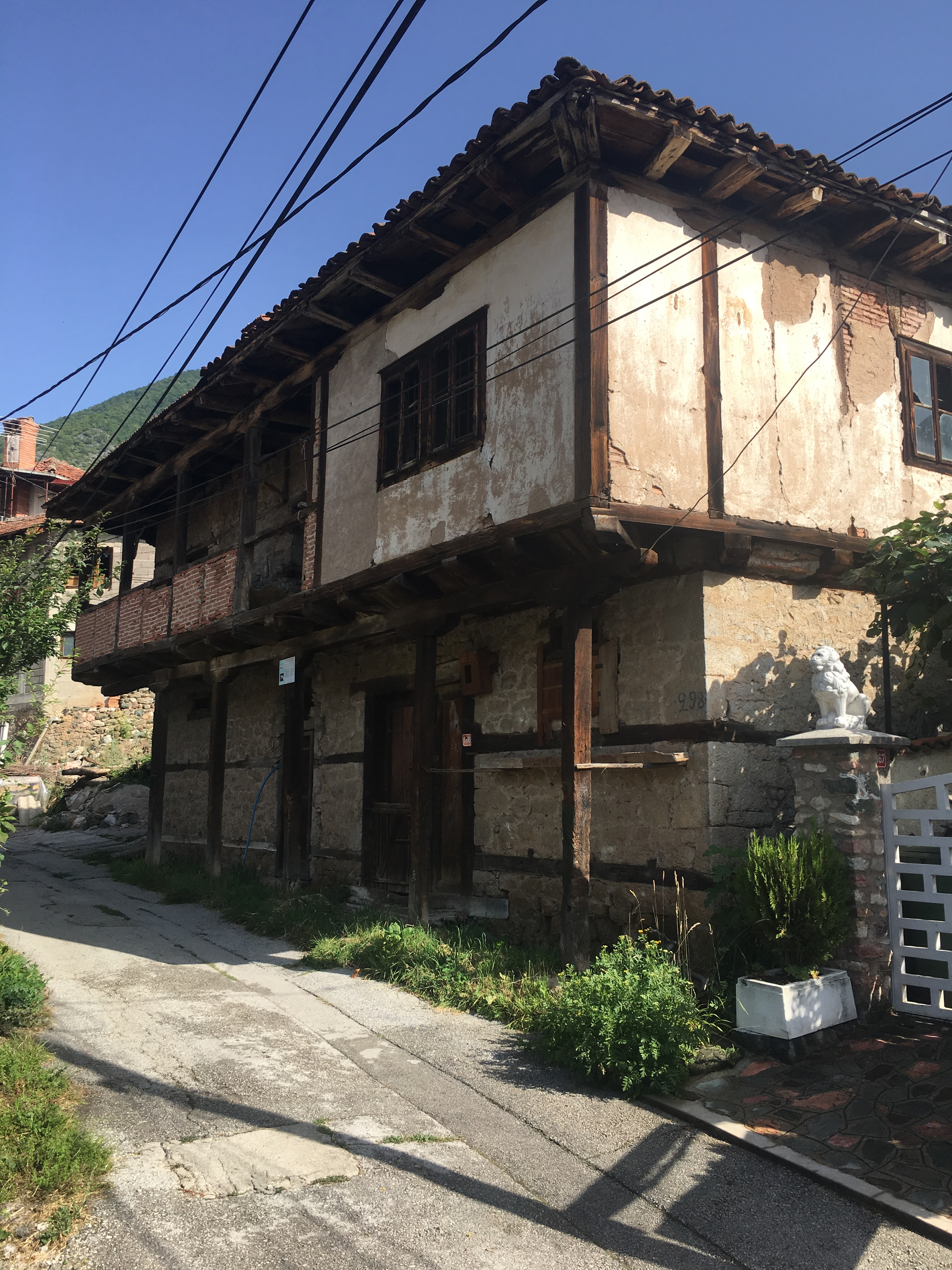
- A south-eastern view of the house
- Interactive map of the House of Kostojčinoski family area

General information
- Status: Monument of Culture
- Type: House
- Location: Vevčani, North Macedonia
- Construction started: 1880
- Completed: 1890
- Owner: Kostojčinoski family

Technical details
- Floor count: 2

The House of Kostojčinoski family, or House of Kostojčinovci is a house in the village of Vevčani, Vevčani Municipality, North Macedonia. The house belongs to the Kostojčinoski family and the building is registered as a Cultural Heritage of North Macedonia.

== History ==
The house belongs to the famous Vevčani family of masons, Kostojčinovci, who worked as migrant workers, mainly in Wallachia.

== Architecture ==
The house of Kostojčinoski is a small house with a colonnade of pillars and bay windows that circle the front part of the house, the lower part is in stone, and the upper part is of bundwerk construction.

== Gallery ==
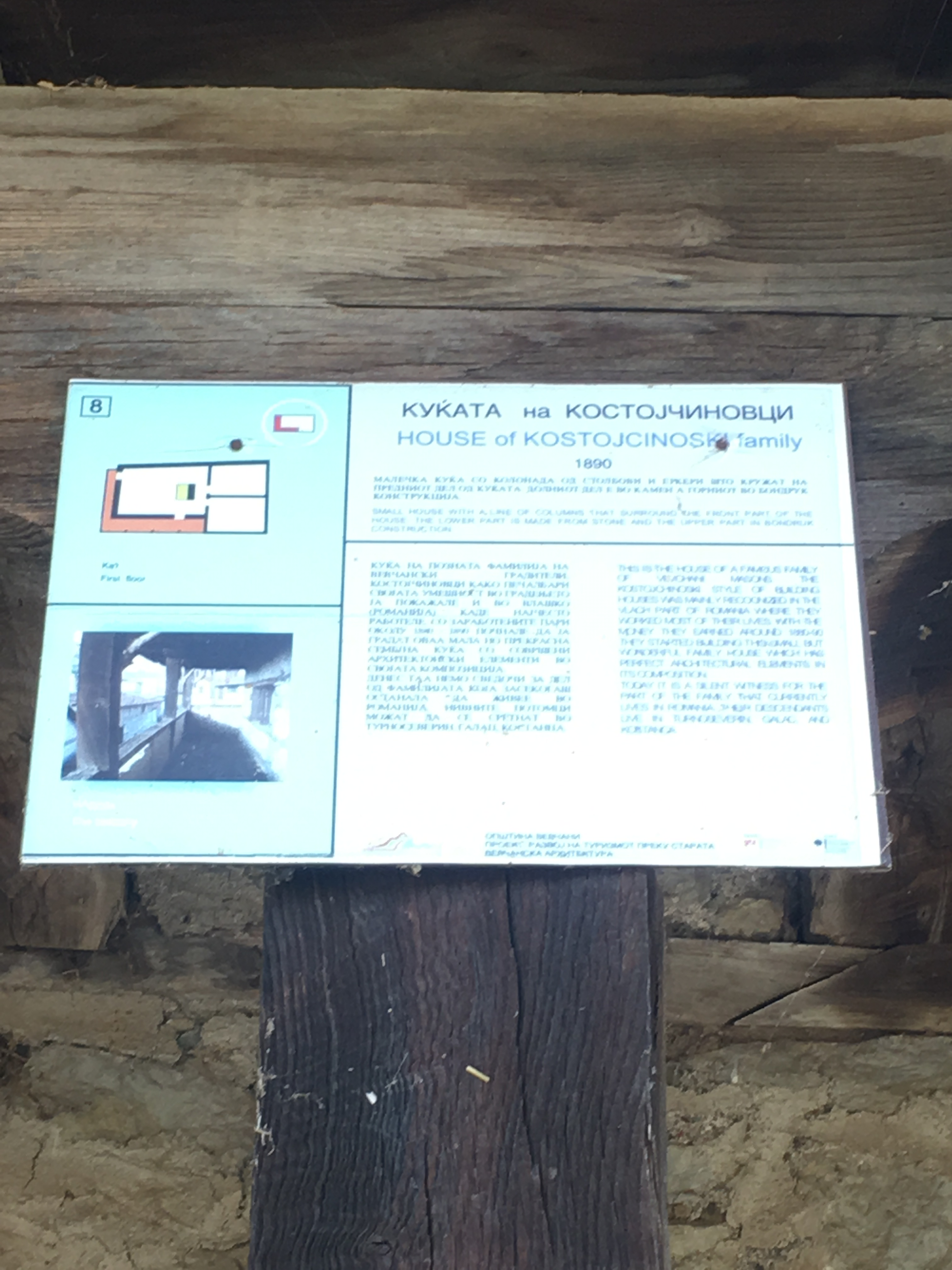
An informational plaque for the house

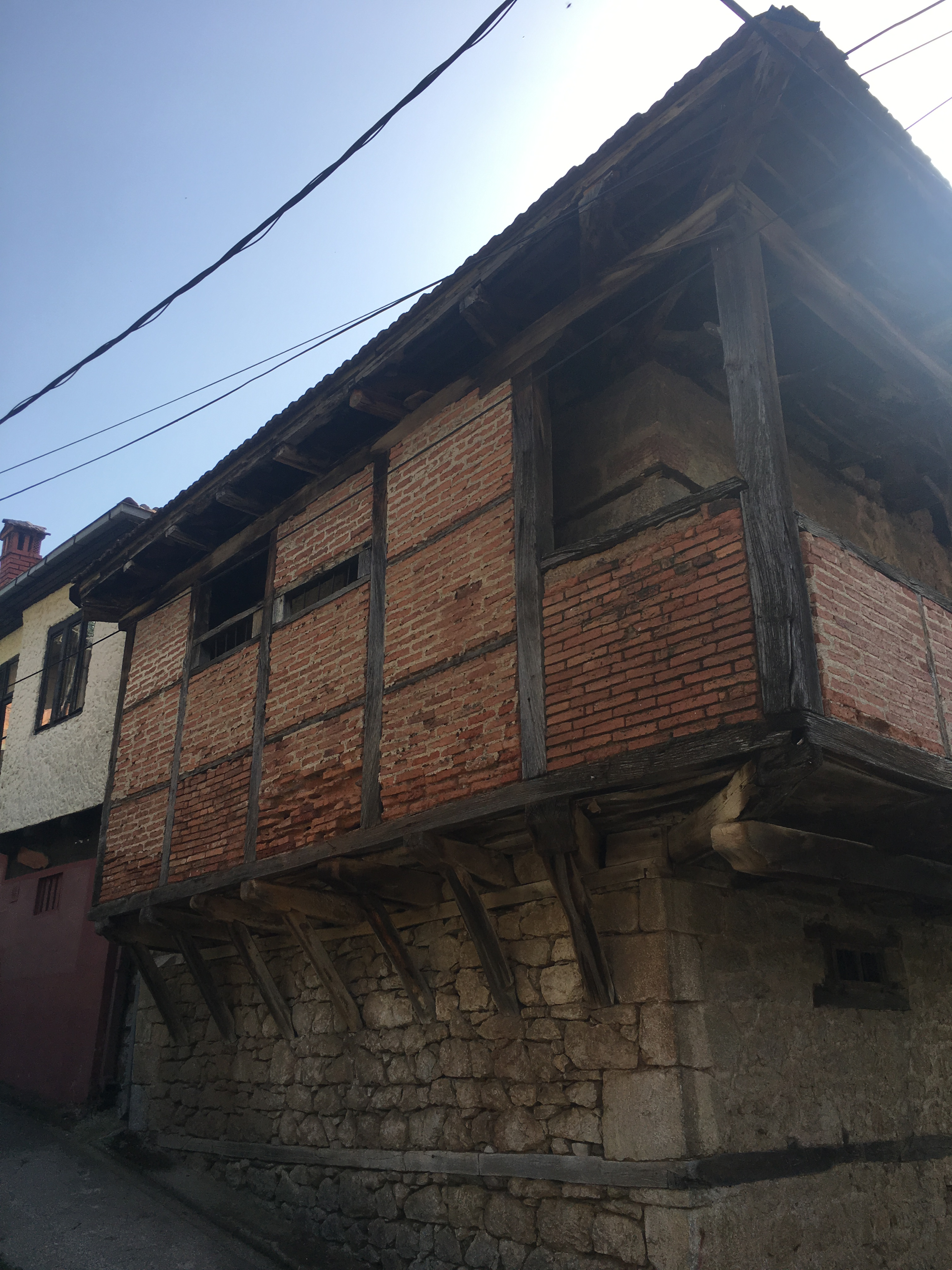
A western view of the house

== See also ==
- Kostojčinoski fulling mill and gristmill - a cultural heritage site
- House of Duckinoski family - a cultural heritage site
- House of Korunoski family - a cultural heritage site
- House of Ḱitanoski family - a cultural heritage site
- House of Pešinoski family - a cultural heritage site
- House of Pluškoski family - a cultural heritage site
- House of Kalajdžieski family - a cultural heritage site
- House of Gogoski family - a cultural heritage site
- House of Daskaloski family - a cultural heritage site
- House of Poposki family - a cultural heritage site
