= Kostojčinoski fulling mill and gristmill =

- Interactive map of the Kostojčinoski fulling mill and gristmill area

General information
- Status: Cultural Heritage of North Macedonia
- Type: Fulling mill and gristmill
- Location: Vevčani, North Macedonia
- Construction started: 1940 (the gristmill)
- Completed: Beginning of the 20th century (the fulling mill); 1941 (the gristmill)
- Client: Boris Kostojčinoski (the gristmill)
- Owner: Kostojčinoski family

Technical details
- Floor count: 1

The Kostojčinoski fulling mill and gristmill is a fulling mill and gristmill in the village of Vevčani, Vevčani Municipality, North Macedonia. The site belongs to the Kostojčinoski family and the complex is registered as a Cultural Heritage of North Macedonia.

== Description ==
=== General description ===
The complex consists of a water-based fulling mill (Macedonian: вир, vir), a dry-based fulling mill (Macedonian: валавица, valavica) and a water-based gristmill (Macedonian: воденица, vodenica). All of them receive water from the Vevčanska River and for each building there is a separate trough for the inflow of water. The troughs are actually hollowed out trunks with an open or covered top and the water flows through them. The old original troughs have been preserved. To regulate the water, there is an obstacle called gječme, which regulates the inflow, that is, the amount of water for the needs of the work of the water-powered fulling mill and the gristmill. The water-powered and dry-based fulling mill operated actively until the 1970s/80s, while the gristmill continued to operate.

=== Water-based fulling mill ===
On the initiative of the owner Marjan Kostojčinoski, with his funds and funds from the Ministry of Environment, the water-based fulling mill was completely restored in 2007. It was rebuilt after the example of the old one which was in a very ruined condition. It has the appearance of an inverted cone. The opening in the ground is lined with stones – dry masonry and is called džis. Here, sticks are arranged in a circle next to each other, tightened with wooden hoops, fastened in the lower part, and in the upper part rounded and with elliptical recesses for water drainage. The depth of the whirlpool is about 2.70 meters. Nowadays, as in the past, it is used for washing woolen fabrics, most commonly long pile blankets. Long wooden forks were used for spinning the fabrics, and for hanging and drying the fabrics – pegs called kljukači.

=== Dry-based fulling mill ===
The dry-based fulling mill (in local Macedonian: валајца, valajca) or as well as the water-based fulling mill was built at the beginning of the 20th century. In the beginning of the 2010s, it was in the phase of restoration. The drive part is original and consists of a spindle and on it pegs with fins called kutlici, all made of wood. This part is in a very bad condition and needs to be restored. The interior processing section goes under the owners' house and has been almost entirely restored. Foams are made of wood (in the form of large jagged hammers) that are hung on the part called the old man with the help of beams that are also called needles. There is also a part made of boards called plešti and the lower part is also made of boards – a chest where the folded wool fabric is placed for finishing, i.e. rolling with constant soaking of the fabrics with cold water. The reconstruction was made according to the example of the valavici in the village of Virovo, Demir Hisar Municipality, that is, of the type of dry-based fulling mills with a starec, and not with a loom which was probably more characteristic of this region. Since 2007, restoration has been started. It remained to make a new one or to preserve and rebuild the outer part: the spindle, the peg, the balls and the metal part on which the spindle turns. The dry-based fulling mill was used for finishing the woolen klašna, that is, for refining the coarse woolen fabrics. With the help of the action of water they were washed, dirt and excess grease was removed. The wool fibers spread out, the base is no longer known and the fabric becomes thick, but at the same time it acquires softness, elasticity, even shine.

=== Water-based grist mill ===
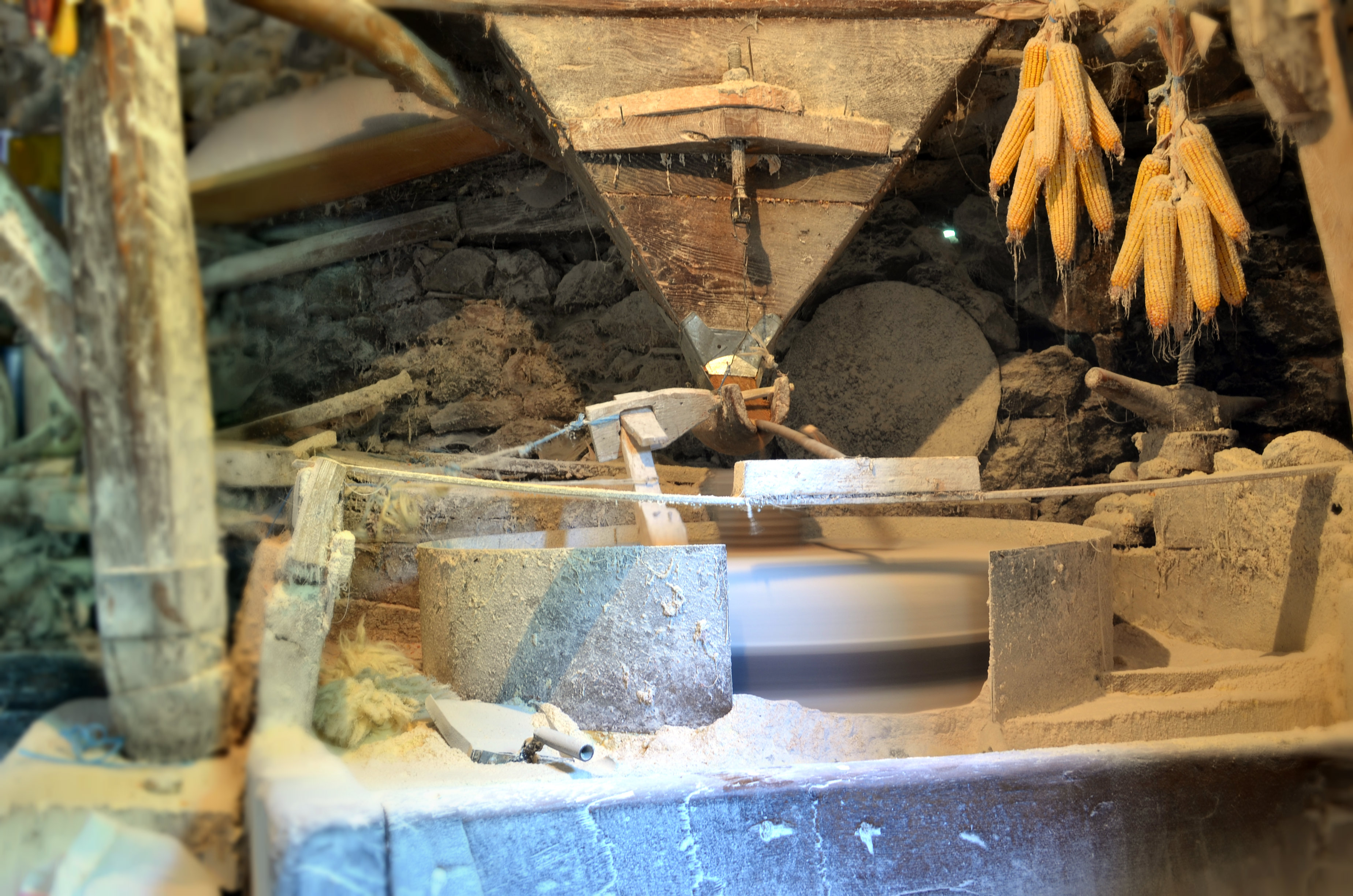
The grist mill.

The water-based grist mill was built by Boris Kostojčinoski in 1940–1941. It is built of stone and covered with tiles. The outer wall part was restored due to damage in 2007–2008. It consists of a drive and processing part. Water receives through a special trough which is narrowed at the end and is called a siphon. The stake is wooden and there are fins on it. It turns the spindle, and to stop the work of the mill, that is, on the water, there is a long wooden part called stavyalo. The inner processing part has been preserved with all the original parts: a wooden basket for placing the grain for grinding, a pestle that shakes the grain falling into the grinding stone, upper and lower millstones for grinding the grain, an old man for regulating the work on the stones, a floor of wooden boards where the flour falls, kutlica – a shovel for scooping out grain or flour. The mill continues to work today, but on a smaller scale – it grinds grain for flour or fodder for goods but only for closer people.

== See also ==
=== Cultural heritage sites ===
- House of Duckinoski family
- House of Korunoski family
- House of Kostojčinoski family
- House of Ḱitanoski family
- House of Pešinoski family
- House of Pluškoski family
- House of Kalajdžieski family
- House of Gogoski family
- House of Daskaloski family
- House of Poposki family
