= House of Korunoski family =

- Interactive map of the House of Korunoski family area

General information
- Status: Monument of Culture
- Type: House
- Location: Vevčani, North Macedonia
- Completed: 1924
- Client: Stojan Korunoski
- Owner: Korunoski family

Technical details
- Floor count: 2

The House of Korunoski family, or House of Korunovci is a house in the village of Vevčani, Vevčani Municipality, North Macedonia. The house belongs to the Korunoski family and the building is registered as a Cultural Heritage of North Macedonia.

== History ==
The designer of the house is Vevčani native Stojan Korunoski, who worked for a long time in Romania and followed the development of architecture there. The mayor of Turnu Severin was strongly inclined towards him and decided to award him the project for the entrance portal of the town hall. After the portal began to undergo changes, Korunoski decided to realize his idea in his home place Vevčani. He made a detailed plan and sent it to his relatives in Vevčani for construction. The house was built in 1924.

== Architecture ==
The house is divided into three parts with a central porch and a specific stylistic treatment that is associated with Macedonian medieval churches. The building is built from natural materials (wood, stone and solid brick) and has a ground floor and a first floor. On one part of it, on the eastern side, there are basement rooms with an entrance on the southern side. The floors are built of solid brick, except on the north side, which is brick dressing over wooden windows where the floor is of stone. The sitting porch on the south side of the first floor is richly decorated with solid brickwork typical of medieval churches in Macedonia and has an ornate cornice under the eaves. The roof structure is made of chestnut wood with a multi-gable roof. The mezzanine construction is also made of chestnut wood. The pillars that connect the ground floor and the first floor are also chestnut, and the same applies to all the interior doors.

== See also ==
- House of Duckinoski family – a cultural heritage site
- House of Kostojčinoski family – a cultural heritage site
- House of Ḱitanoski family – a cultural heritage site
- House of Pešinoski family – a cultural heritage site
- House of Pluškoski family – a cultural heritage site
- House of Kalajdžieski family – a cultural heritage site
- House of Gogoski family – a cultural heritage site
- House of Daskaloski family – a cultural heritage site
- House of Poposki family – a cultural heritage site
- Kostojčinoski fulling mill and gristmill – a cultural heritage site
