= House of Pešinoski family =

- Interactive map of the House of Pešinoski family area

General information
- Status: Monument of Culture
- Type: House
- Location: Vevčani, North Macedonia
- Completed: 1927
- Owner: Pešinoski family

Technical details
- Floor count: 3

The House of Pešinoski family, or House of Pešinovci is a house in the village of Vevčani, Vevčani Municipality, North Macedonia. The house belongs to the Pešinoski family and the building is registered as a Cultural Heritage of North Macedonia.

== History ==
The house was built in 1927 year before the old House of Pluškoski family from the XVIII-XIX century, which forms an architectural complex.

== Architecture ==
The building is a tall house with a ground floor and two upper floors. It contains a two-level porch and a double central veranda with a distinctly differentiated winter apartment in the mezzanine and summer apartment on the first floor. The first (ground) floor and the second floor are made of stone, leveled with wooden sashes in dry masonry. There are brick decorations above the first floor windows. The third floor to the east and west is of stone, and the rest of the walls are of solid brick. Above the wooden windows there is an arched brick decoration. The mezzanine construction is made with beams of chestnut wood. The roof is multi-pitched, it is also made of chestnut beams, with tiles on a canvas of boards. The wooden roof structural beams, which form the eaves, end with decorations. The internal doors, floors, as well as the mezzanine pillar are made of chestnut wood.

== See also ==
- House of Kostojčinoski family – a cultural heritage site
- House of Duckinoski family – a cultural heritage site
- House of Korunoski family – a cultural heritage site
- House of Ḱitanoski family – a cultural heritage site
- House of Pluškoski family – a cultural heritage site
- House of Kalajdžieski family – a cultural heritage site
- House of Gogoski family – a cultural heritage site
- House of Daskaloski family – a cultural heritage site
- House of Poposki family – a cultural heritage site
- Kostojčinoski fulling mill and gristmill – a cultural heritage site
