= House of Gogoski family =

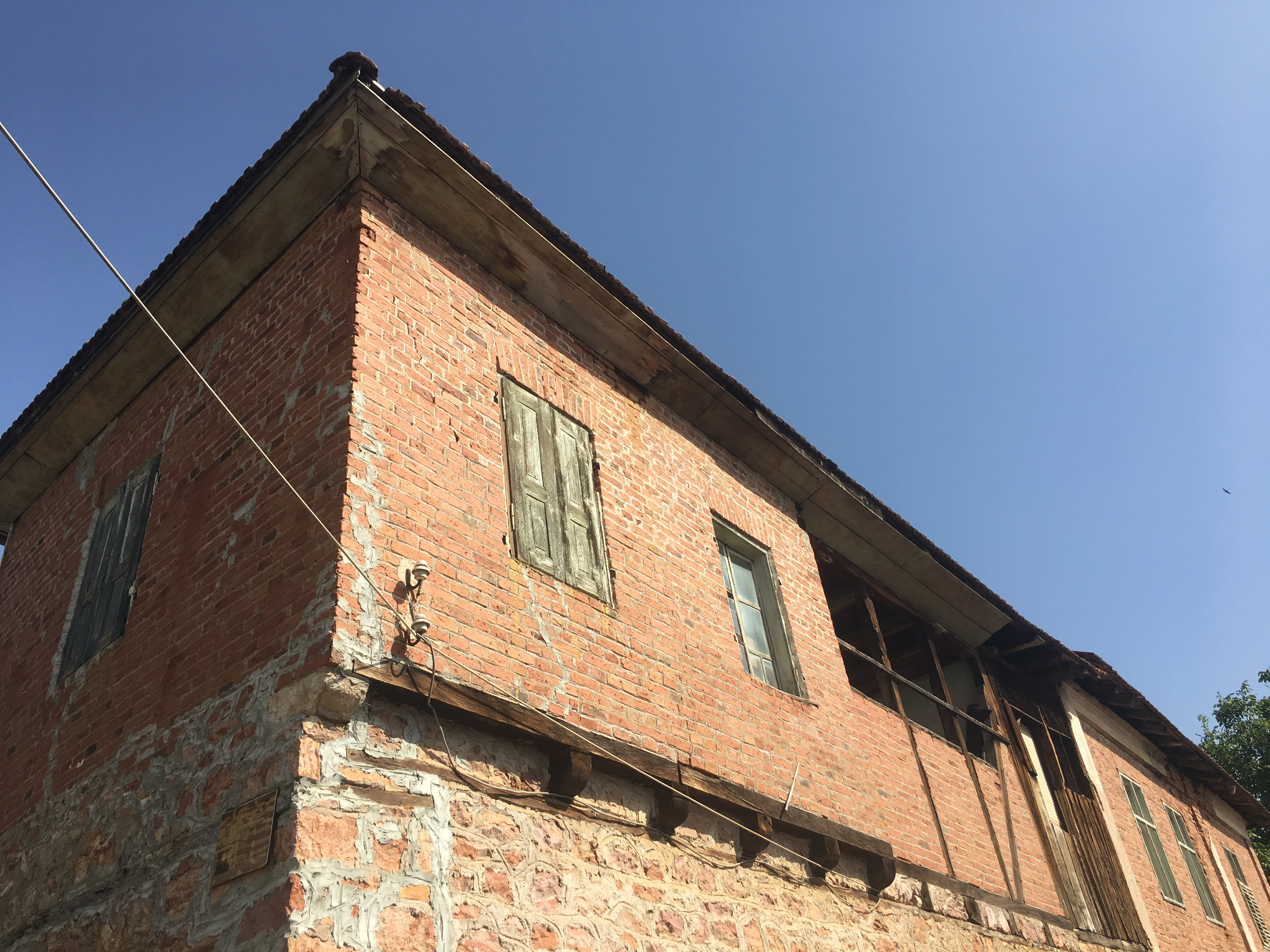
- A south-eastern view of the house
- Interactive map of the House of Gogoski family area

General information
- Status: Cultural Heritage of North Macedonia
- Type: House
- Location: Vevčani, North Macedonia
- Completed: 1887
- Client: Kuzman Gogov (expansion of the house)
- Owner: Gogoski family

Technical details
- Floor count: 2

The House of Gogoski family, or House of Gogovci is a house in the village of Vevčani, Vevčani Municipality, North Macedonia. The house belongs to the Gogoski family and the building is registered as a Cultural Heritage of North Macedonia.

== History ==
The house was built in 1887. In the following decades, the house was expanded by the influential Vevčani native merchant Kuzman Gogov. In the period 1928–1932, Gogov was mayor of Vevčani and with his organizational skills he contributed a lot to the development of the village by building a hospital, paving the streets, building the Belo Džade (lit. White Road), as well as road to the Ascension of Christ Church.

== Architecture ==
The building has a distinctive architecture, including the existing old house. It consists of a first (ground) floor and a second floor, and is a house with a double-oriented central veranda. Both floors to the northeast are built of stone with leveled wooden beams. Part of the ground floor was an open porch, and the rest contained business premises. The mezzanine and roof construction were made of chestnut wood. The stairs that connected the ground floor and the second floor, as well as all the doors and floors are also made of chestnut wood. The second floor is sticks out with a bay window to the southeast and contains a light wooden structure filled with whole bricks. Above the wooden windows there is a brick ornament. The south-eastern and north-western facades, which have a half-enclosed stone loggia with whole bricks, which extends over the street and the courtyard, stood out in particular. The roof is of roof tiles laid over jointed boards.

== See also ==
- House of Kostojčinoski family - a cultural heritage site
- House of Duckinoski family - a cultural heritage site
- House of Korunoski family - a cultural heritage site
- House of Ḱitanoski family - a cultural heritage site
- House of Pešinoski family - a cultural heritage site
- House of Pluškoski family - a cultural heritage site
- House of Kalajdžieski family - a cultural heritage site
- House of Daskaloski family - a cultural heritage site
- House of Poposki family - a cultural heritage site
- Kostojčinoski fulling mill and gristmill - a cultural heritage site
