= House of Ḱitanoski family =

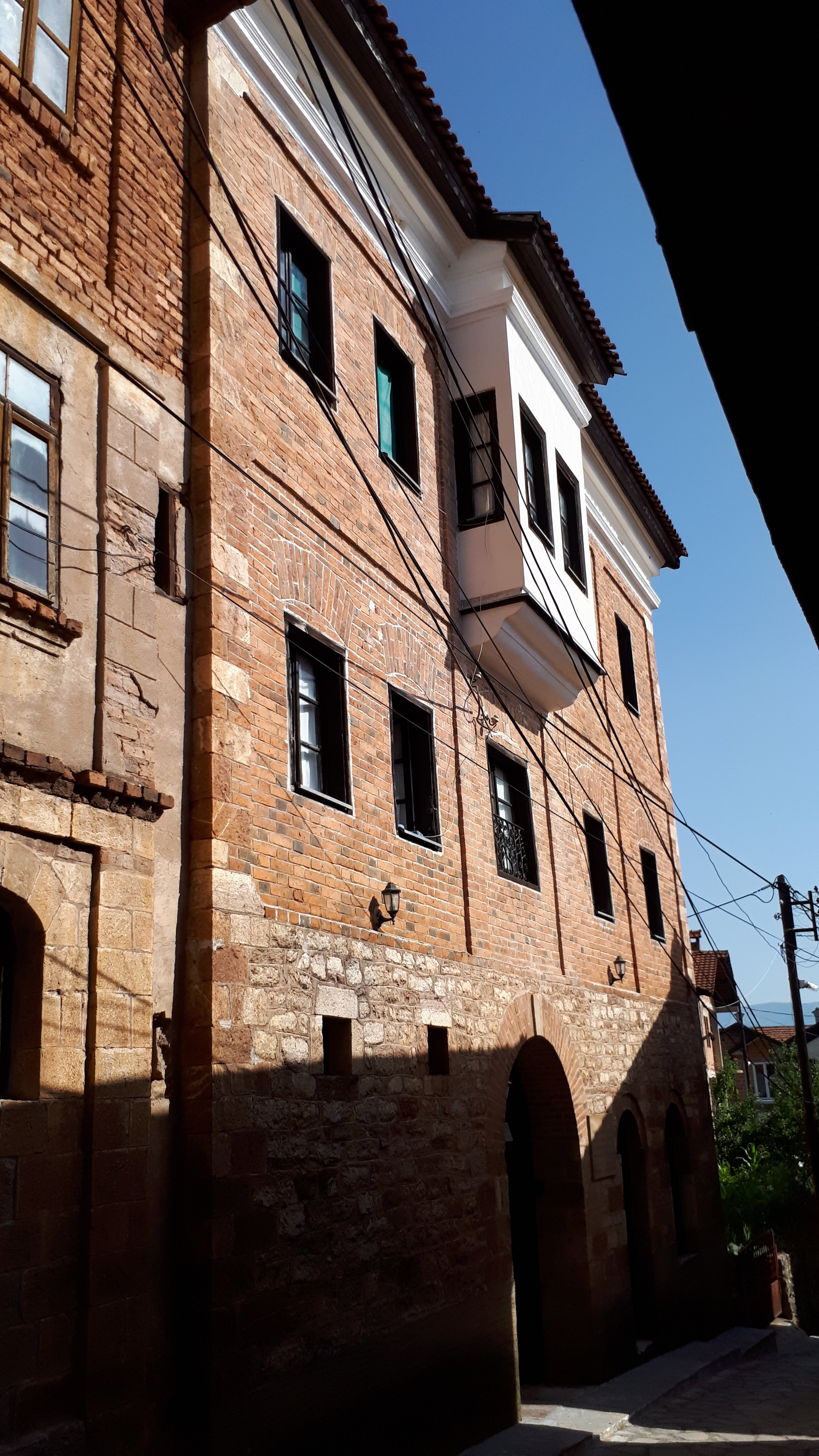
- Interactive map of the House of Ḱitanoski family area

General information
- Status: Cultural Heritage of North Macedonia
- Type: House
- Location: Vevčani, North Macedonia
- Construction started: 1904
- Completed: 1906
- Owner: Ḱitanoski family

Technical details
- Floor count: 3

The House of Ḱitanoski family, or House of Ḱitanovci is a house in the village of Vevčani, Vevčani Municipality, North Macedonia. The house belongs to the Ḱitanoski family and the building is registered as a Cultural Heritage of North Macedonia.

== History ==
Andre Kitanoski started building the house, who bought the lot in 1898, and the foundation stone was laid in the spring of 1904. The ceremony was attended by the valija of Ohrid and the çavuş with about twenty soldiers. The house was completed in 1906. About 2,500 cubic meters of stone have been incorporated into the entire building (the house, the courtyards, the premises for the goods and the economy, the barn, the hut and the walling of the gap and the entire space). During the construction period, 25 workers were constantly hired, and beams and other material were brought from the Jablanica Mountain. The stone, which was carved by the famous masters of masonry from the Drimkol region, was paid for in gold. There was also a family guardhouse, to guard the children and women from the Arnaut (Albanian) gangs, whose targets of attacks were rich migrant working families.

In 1941, part of the property of the house was confiscated by the Albanian authorities. Later, the partisan radio station was also located here. During the National Liberation Struggle, in 1944 the first meeting of the NLB for the Greater Struga Region was held in the house. The first People's Board of the Struga District was established in it. As a sign of merit, on August 2, 1954, a memorial plaque was unveiled on the house.

== Architecture ==
The house of Ḱitanovci is a highly developed house with a three-part division of the base and a centrally placed chardak. The Icon-protector of the house is the Mother of God, brought from Odesa, which was embedded in one of the walls, in the presence of three Orthodox priests.

The furniture in the house was brought from European centers, and all the income that the family earned from the restaurant on the coast of the Black Sea, was directed to building the house in the highest style.

== Notable people ==
People who lived in the house

- Misho Kitanoski - publicist and chronicler of Vevčani

People who stayed in the house

- Kuzman Josifovski Pitu and Vlado Maleski stayed during World War II

== The house mentioned in art ==
The first Macedonian-Romanian dictionary with 87 words was made in this house. The house is mentioned in the poems U Kitanoj (Macedonian: У Китаној, lit. In the Kitan's (house)) by Sašo Betoski, and Kuḱata vevčanska kitanoska (Куќата вевчанска китаноска, lit. The Kitanoski's Vevčani House) by Vasil Mukaetov.

== Gallery ==
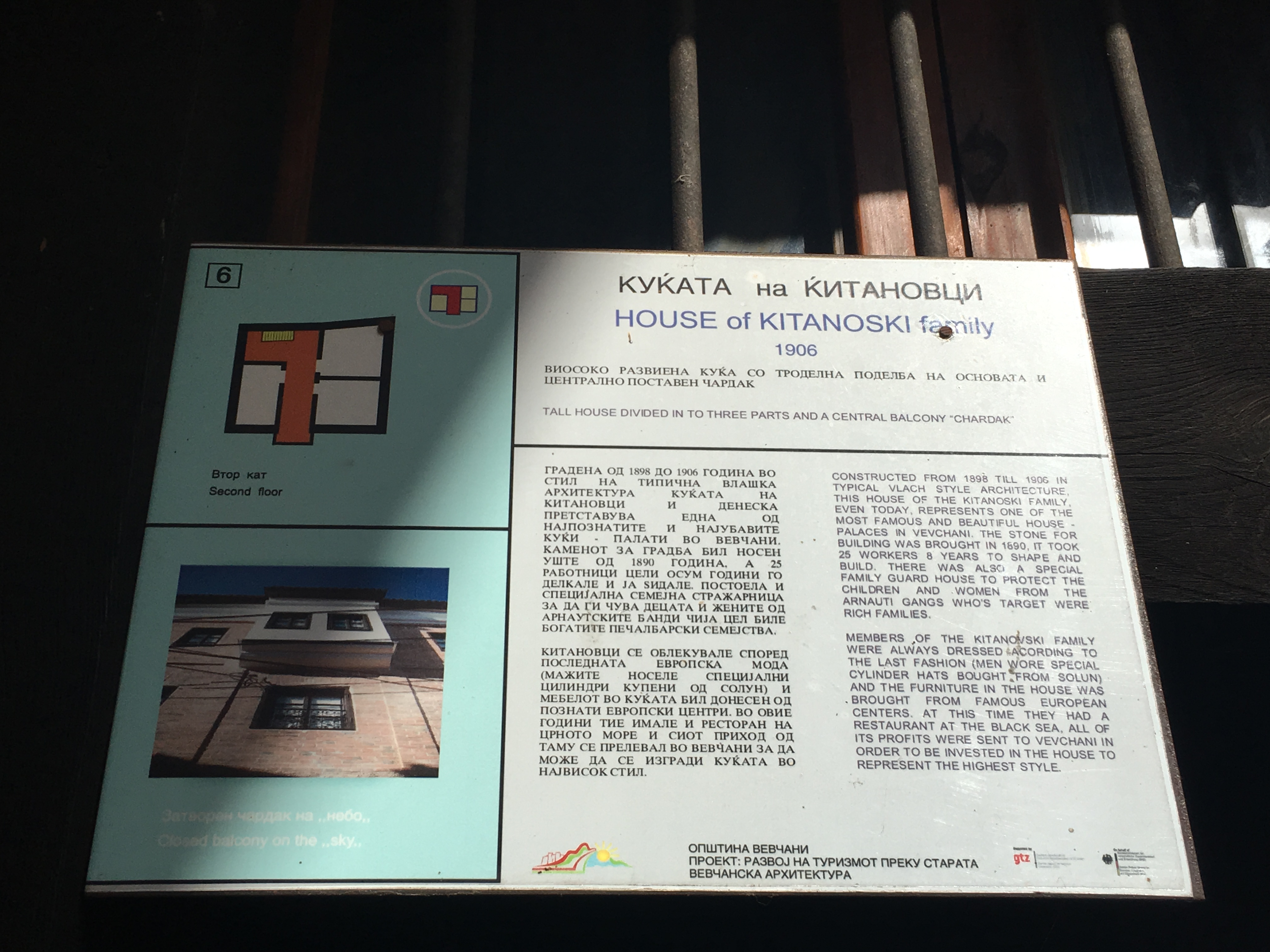
An informational plaque of the house

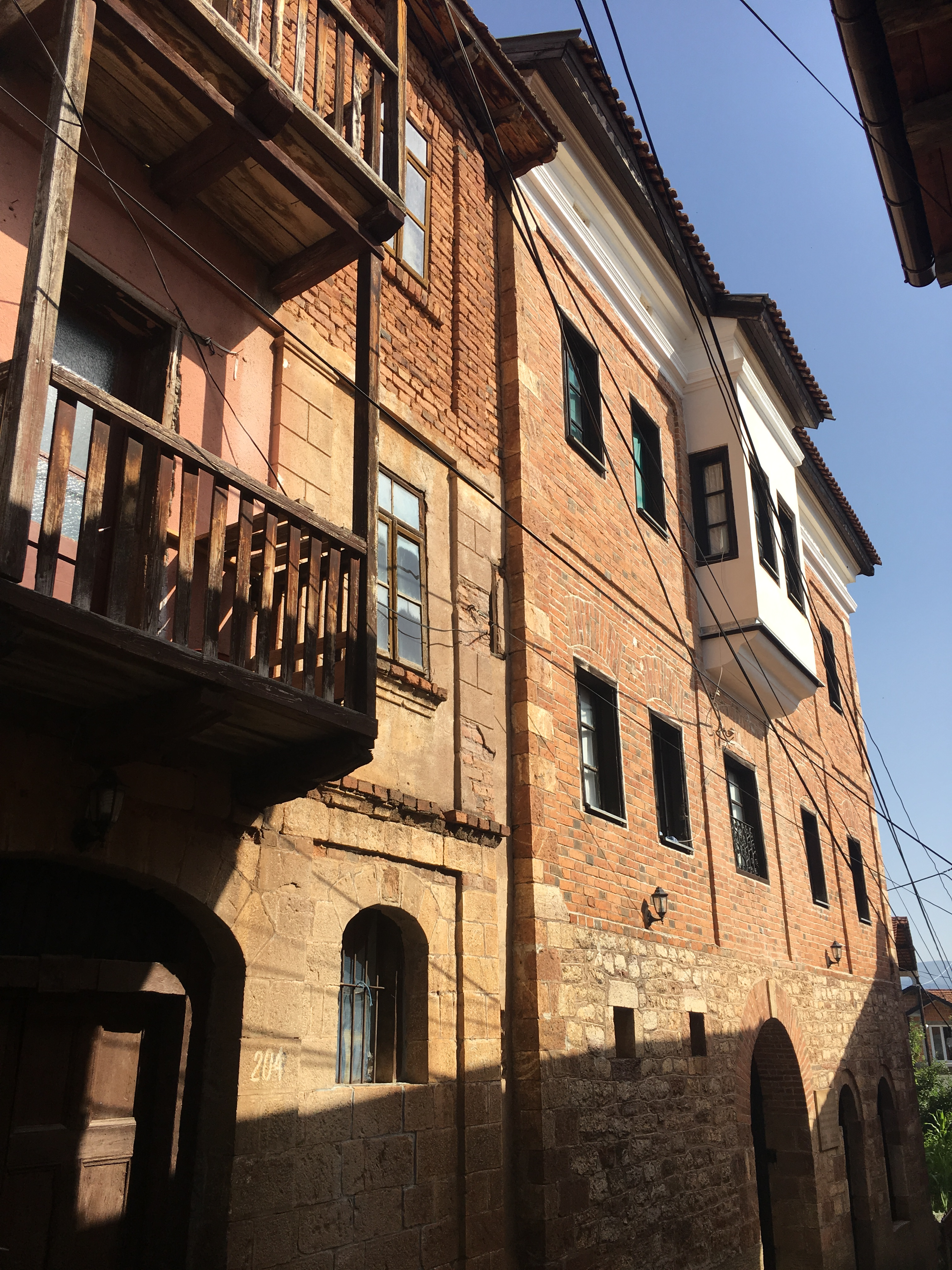
View of the house

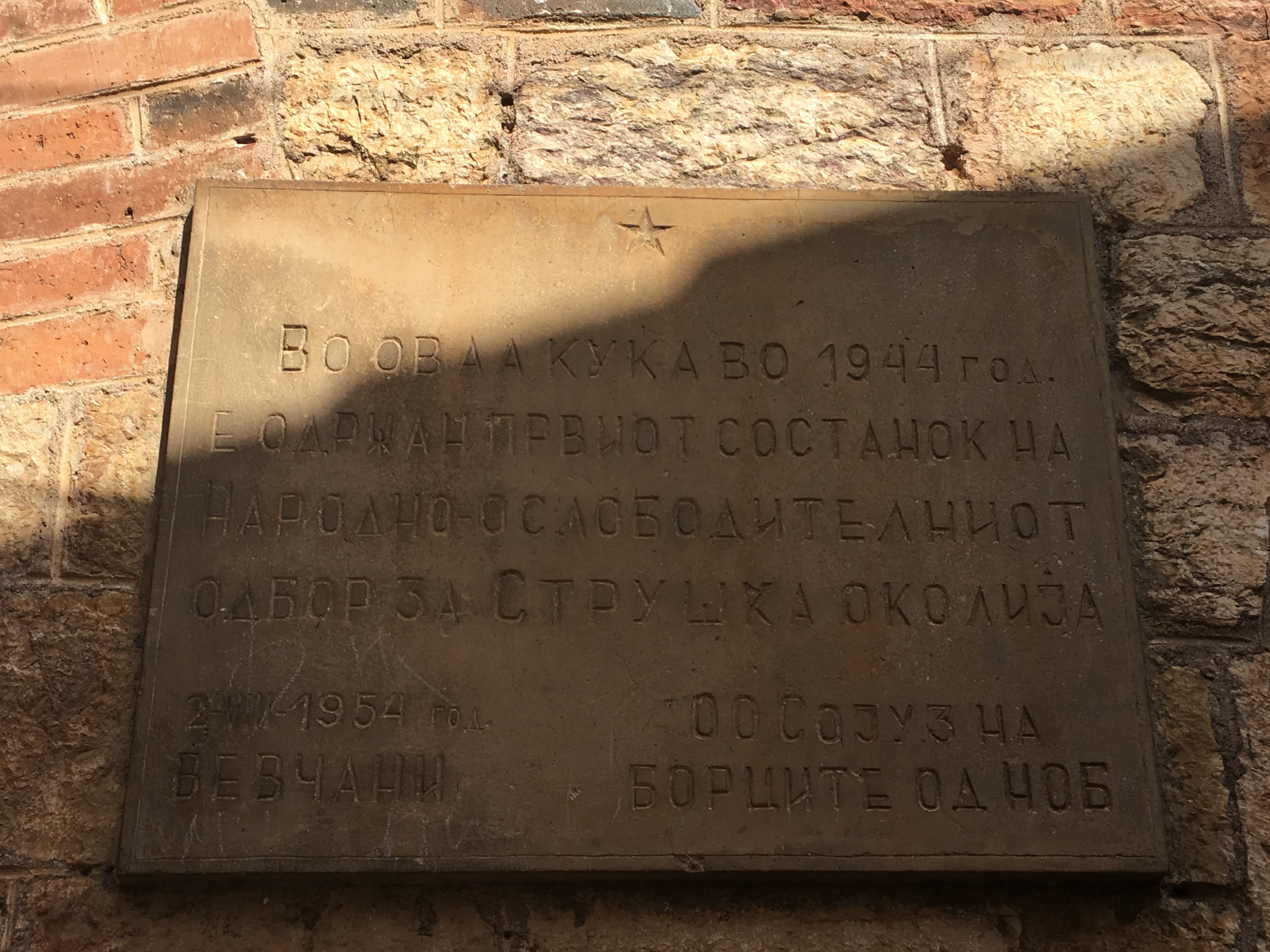
A memorial-plaque dedicated to the NLS meeting

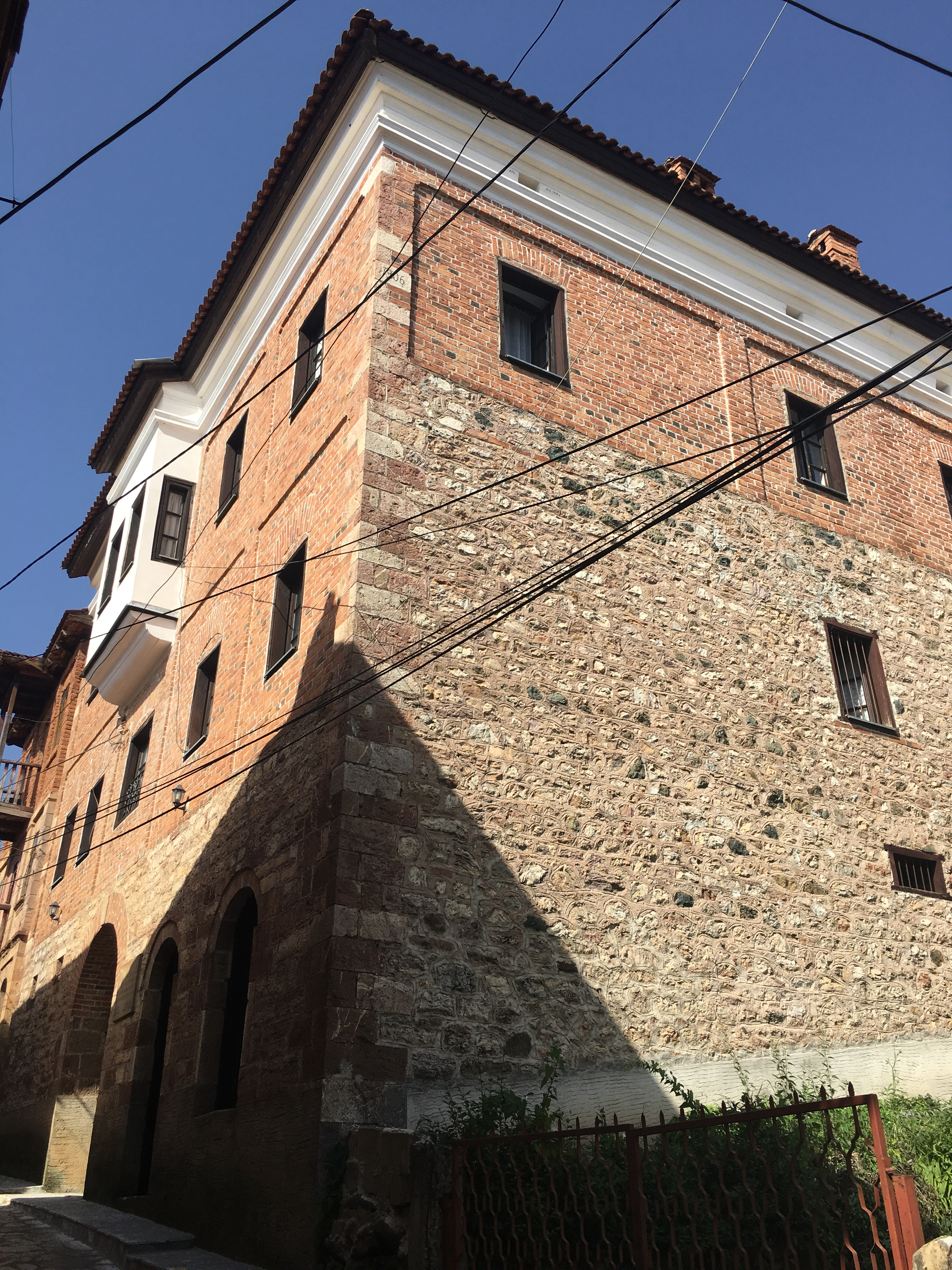
View of the house

== See also ==
- House of Kostojčinoski family - a cultural heritage site
- House of Duckinoski family - a cultural heritage site
- House of Korunoski family - a cultural heritage site
- House of Pešinoski family - a cultural heritage site
- House of Pluškoski family - a cultural heritage site
- House of Kalajdžieski family - a cultural heritage site
- House of Gogoski family - a cultural heritage site
- House of Daskaloski family - a cultural heritage site
- House of Poposki family - a cultural heritage site
- Kostojčinoski fulling mill and gristmill - a cultural heritage site
