= House of Poposki family =

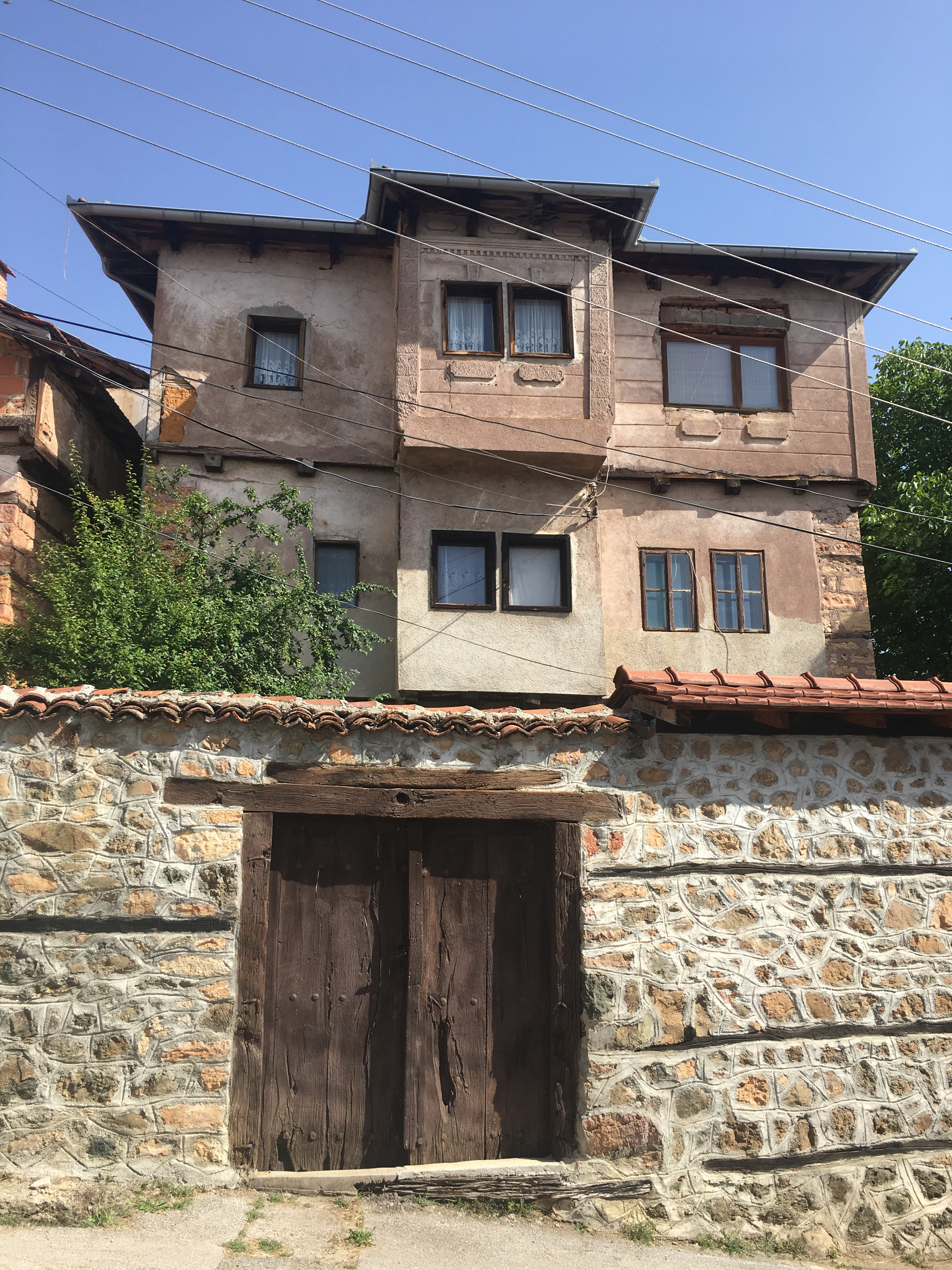
- Frontal view of the house
- Interactive map of the House of Poposki family area

General information
- Status: Cultural Heritage of North Macedonia
- Type: House
- Location: Vevčani, Republic of North Macedonia
- Owner: Poposki family

Technical details
- Floor count: 2

The House of Poposki family, or House of Popovci is a house in the village of Vevčani, Vevčani Municipality, North Macedonia. The house belongs to the Poposki family and the building is registered as a Cultural Heritage of North Macedonia.

== Architecture ==
The house of Popovci is a house with high architectural and structural expression with a characteristic and specific typology.

== Gallery ==
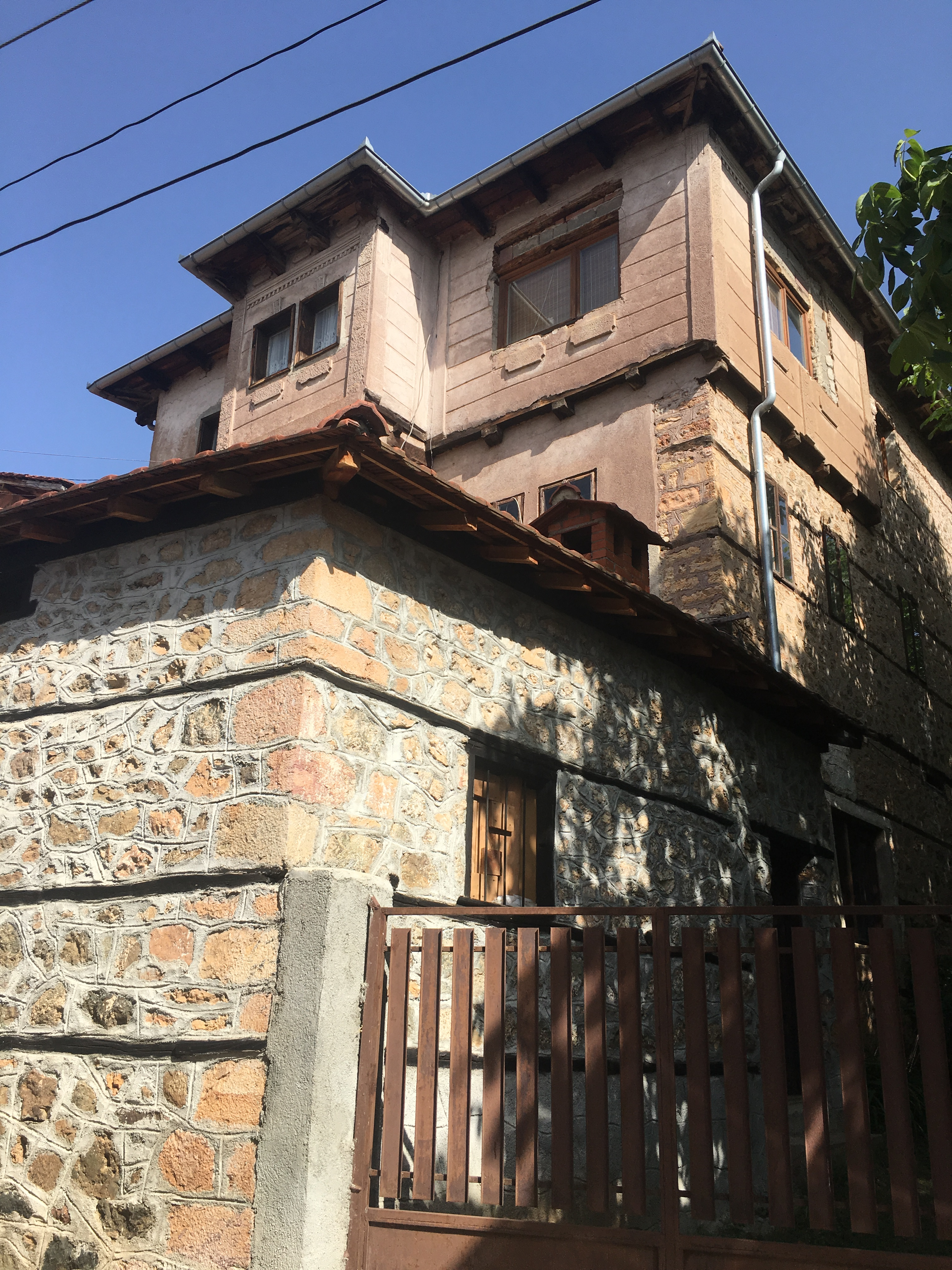
A south-eastern view of the house

== See also ==
- House of Kostojčinoski family - a cultural heritage site
- House of Duckinoski family - a cultural heritage site
- House of Korunoski family - a cultural heritage site
- House of Ḱitanoski family - a cultural heritage site
- House of Pešinoski family - a cultural heritage site
- House of Pluškoski family - a cultural heritage site
- House of Kalajdžieski family - a cultural heritage site
- House of Gogoski family - a cultural heritage site
- House of Daskaloski family - a cultural heritage site
- Kostojčinoski fulling mill and gristmill - a cultural heritage site
