= House of Pluškoski family =

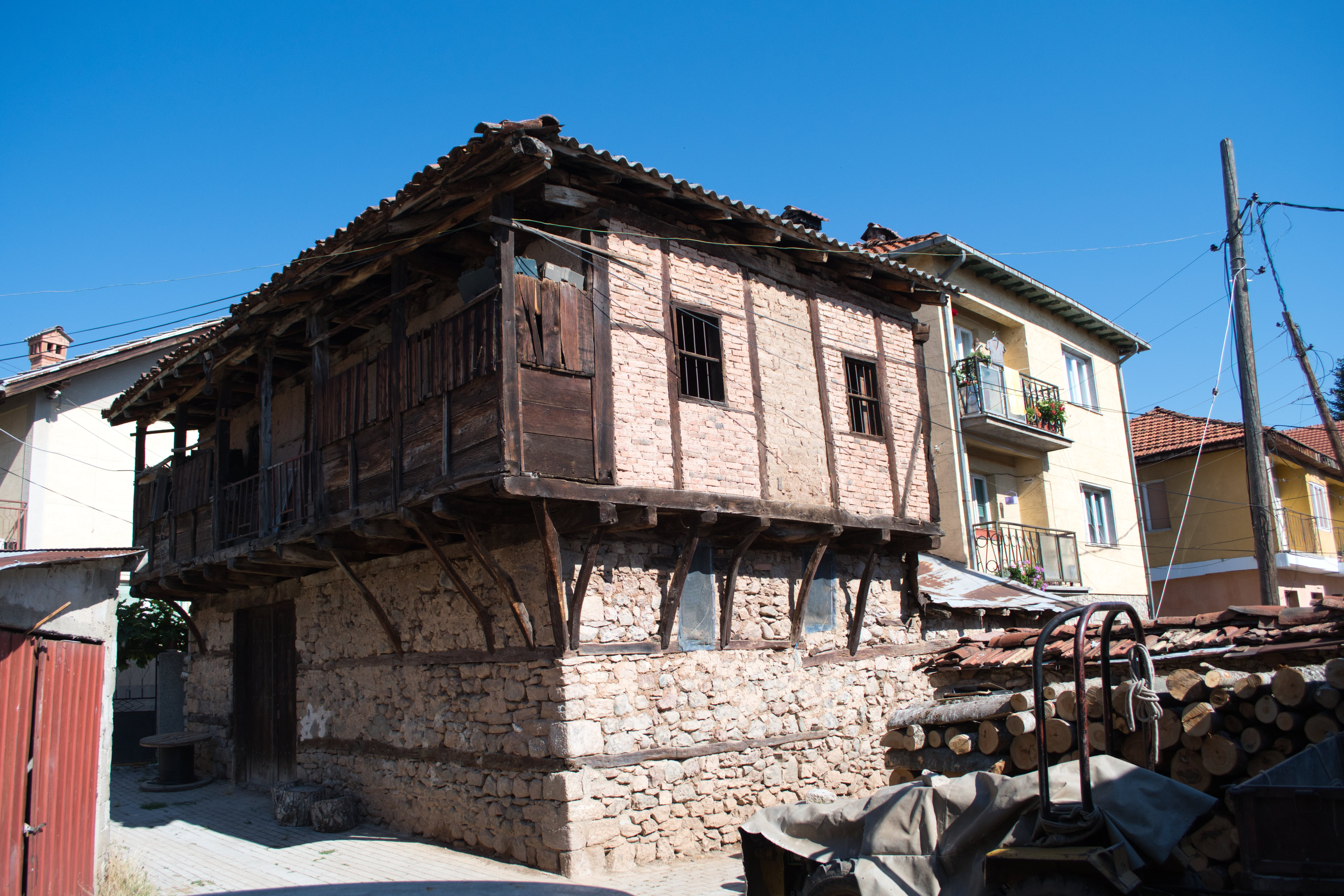
- Interactive map of the House of Pluškoski family area

General information
- Status: Monument of Culture
- Type: House
- Location: Vevčani, North Macedonia
- Owner: Pluškoski family

Technical details
- Floor count: 2

The House of Pluškoski family, or House of Pluškovci is a house in the village of Vevčani, Vevčani Municipality, North Macedonia. The house belongs to the Pluškoski family and the building is registered as a Cultural Heritage of North Macedonia.

== Architecture ==
The House of Pluškoski family is a house with a specifically divided chardak that runs through the house's outer space.

== Gallery ==
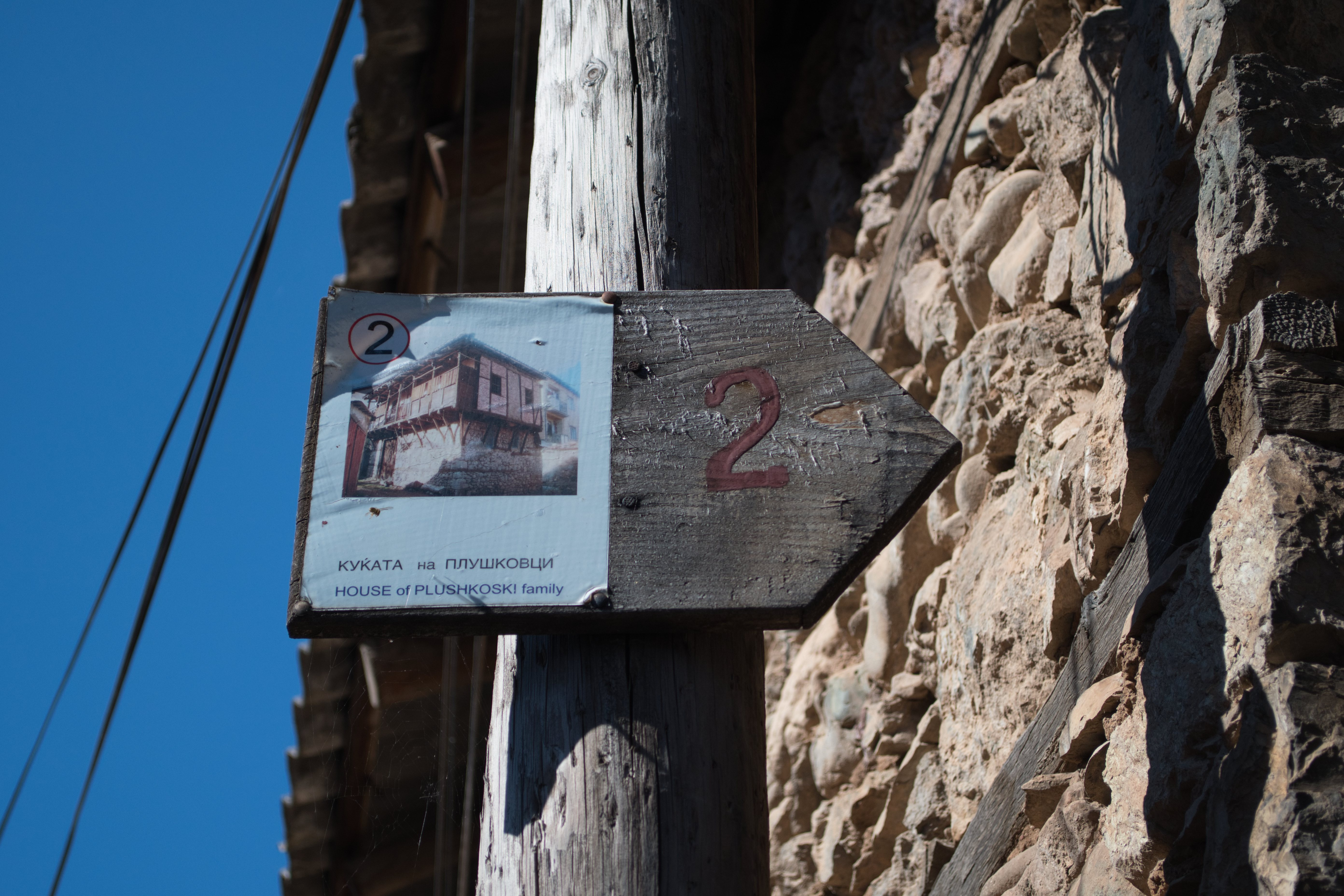
Directions to the house

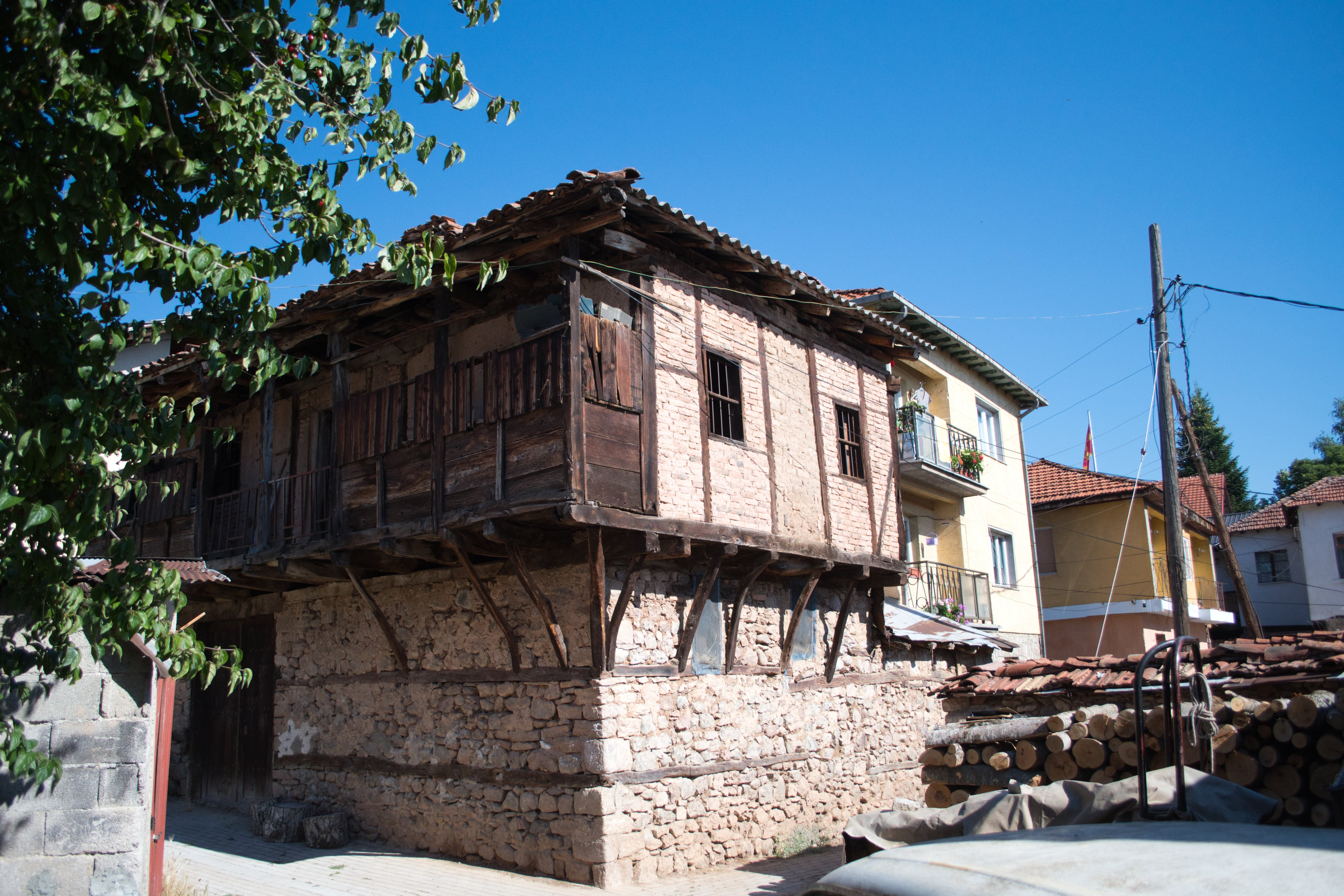
A view of the house

== See also ==
- House of Kostojčinoski family - a cultural heritage site
- House of Duckinoski family - a cultural heritage site
- House of Korunoski family - a cultural heritage site
- House of Ḱitanoski family - a cultural heritage site
- House of Pešinoski family - a cultural heritage site
- House of Kalajdžieski family - a cultural heritage site
- House of Gogoski family - a cultural heritage site
- House of Daskaloski family - a cultural heritage site
- House of Poposki family - a cultural heritage site
- Kostojčinoski fulling mill and gristmill - a cultural heritage site
