= House of Daskaloski family =

- Interactive map of the House of Daskaloski family area

General information
- Status: Cultural Heritage of North Macedonia
- Type: House
- Location: Vevčani, North Macedonia
- Completed: 1910
- Owner: Daskaloski family

Technical details
- Floor count: 2

The House of Daskaloski family, or House of Daskalovci is a house in the village of Vevčani, Vevčani Municipality, North Macedonia. The house belongs to the Daskaloski family and the building is registered as a Cultural Heritage of North Macedonia.

== History ==
The house was built in 1910. It belonged to two brothers from the old Daskalovci family who were tailors, making high-quality traditional folk costumes. Their father and other brothers were internationally known masons.

== Architecture ==
The building is modest in size. The first (ground) floor is made of stone, leveled with wooden sashes in dry masonry. There is brick arched decoration above the shuttered windows. The costume workshop and the sales shop were on the ground floor. The second floor is built of solid brick and has wooden windows also arched with solid brick. On this floor were the living rooms. The mezzanine and roof construction is made of chestnut beams. The roof is multi-pitched with tiles placed on a canvas of boards. The staircase that connects the ground floor and the first floor is also made of chestnut wood, as are all the internal doors. On the floor there is a centrally located closed porch, bay window sticking out on wooden beams with decoration specifically for this village, called Vevčanski kučinja (lit. Vevčani dogs). The wooden roof construction beams, which form the eaves with wooden planks, are also adorned with such decorations.

== See also ==
- House of Kostojčinoski family – a cultural heritage site
- House of Duckinoski family – a cultural heritage site
- House of Korunoski family – a cultural heritage site
- House of Ḱitanoski family – a cultural heritage site
- House of Pešinoski family – a cultural heritage site
- House of Pluškoski family – a cultural heritage site
- House of Kalajdžieski family – a cultural heritage site
- House of Gogoski family – a cultural heritage site
- House of Poposki family – a cultural heritage site
- Kostojčinoski fulling mill and gristmill – a cultural heritage site
