= Ștefan Mihăileanu =

Aromanian professor and journalist

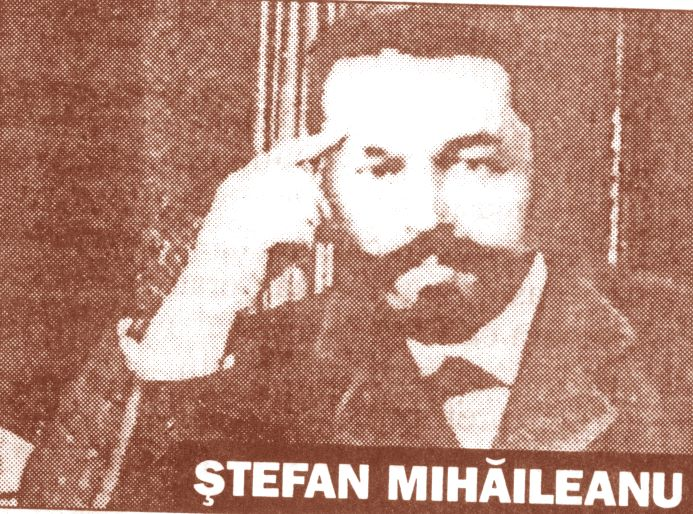

Ștefan Mihăileanu (1859 – 22 July 1900) was an Aromanian professor and journalist. On 22 July 1900, he was assassinated by a Bulgarian nationalist, due to his criticism of pro-Bulgarian paramilitary activism over the course of the Macedonian Struggle.

== Biography ==
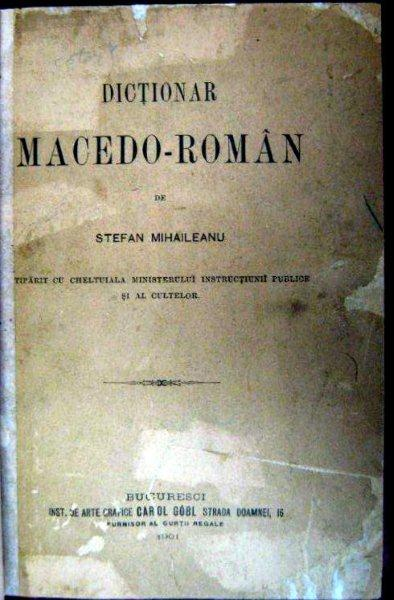
Mihăileanu's Aromanian–Romanian dictionary

Ștefan Mihăileanu was born in 1859, in Beala di Suprã, Ottoman Empire. An ethnic Aromanian, he was one of the first students in Ottoman Macedonia to attend classes in the Aromanian language. Due to the political turmoil that preceded the Macedonian Struggle, Mihăileanu's uncle brought him to Romania, where he continued his education in the Saint Sava National College. The Macedonian Struggle, a series of intertwined cultural, political and military conflicts between the various ethnic and religious communities residing in Macedonia, was to preoccupy Mihăileanu until the end of his life. He combined his career as a teacher and published the Macedonia newspaper between 1888 and 1889. Later on, he continued to produce articles for Peninsula Balcanică (1893–1900). There, he put out proposals on the resolution of the Macedonian Struggle and engaged in controversies with Greek and Bulgarian newspapers. Proposing the slogan "Aromanians by Themselves", he promoted the foundation of churches and schools in Aromanian communities across Macedonia, where a separate Aromanian identity was to be forged. His newspaper was widely distributed in Aromanian communities in Macedonia and even in Thessaly and Epirus. Unlike Greek and Bulgarian activists, he rejected anti-Ottoman irredentism.

On 1 February 1900, in Bucharest, agents of the Supreme Macedonian-Adrianople Committee (SMAC) killed Kiril Fitovski, who was sent by the Committee to buy weapons in Romania, but was subsequently suspected of spying on behalf of the Ottoman government. Romanian police captured the assassins, Boycho Iliev and Hristo Karambulov, who made full confessions and revealed the involvement of the SMAC in the assassination. Subsequently Mihăileanu, published a number of articles in Peninsula Balcanică in which he branded SMAC as a criminal organization extorting wealthy people (including Aromanians) for money and revealed details of its preparations for armed struggle in Macedonia. SMAC's chairman Boris Sarafov reacted by ordering his assassination.

On 22 July 1900, Mihăileanu was assassinated by the Bulgarian SMAC komitadji Stoyan Dimitrov in Bucharest. His assassination created a diplomatic crisis between Romania and Bulgaria. An outcry of public opinion followed, tributes to Mihăileanu were published in the press and letters of support were sent to his place of birth describing him as a martyr of Romanianism. A play and several poems were dedicated in his memory. On 30 October, a Romanian court sentenced everyone involved in the plot both captured and in absentia to life in prison. In 1901, Mihăileanu's Aromanian–Romanian dictionary was published, written in such a way so as to enrich the Aromanian language with specially modified Romanian words.
