= Vevčani =

Vevčani Вевчани
- Village
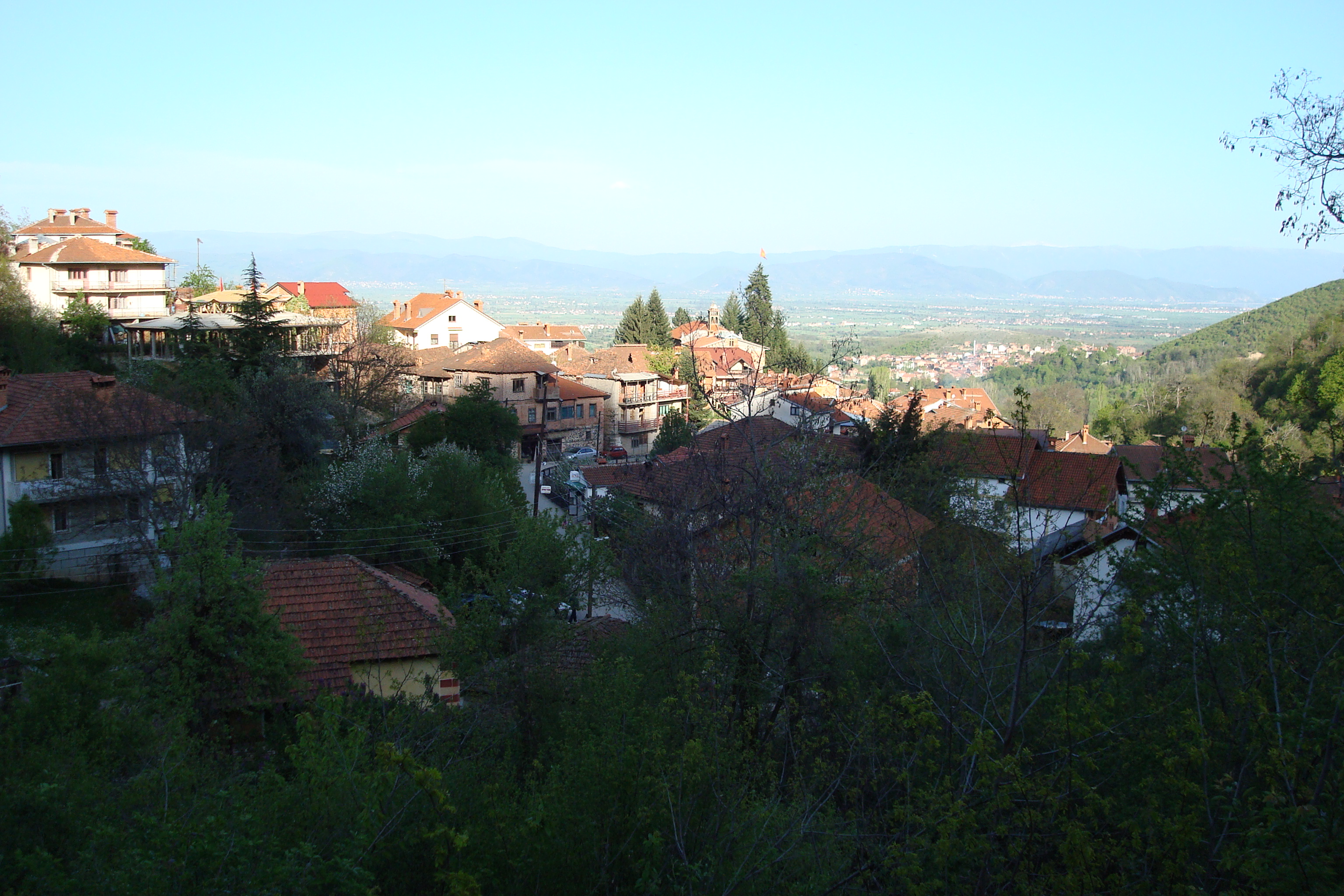
- View of Vevčani

- Location within North Macedonia
- Coordinates: 41°14′25″N 20°35′35″E
- Country: North Macedonia
- Region: Southwestern
- Municipality: Vevčani

Population (2018)
  - Total: 2,343
- Time zone: UTC+1 (CET)
  - Summer (DST): UTC+2 (CEST)
- Area code: +389
- Vehicle registration: VV
- Website: www.vevcani.org.mk

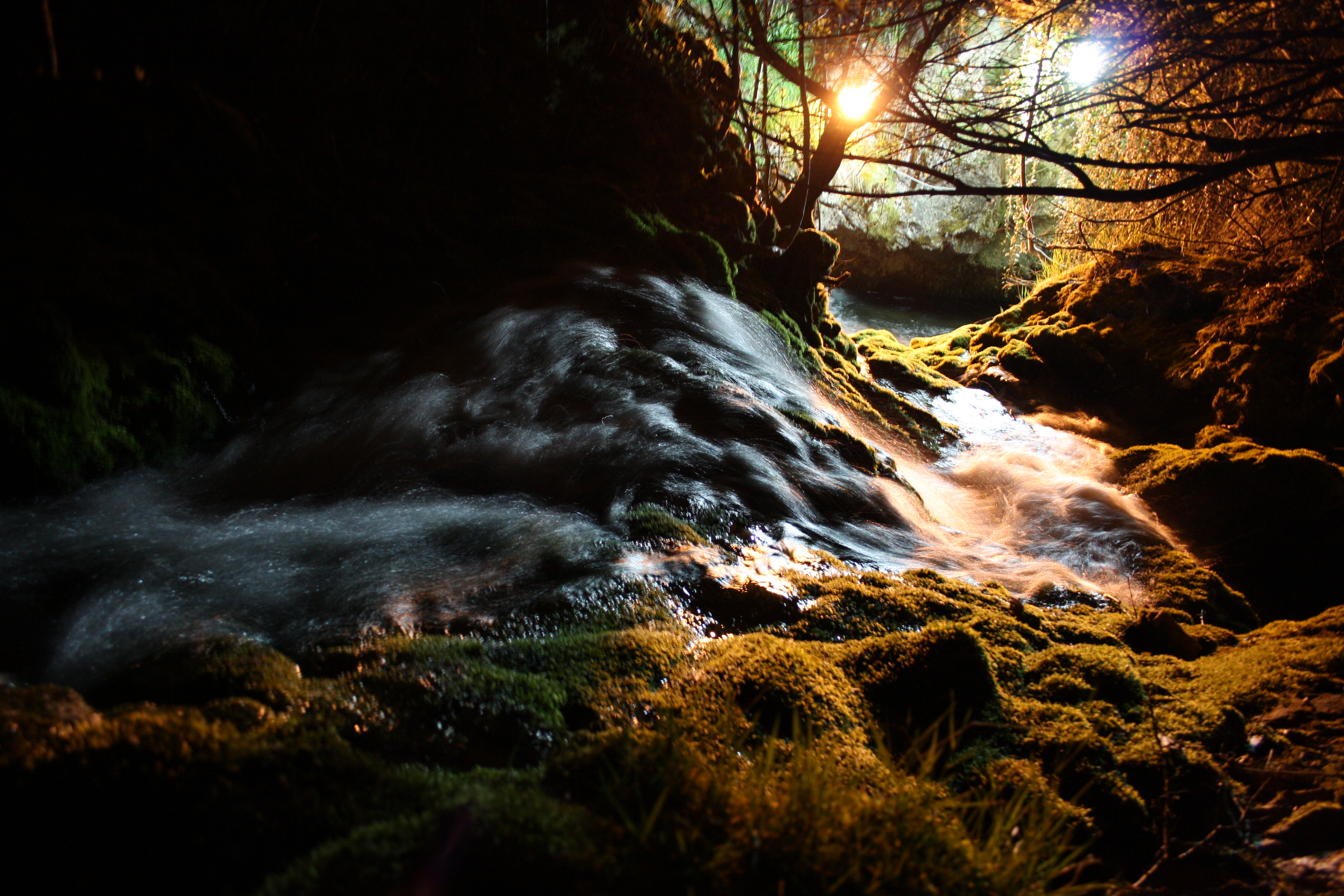
View of the springs in Vevčani

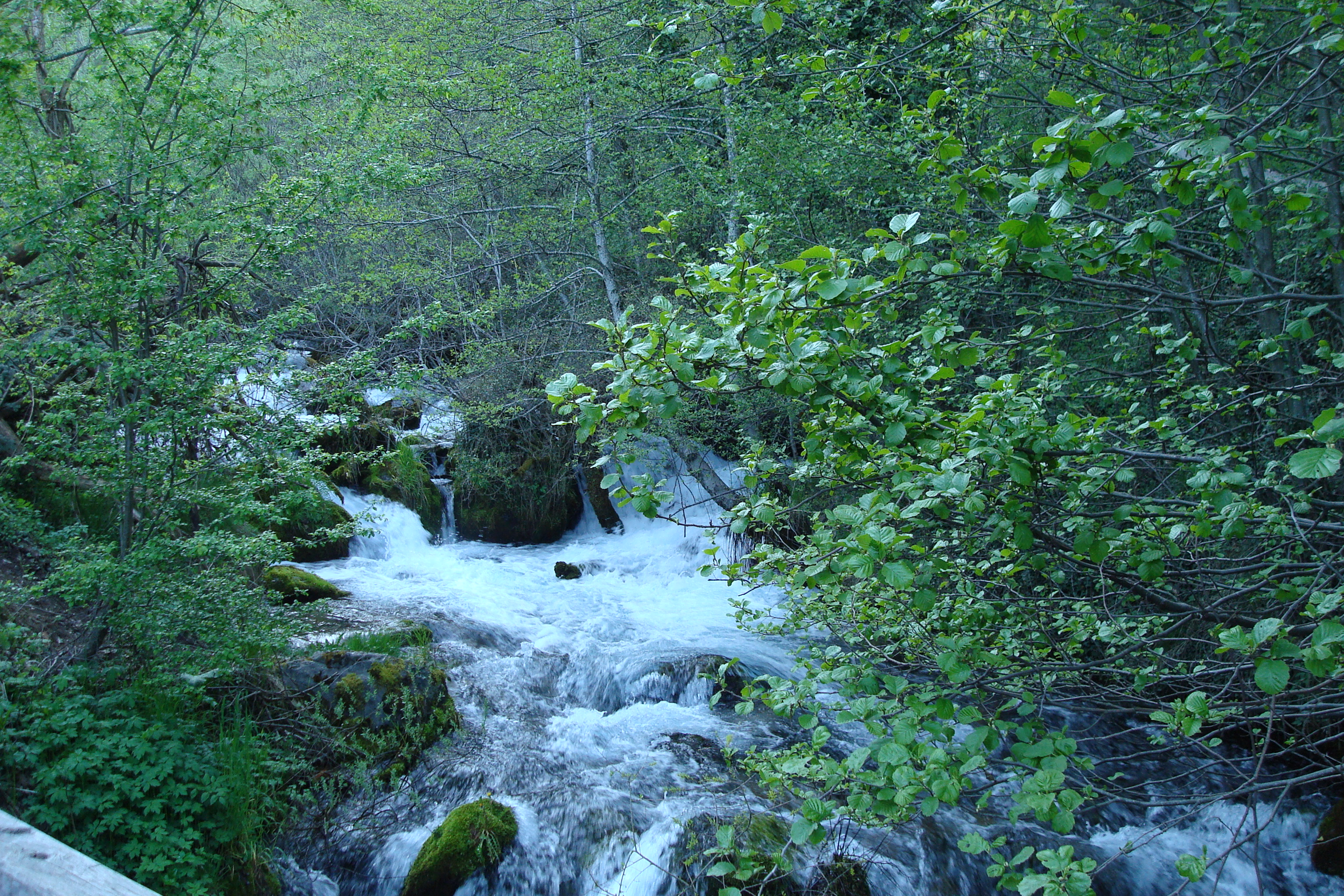
Springs in Vevčani

Vevčani (Macedonian: Вевчани) is a village in North Macedonia. It is the only settlement and seat of Vevčani Municipality.

== Geography ==
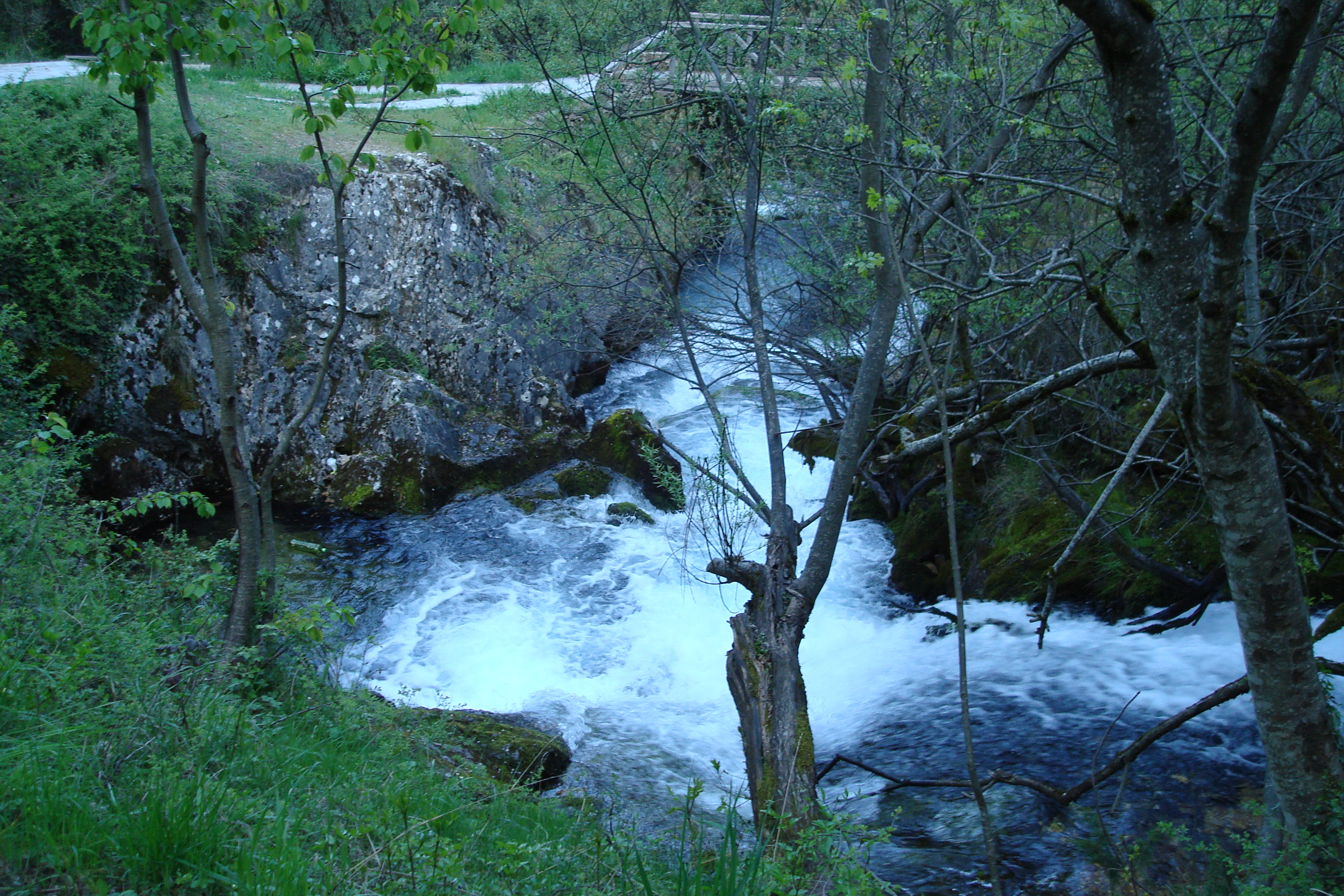
Springs in Vevčani

The village of Vevčani is found in the southwestern range at the foot of the Jablanica mountain range. It is situated from 800 – 950 metres above sea level. The village is located 14 km north-west of the town of Struga. The village is situated near the villages of Oktisi, Velešta, Podgorci, and Gorna Belica, with the Albanian border to the west of the village.

=== Vevčani Springs ===
The famous Vevčani Springs are some of the most famous springs to be found in North Macedonia. The springs are located on the eastern slope of the Jablanica Mountais, which run through the village of Vevčani at an altitude over 900 m. The largest spring is located at the opening of one of the many caves in the region. Below the largest spring are 10 minor springs, which all converge. The most famous spring is Jankov Kamen, which is situated at 1200 m above sea level. Another spring is Mala Livada from which the water has a unique flavour and colour. It is situated at over 1600 m above sea level. The highest spring is "Golina" situated over 2000 m above sea level. The rate of water flow from the springs is estimated to exceed 1500 litres per second, usually in spring.

=== Vevčani Lakes ===
Many glacial lakes are within the vicinity of the village of Vevčani . The highest and most prominent glacial lake is Lokva, which is over 2000 m above sea level on Mount Jablanica. It is the main provider of water to the Golina Spring.

== Etymology ==
The word "Vevčani" is based on an Old Church Slavonic word Ves (Church Slavonic: Вес), which meant "village" in Old Church Slavonic. The word Vesčani meant in Old Church Slavonic "people of Ves" or "Vesians". This soon became the name of the settlement. By the 14th century, the name Veščani was being used. In the 17th century records, the village is referred to Veščano (Вешчано). By the early 20th century, the village was often referred to as Vehčani (Вехчани) or Vesčani (Весчани), until the name Vevčani (Macedonian: Вевчани) was officially adopted. The village is also known as Veçani in Albanian and Vevčani in both Serbian and Bulgarian.

== History ==
According to the 1943 Albanian census, Vevčani was inhabited by 2672 Orthodox Macedonians, 80 Orthodox Aromanians, and 50 Orthodox Albanians.

=== Under Communist rule ===
In 1945, the village of Vevčani became a part of the newly founded People's Republic of Macedonia. In 1945, the municipality of Vevčani was founded, which included the nearby villages of Oktisi and Gorna Belica. This was dissolved in 1952, as Vevčani became a part of the Velešta Municipality until 1956, when it was merged with the Struga Municipality.

==== Vevčani Emergency ====
The Vevčani Emergency (Macedonian: Вевчански случај, Vevčanski slučaj) was an incident that occurred in the village on 26 May and 7 August 1987. The residents of Vevčani defied the decision of the Yugoslavian government to redirect water from the springs to Struga. They were at odds with the government's attempts to have the inhabitants of Struga using what they saw as their water. Police were assembled twice in the village before the situation was resolved. The residents had sparked calls for democracy and freedom from the Yugoslavia government. A "Republic of Vevčani" had been planned by the residents.

=== Republic of Vevčani and the Vevčani Ličnik ===
After the fall of Communism, as a bid to attract more tourism to the village, the residents of Vevčani voted to create an independent republic. The "Republic of Vevčani" (Macedonian: Република Вевчани, Republika Vevčani) was soon founded.

As a part of the self-styled "Independent Republic of Vevčani" declared in 2002, the "Vevčani Ličnik" (Macedonian: Вевчански Личник) was created as souvenir currency for the area. The "Ličnici" (plural) come in denominations of 1, 2, 5, 10, 50, 100, 500 and 1,000. The author was artist Simun Lesoski.

=== Municipality of Vevčani ===
In 2002, the Vevčani municipality was founded. The reconstituted municipality included only the village of Vevčani.

== Culture ==
Vevčani is known for being a hub of culture and history in the Drimkol region. It has old architecture and many preserved churches from the 17th and 18th centuries.

=== Religion ===
Vevčani is home to the Parish of Vevčani which also includes the villages of Oktisi and Gorna Belica. For centuries the village has been a Christian village surrounded by many Muslim villages. The village is home to 19 Churches, Monasteries and Chapels. The central church of the village however is Sveti Nikola which dates back from 1876. A prominent monastery is Sveti Spas which is situated at over 1,300 metres above sea level.

=== Cultural heritage ===
The village has 11 cultural heritage sites (Macedonian: Споменици на културата, Spomenici na kulturata) including:

- House of Duckinoski family
- House of Korunoski family
- House of Kostojčinoski family
- House of Ḱitanoski family
- House of Pešinoski family
- House of Pluškoski family
- House of Kalajdžieski family
- House of Gogoski family
- House of Daskaloski family
- House of Poposki family
- Kostojčinoski fulling mill and gristmill – a cultural heritage site

== Vevčani-Radožda dialect ==
The inhabitants of Vevčani speak a unique dialect of Macedonian which is known as the Vevčani-Radožda dialect. The dialect is traditionally spoken in three other villages along with Vevčani. They are Radožda and Mali Vlaj along with the village of Lin in Albania.

== The Carnival of Vevčani ==
The Carnival of Vevčani is an annual event claimed to be over 1,400 years old. It is held to celebrate the New Year according to the Julian calendar. During the carnival attendees wear masks, usually dressing in traditional and modern costumes. They also employ social and political satire.

== Demographics ==
=== Demographic history ===
In a 1509 defter, the village was part of the Ohrid vilayet, and had 208 households. In 1519, the village had 223 households. In 1634, it was registered under the name Vevčano with a total of 134 households. The French ethnographic study of Macedonia conducted in 1878, Ethnography of the vilayets of Adrianople, of Monastir and of Salonica, (French: Ethnographie des Vilayets d'Adrianople, de Monastir et de Salonique), counted the village as having 865 houses and 2430 inhabitants, which at the time were considered Bulgarians. Vasil Kanchov's study of Macedonia in 1900, Macedonia, Ethnography and Statistics, (Bulgarian: Македония. Етнография и статистика, Makedonija. Etnografija i statistika), counted the village as having 2590 Bulgarian inhabitants. A study conducted in 1907 had counted 440 households with 2,347 inhabitants. In 1910, a Serbian commune of the Ecumenical Patriarchate of Constantinople numbered 17 households which were considered ethnically Serbian in the village. Some Aromanians from the nearby village of Gorna Belica have resettled in Vevčani. The 1994 census counted 2,448 inhabitants as residing in the village.

=== Demographics today ===
According to the 2002 Macedonian census, the population of Vevčani was 2,433. In 2002, there were 593 households present in Vevčani. Of the 2,433 inhabitants, 1,229 were Males while 1,204 were females. The ethnic composition was as follows:

- Macedonians – 2,422 (99.55%)
- Serbs – 3 (0.12%)
- Aromanians – 1 (0.04%)
- Others – 7 (0.28%)

== Sport ==
The football team "FK Vevčani" (Macedonian: ФК Вевчани) is based in Vevčani. The team is a competitor in the Macedonian Treta Liga.

== Notable people ==
- Jovan Popovski – writer, journalist
- Milutin Bebekoski – writer
- Jakim Alulov, (? – 1903) – revolutionary and voivode
- Stavre Gogov, (1884–1907) – voivode from Vevčani
- Simun Lesoski – artist
- Stojan Razmovski – artist
