= Gorna Belica =

Gorna Belica Горна Белица Belicë e Sipërme
- Village
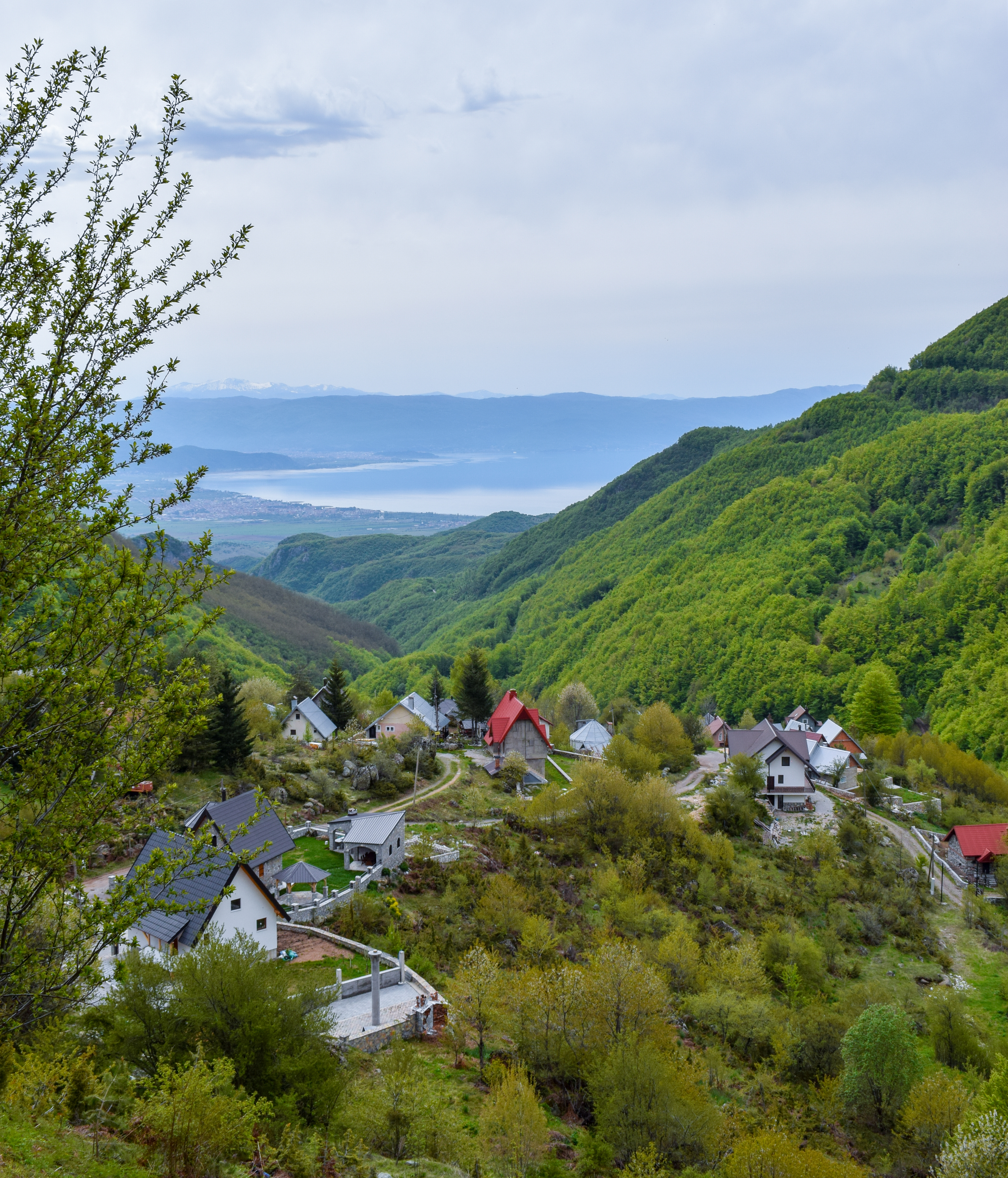

- Location within North Macedonia
- Coordinates: 41°13′26″N 20°33′15″E
- Country: North Macedonia
- Region: Southwestern
- Municipality: Struga
- Elevation: 1,316 m (4,318 ft)

Population (2002)
  - Total: 1
- Time zone: UTC+1 (CET)
  - Summer (DST): UTC+2 (CEST)
- Area code: +38946
- Car plates: SU
- Website: .

Gorna Belica (Macedonian: Горна Белица; Albanian: Belicë e Sipërme) is a village in the municipality of Struga, North Macedonia. The village is located close to the Albania-North Macedonia border.

== Name ==
The village is known as Beala di Suprã in Aromanian.

== History ==
The village appears in the 1467/68 Defter.

According to a local tradition, Gorna Belica was founded on the unseen slopes of Mount Jablanica by Aromanians from the villages of Niçë and Llëngë, fleeing the 18th century socio-political and economic crises in what is now southern Albania. Close family relations were maintained through intermarriage between Aromanians from Gorna Belica and those of Niçë and Llëngë. In the nineteenth century, other Aromanian groups like the Arvanitovlachs attempted to settle in Gorna Belica which caused friction with older Aromanian inhabitants but were allowed to do so later after negotiations. The Arvanitovlachs bought the properties of older Gorna Belica Aromanians who had converted to the Muslim faith and left the settlement.

During the first World War, Gorna Belica was occupied by the Bulgarian military who evacuated most of the Aromanian villagers and sent them into the interior of Bulgaria and Serbia. The relocation of local Aromanians was due to Bulgarian forces being concerned that pro-Greek and pro-Serbian sympathies existed among them resulting in possible cooperation with the Entente Allies. While in exile, some villagers had to fend for themselves whereas others for the Bulgarians did forced labour. Some Aromanians returning to Gorna Belica through Thessaloniki, Greece attempted to stay in that country and settle there though Greek authorities turned down their requests.

Aromanians from Gorna Belica were involved with trade, while Albanians worked as building labourers and both communities did little agricultural work as conditions in the area were not suitable. Until 1920, villagers from Gorna Belica used to trade with neighbouring villages of the Librazhd area in Albania. With Albania closing its border after the Balkan Wars (1912-1913), Gorna Belica was slowly abandoned with the last residents leaving around 1960. In the early 21st century Gorna Belica has become a recreational center for the municipality of Struga.

== Demographics ==
Gorna Belica, along with Dolna Belica, is one of two traditional settlements located in the Drimkol region within Struga municipality which has historically been inhabited by an Aromanian and Albanian community. The Tosk dialect of the Albanian language was spoken in the village. Over time, Gorna Belica has become depopulated. Some Aromanians from Gorna Belica have resettled in the nearby village of Vevčani.

In statistics gathered by Vasil Kanchov in 1900, the village of Gorna Belica was inhabited by 850 Aromanians and 150 Muslim Albanians.

According to the 2002 census, the village had a total of 1 inhabitants. Ethnic groups in the village include:

- Macedonians 1

As of the 2021 census, Gorna Belica had 4 residents with the following ethnic composition:

- Albanians 4

== Notable people ==
- Ștefan Mihăileanu (1859–1900), Aromanian professor and journalist
