= Bundwerk =

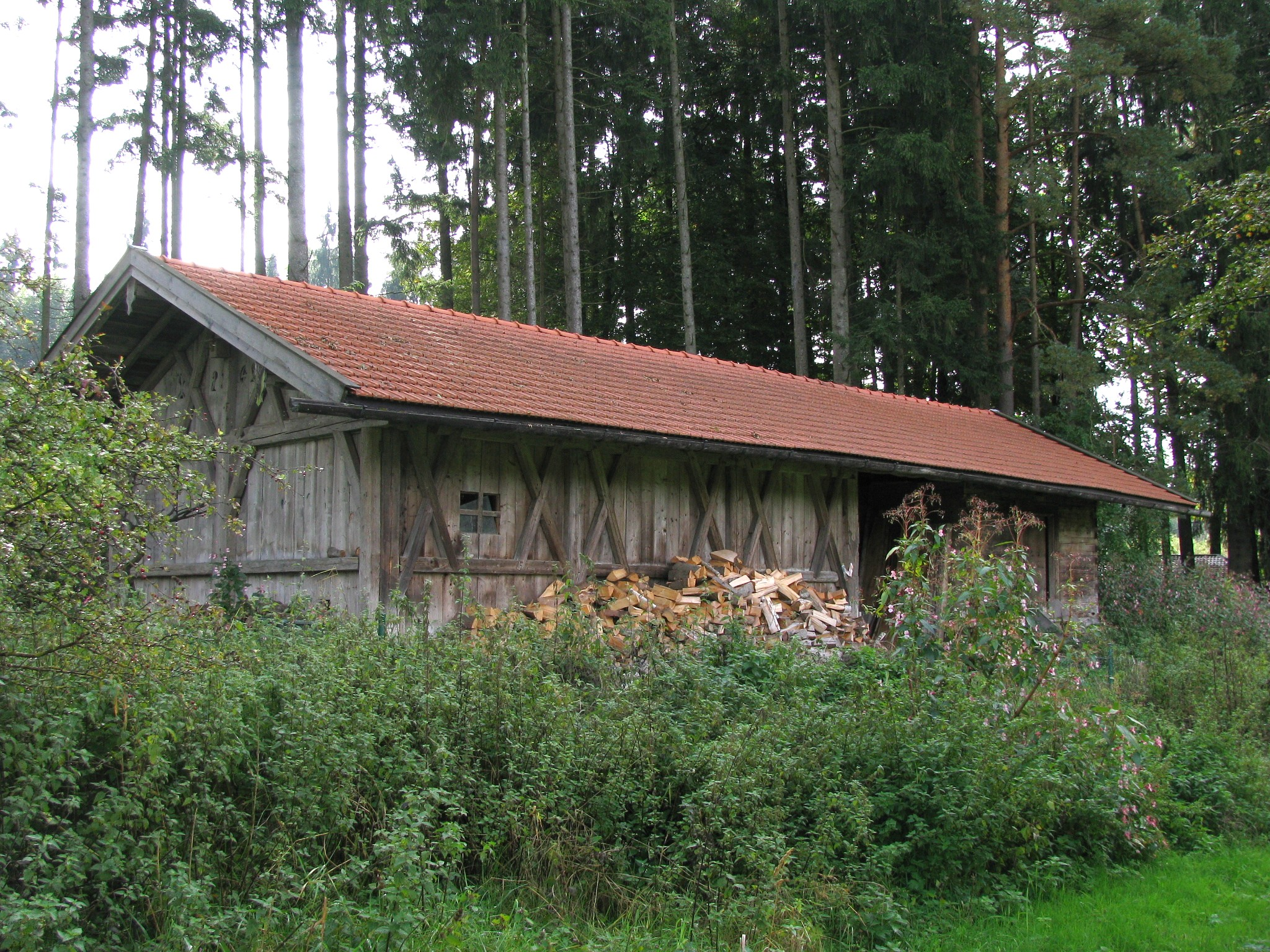
A bundwerk barn or stadel

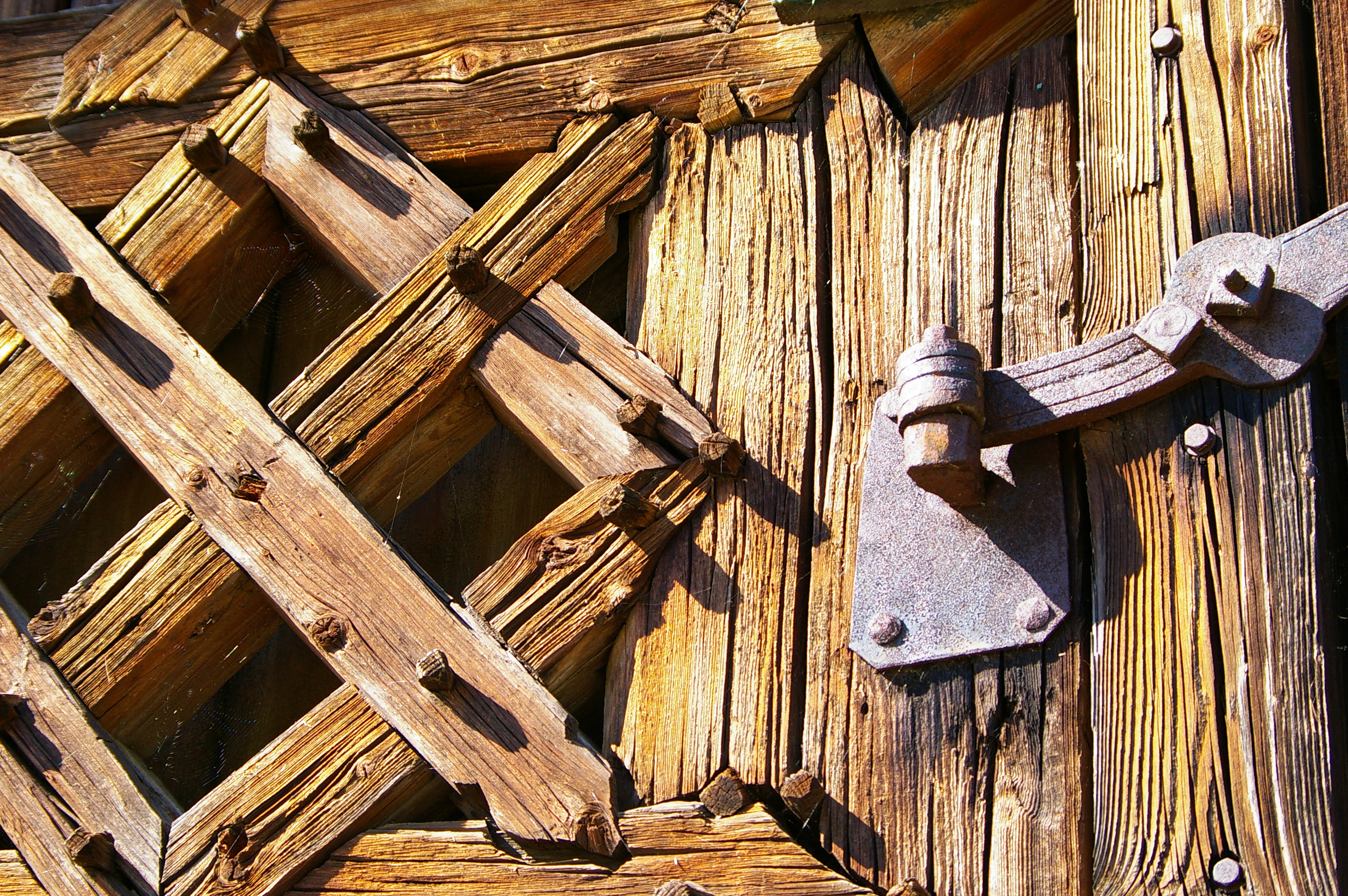
A bundwerk stadel (detail)

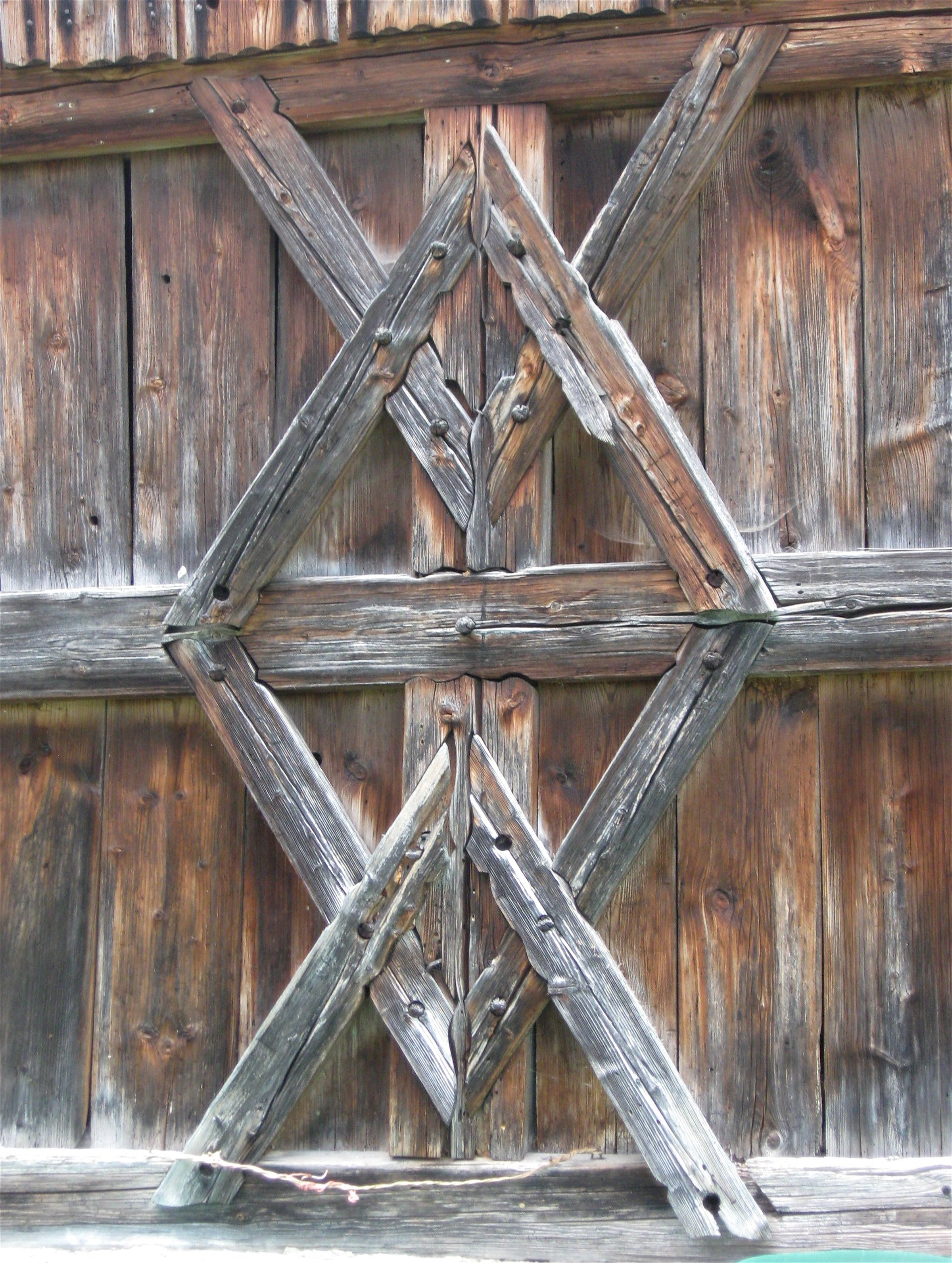
Bundwerk detail on a farmhouse in Glonn

Bundwerk is a method of building with timber that was used especially in the 19th century in Austria, South Tyrol and Bavaria. After log construction and timber framing, bundwerk is one of the most widespread forms of timber building techniques. It involved using wooden beams that were arranged partly in a lattice or diagonally over a cross. It often decorated the front and gable sides of agricultural buildings, frequently the grain barn or Stadel of quadrangular farms (Vierseithöfen).

In northeastern Upper Bavaria bundwerk is especially varied and colourful. By contrast, in the Werdenfelser Land and the region around Innsbruck only a few places exhibit this type of timber building throughout.

Bundwerk had its heyday between 1830 and 1860 when artists and woodcarvers, as well as carpenters, decorated the bundwerk with paintings and carvings, often with mythical creatures or Christian symbols.

== Literature ==
- Jüngling, Armin: Das Bundwerk am Bauernhaus des Chiemgaus. 1978
- Stoermer, Hans W.: Zimmererkunst am Bauernhaus: Bayrisch-Alpines Bundwerk. 1981
- Werner, Paul:
  - Das Bundwerk: eine alte Zimmermannstechnik: Konstruktion, Gestaltung, Ornamentik. 1985; 1988
  - Bundwerk in Bayern. 1988
  - Das Bundwerk in Bayern. 2000 - ISBN 3-927957-22-4
  - Fratzen und Schlangen am Stadel Bundwerk; das schönste Zeugnis bäuerlicher Baukultur. In: Unser Bayern. 2000
- Enno Burmeister: Bundwerkstadel im Rupertiwinkel. 1989
- Günther Knesch:
  - Der Bundwerkstadel Architektur und Volkskunst im östlichen Oberbayern. 1989
  - Wie alt ist das niederbayerische Bundwerk. In: Bayerisches Jahrbuch für Volkskunde. 1989
  - Der Bundwerkstadel von Nodern aus der Zeit um 1600. In: Ars Bavarica. 1989
  - Zansham, ein reichgestalteter Bundwerkstadel des 19. Jahrhunderts. In: Forschungen zur historischen Volkskultur. 1989
  - Der „Stiefel“ am niederbayerischen Bundwerk. In: Ars Bavarica. 1991
  - Bundwerkstadel aus Ostoberbayern 28 Bauaufnahmen. 1991
  - Holzbau in Niederbayern: Ständerbau, Bundwerk, Blockbau am Stadel. In: Niederbayern. 1995
  - Der Bundwerkstadel von Feldkirchen bei Trostberg Bauwerk und Bedeutung. In: Ars Bavarica. 1996
  - Bundwerkstadel in Niederbayern eine Dokumentation. 1997
  - Bundwerkstadel bäuerliche Baukunst in Niederbayern. In: Ostbairische Grenzmarken. 1998
  - Der Bundwerkstadel beim „Wagenhofer“. In: Das Salzfass. 1998
  - Löwen am Bundwerk. In: Schönere Heimat. 2001
  - Ein Bundwerkstadelbilderbogen. In: Das Salzfass. 2001
- Die Bundwerkbau in einigen Landschaften des Alpenvorlandes und des Alpenlandes. In: Historischer Holzbau in Europa. 1999
