= Vevčani Municipality =

Municipality of North Macedonia

Coordinates: 41.2403°N 20.5931°E

Vevčani Municipality Општина Вевчани
- Rural Municipality
- Flag Coat of arms

- Country: North Macedonia
- Region: Southwestern
- Municipal seat: Vevčani

Government
  - Mayor: Spase Kočovski (VMRO-DPMNE)

Population
  - Total: 2,359
- Time zone: UTC+1 (CET)
- Vehicle registration: VV
- Website: http://www.vevcani.gov.mk/

Vevčani (Macedonian: Вевчани) is a municipality in western North Macedonia. Vevčani is also the name of the municipal seat and the only settlement of the municipality. This municipality is part of the Southwestern Statistical Region.

== Geography ==
The municipality borders Struga Municipality to the north, east, and south and Albania to the west.

== Demographics ==
According to the 2021 North Macedonia census, this municipality has 2,359 inhabitants. Ethnic groups in the municipality include:

	2002		2021	
	Number	%	Number	%
TOTAL	2,433	100	2,359	100
Macedonians	2,419	99.42	2,252	95.46
Albanians	3	0.12	14	0.59
Vlachs	1	0.04	4	0.17
Serbs	3	0.12	3	0.13
Other / Undeclared / Unknown	7	0.3	6	0.26
Persons for whom data are taken from administrative sources			80	3.39
