= St. Kyriaki Chapel, Vevčani =

St. Kyriaki Chapel
- Параклис „Св. Недела“
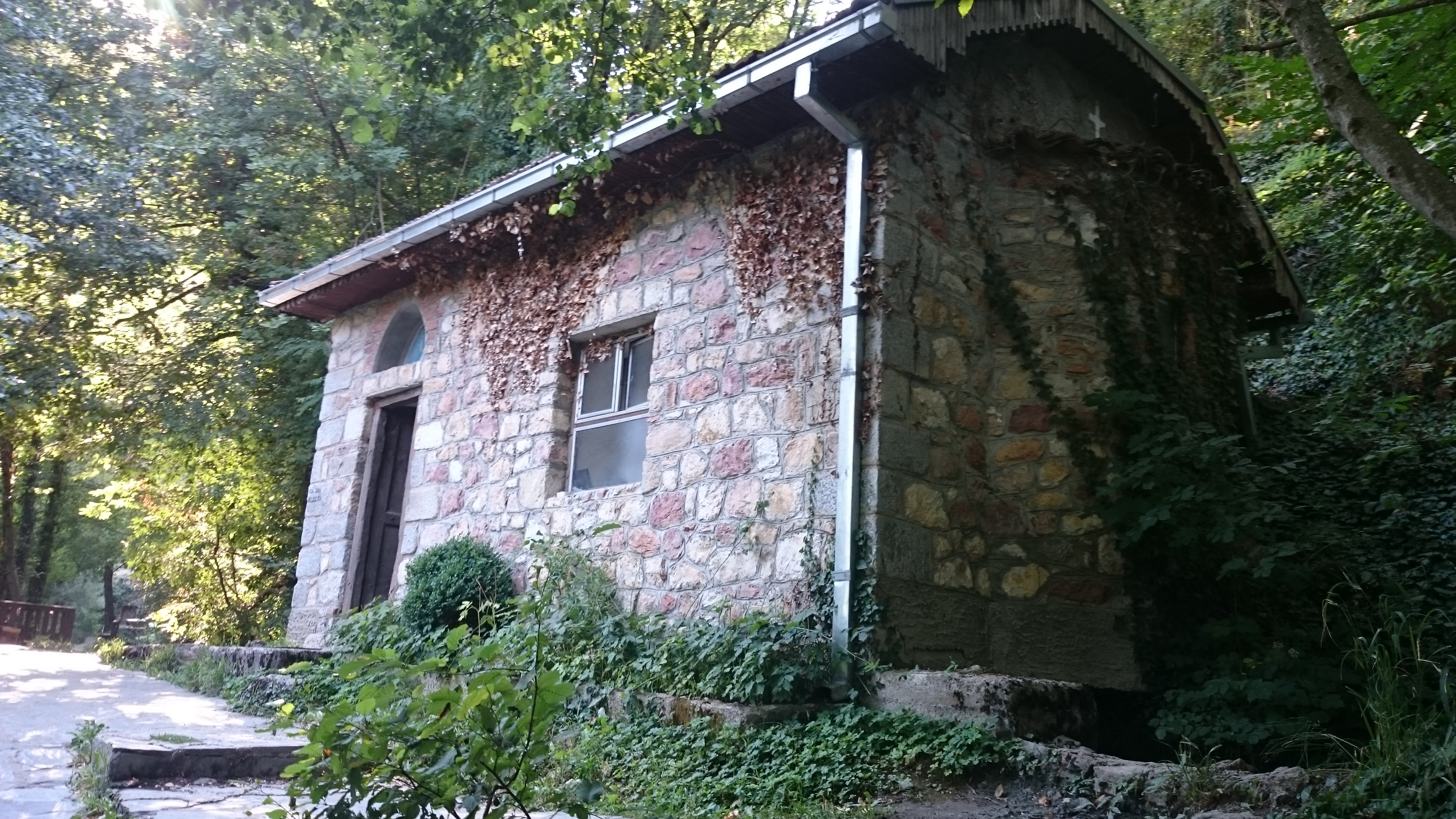
- The temple in 2015
- St. Kyriaki Chapel
- 41.239794°N 20.585625°E
- Location: Vevčani
- Country: North Macedonia
- Denomination: Eastern Orthodox; Macedonian Orthodox Church
- Website: www.dke.org.mk

History
- Dedication: Saint Kyriaki

Architecture
- Functional status: yes

Administration
- Diocese: Debar and Kičevo Diocese
- Parish: Vevčani Parish

The St. Kyriaki Chapel is a Macedonian Orthodox chapel, colloquially referred to as a church, in the village of Vevčani.

== Location and history ==
The church is located within the Vevčani Springs in the locality/area called Izvor. It is made on the water flow running from the spring.

The iconostasis was made by Ǵorǵija Bubanoski in 1939.

== Gallery ==
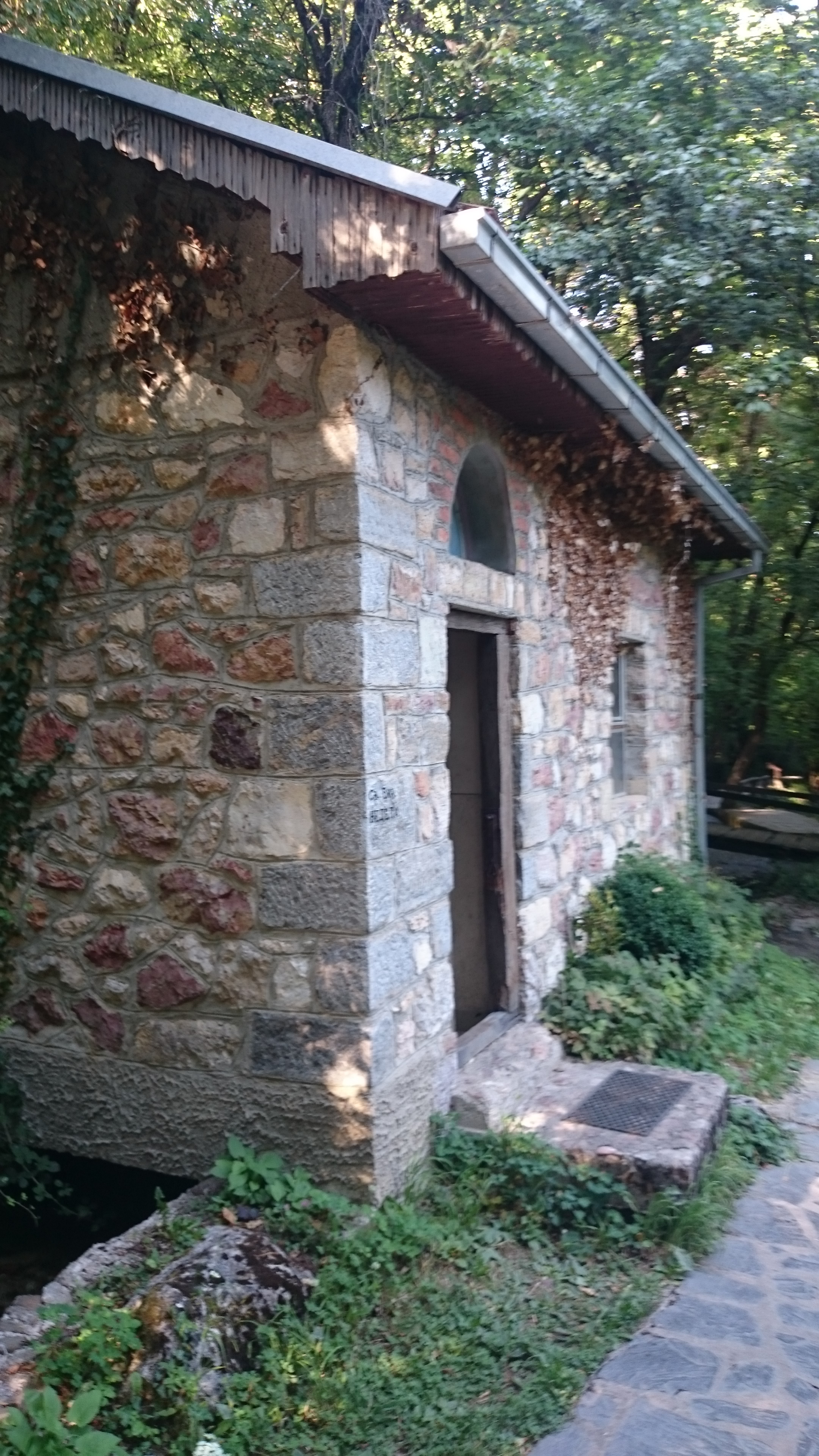
The temple in 2015

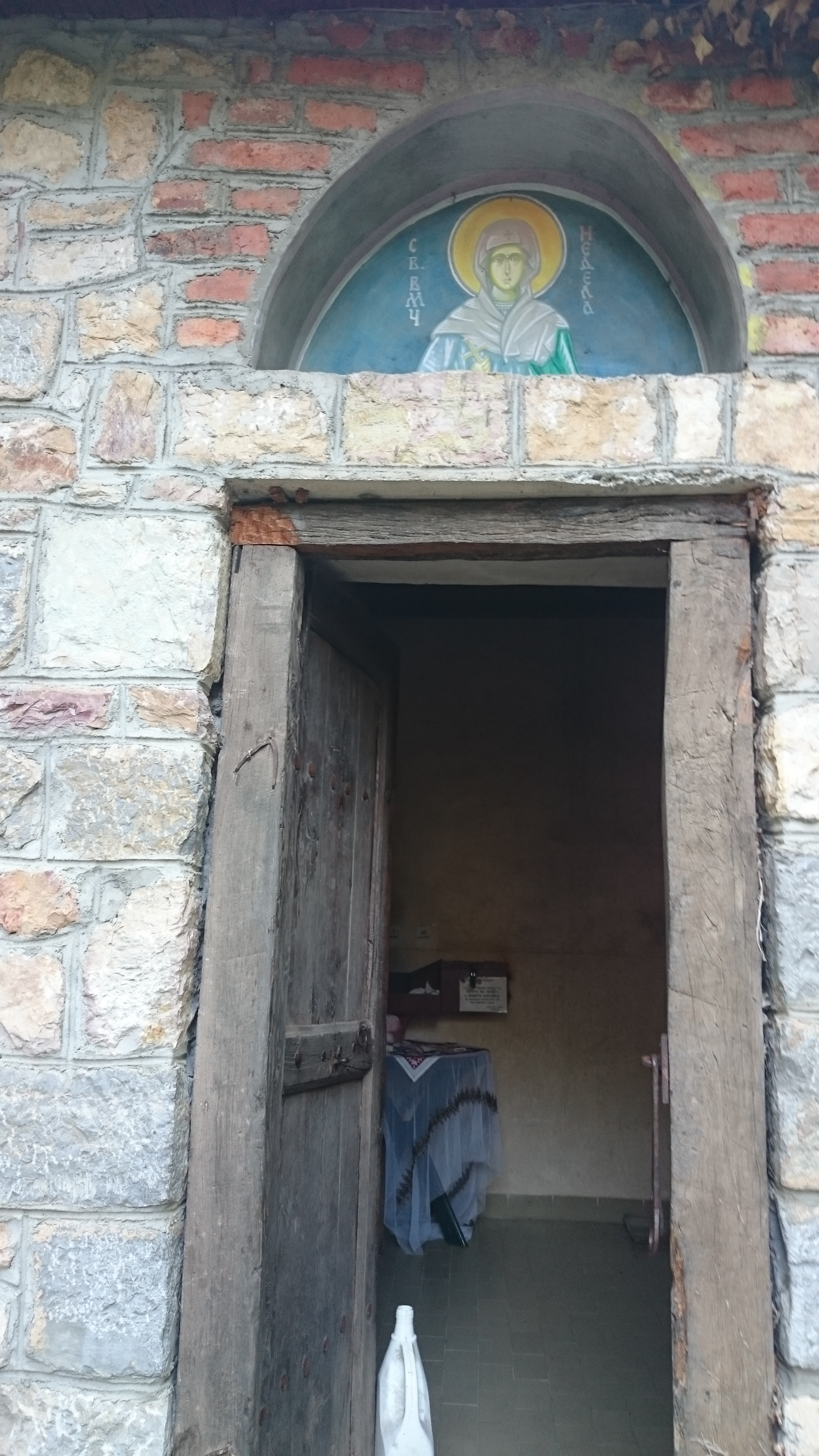
The temple in 2015

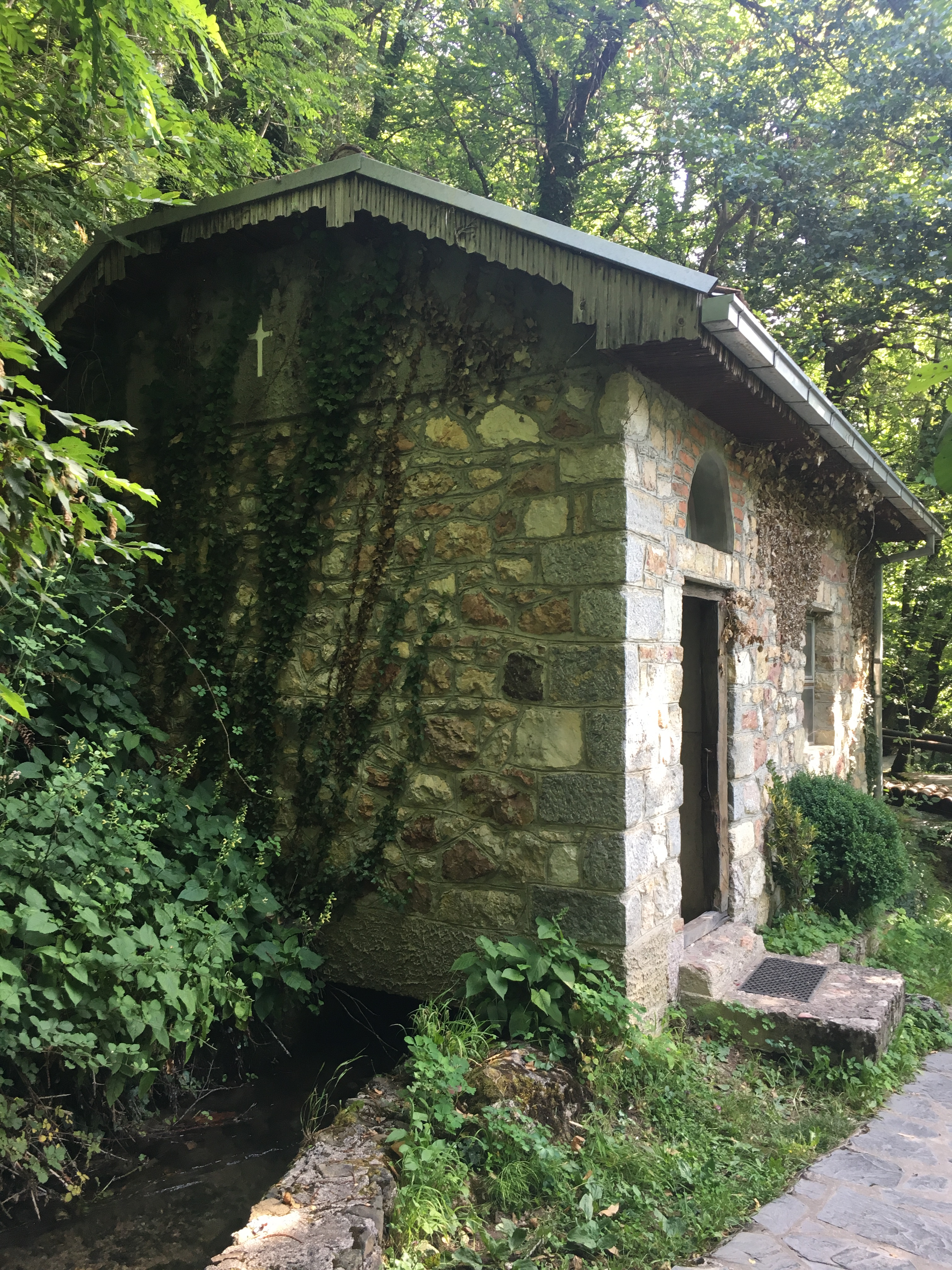
The temple in 2018

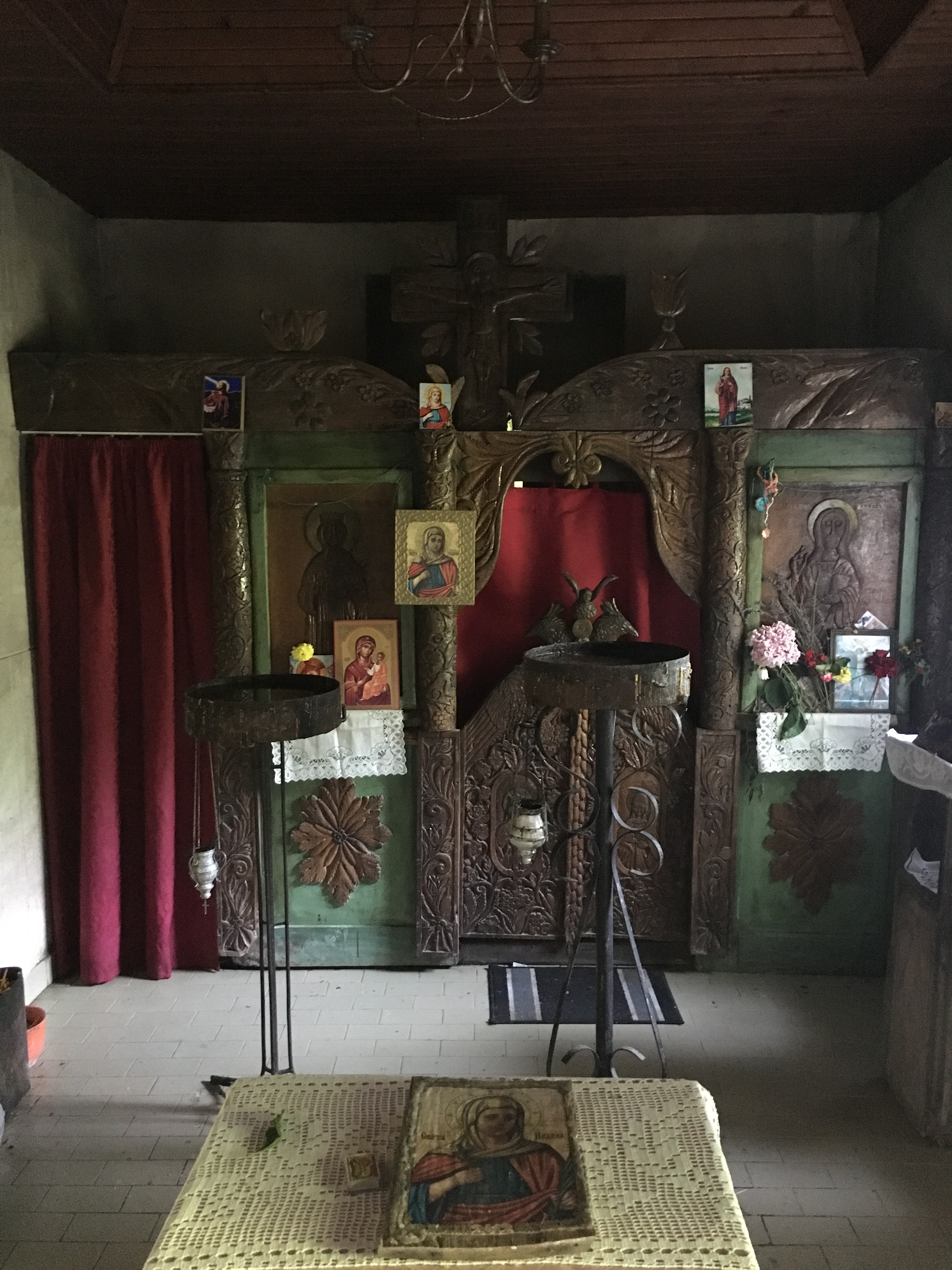
The temple in 2018

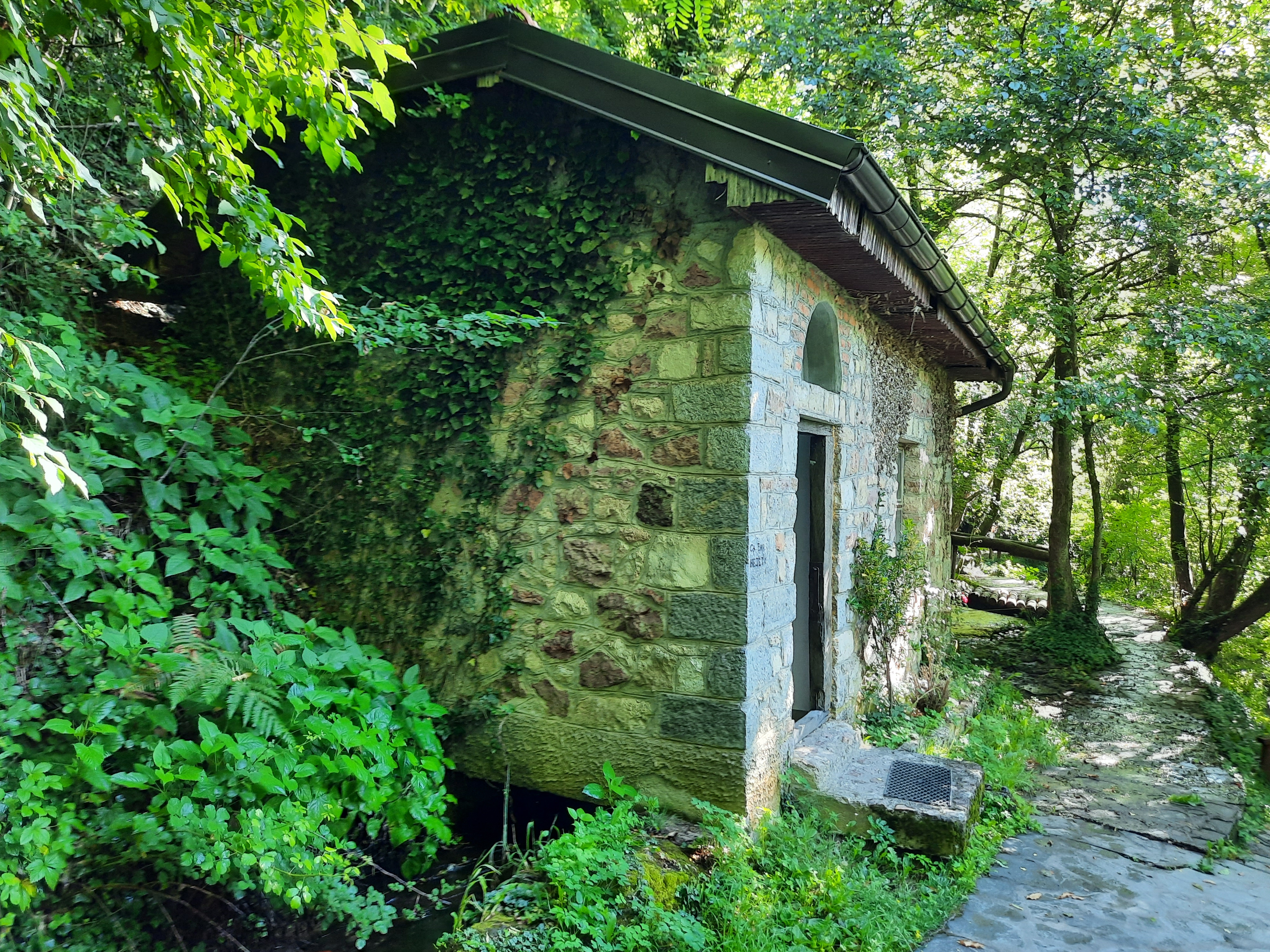
The temple in 2023

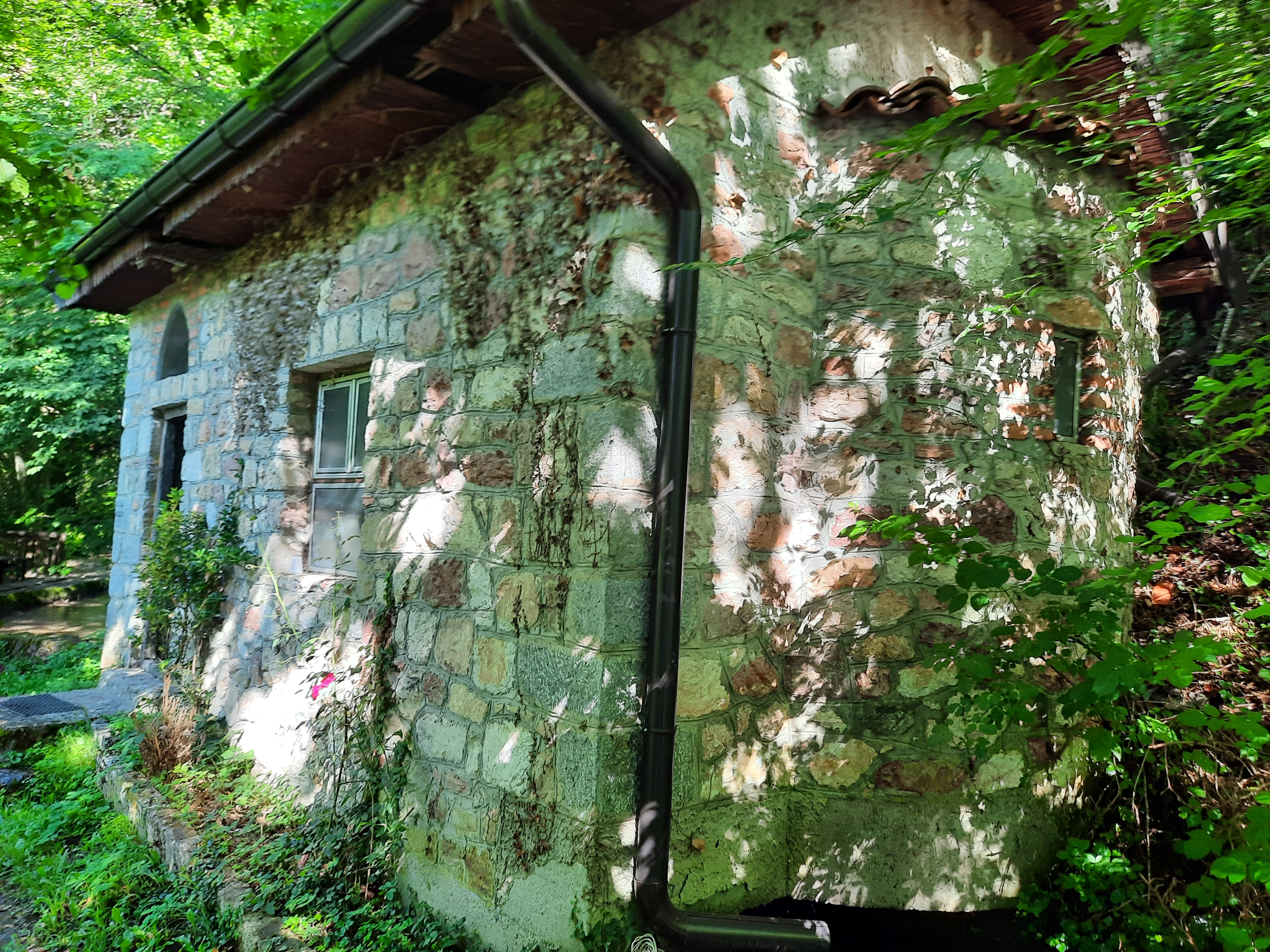
The temple in 2023

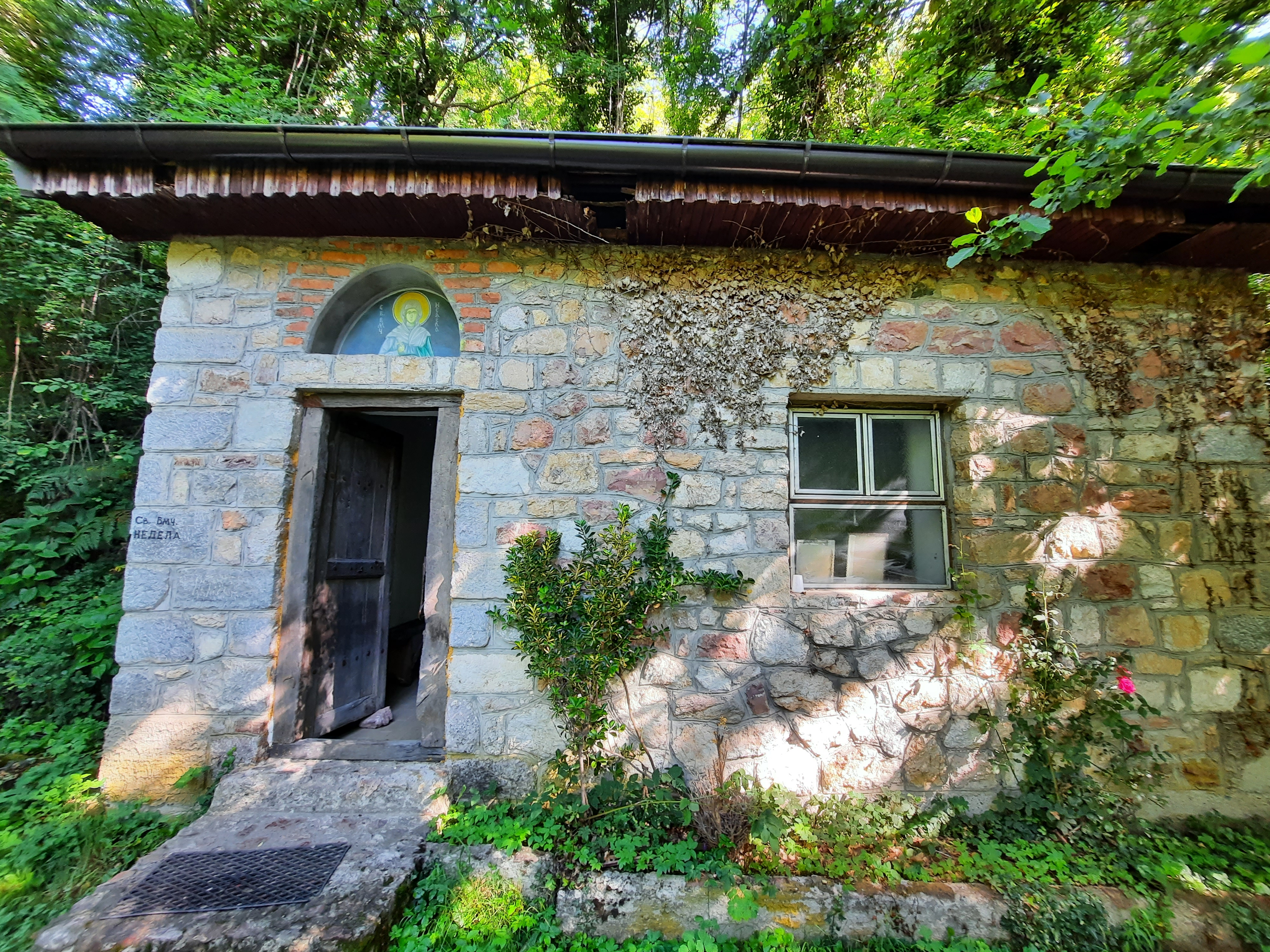
The temple in 2023

== See also ==
- St. Nicholas Church, Vevčani
- St. Barbara the Great Martyr and St. Sava of Jerusalem Church, Vevčani
- Ascension of Christ Lower Church, Vevčani
- Ascension of Christ Upper Church, Vevčani
- Dormition of the Theotokos Church, Vevčani
- St. George the Great Martyr and Victory Bearer Church, Vevčani
- St. Demetrius the Great Martyr Chapel, Vevčani
- St. Paraskevi the Venerable Chapel, Vevčani
- Mid-Pentecost Chapel, Vevčani
- Epiphany Chapel, Vevčani
