= St. Barbara the Great Martyr and St. Sava of Jerusalem Church, Vevčani =

St. Barbara the Great Martyr and St. Sava of Jerusalem Church
- Црква „Св. Великомаченица Варвара и Св. Сава Ерусалимски“
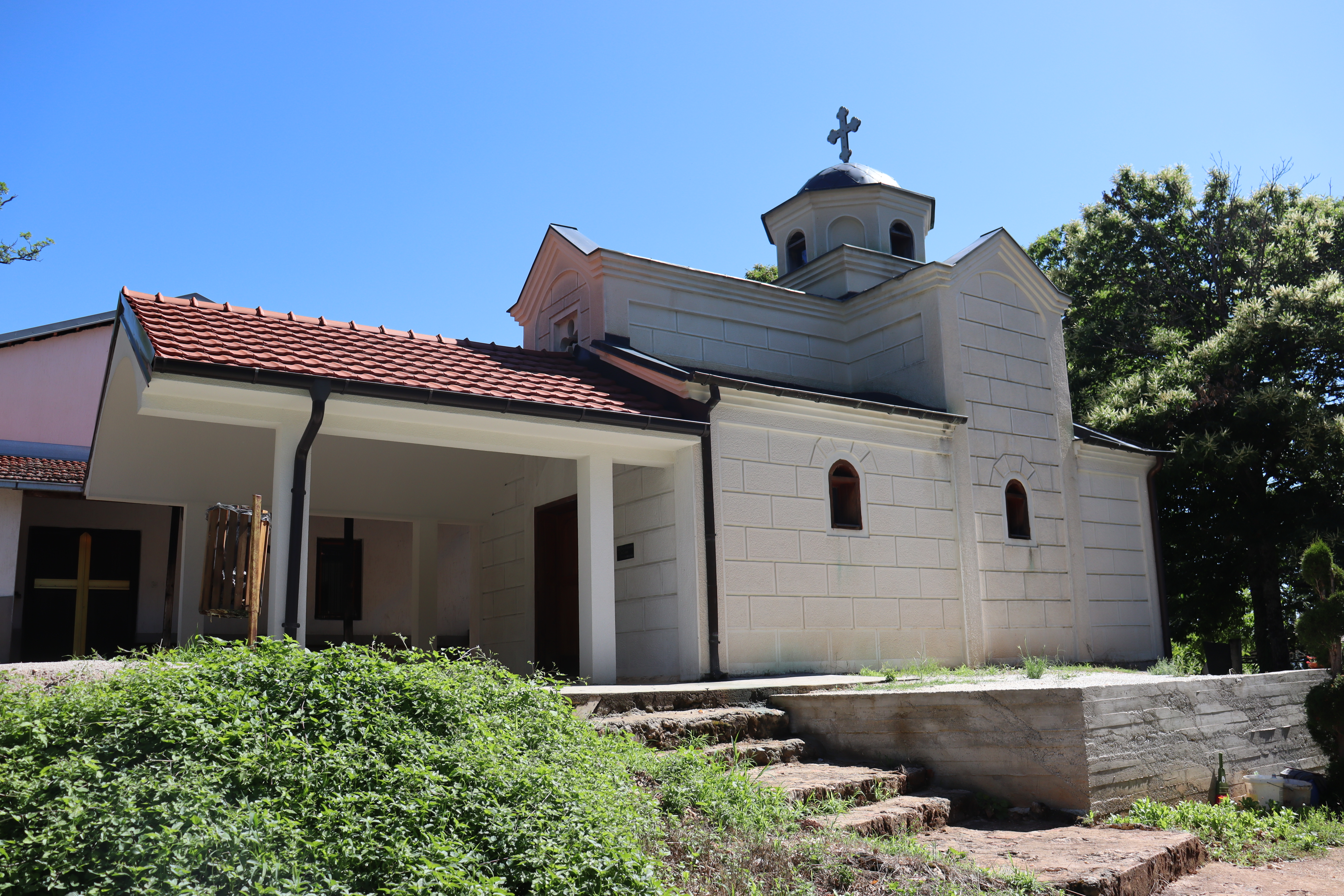
- The church in 2023
- St. Barbara the Great Martyr and St. Sava of Jerusalem Church
- 41.246944°N 20.594444°E
- Country: North Macedonia
- Denomination: Eastern Orthodox; Macedonian Orthodox Church
- Website: www.dke.org.mk

History
- Dedication: Saint Barbara, Saint Sava

Architecture
- Functional status: yes
- Completed: 1996 (newer building)

Administration
- Diocese: Debar and Kičevo Diocese
- Parish: Vevčani Parish

The St. Barbara the Great Martyr and St. Sava of Jerusalem Church is a Macedonian Orthodox cemetery church in the village of Vevčani.

== Location ==
The church is located north of Vevčani, on a small hill, in the middle of an oak forest. Among these trees there are several centuries-old trunks, which indicates the age of this sanctuary.

== History ==
In the past, this church was a chapel, which in addition to the original name of the church dedicated to Saint Barbara, during the Kingdom of Yugoslavia rule, the Saint Sava name was also added.

== Gallery ==
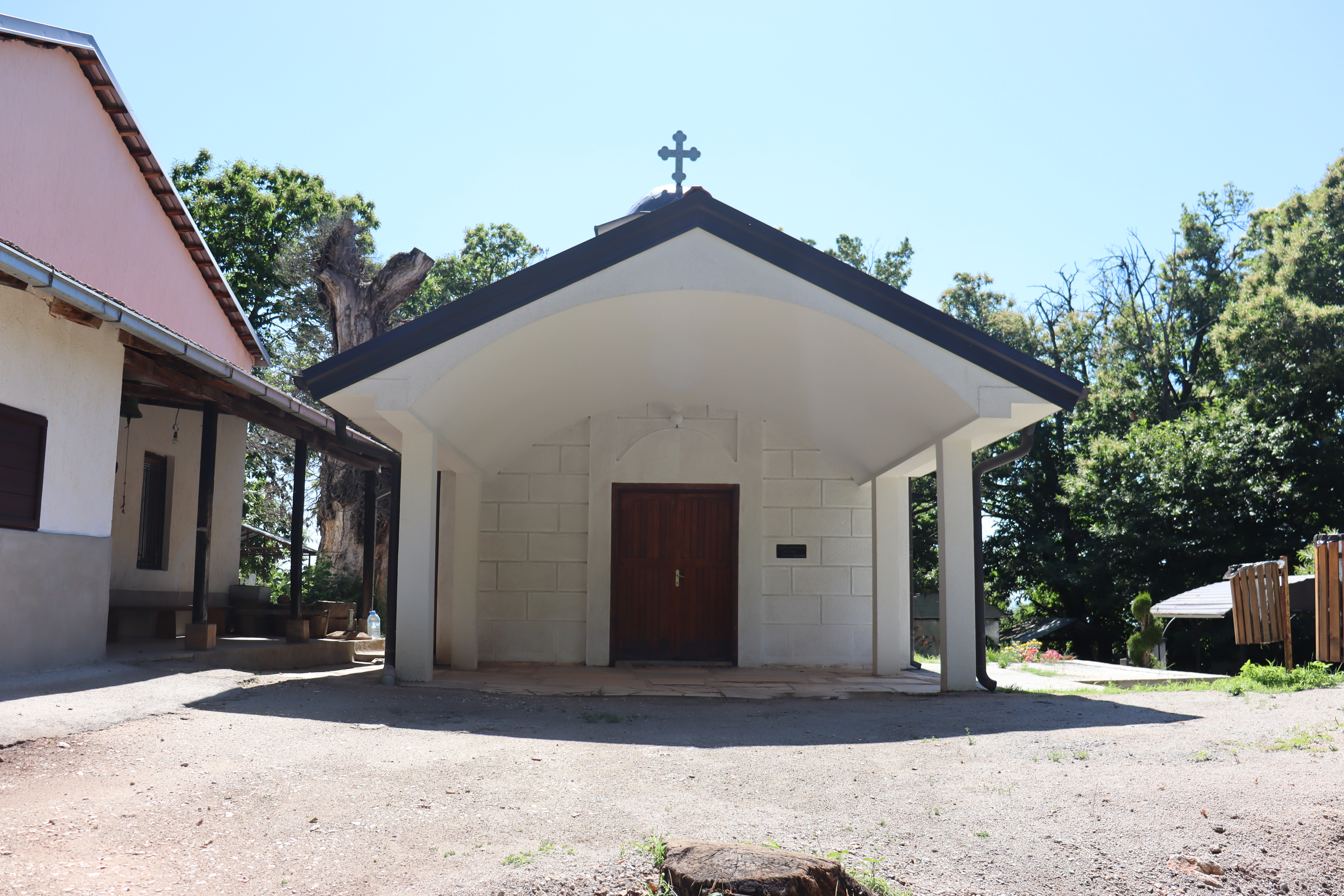

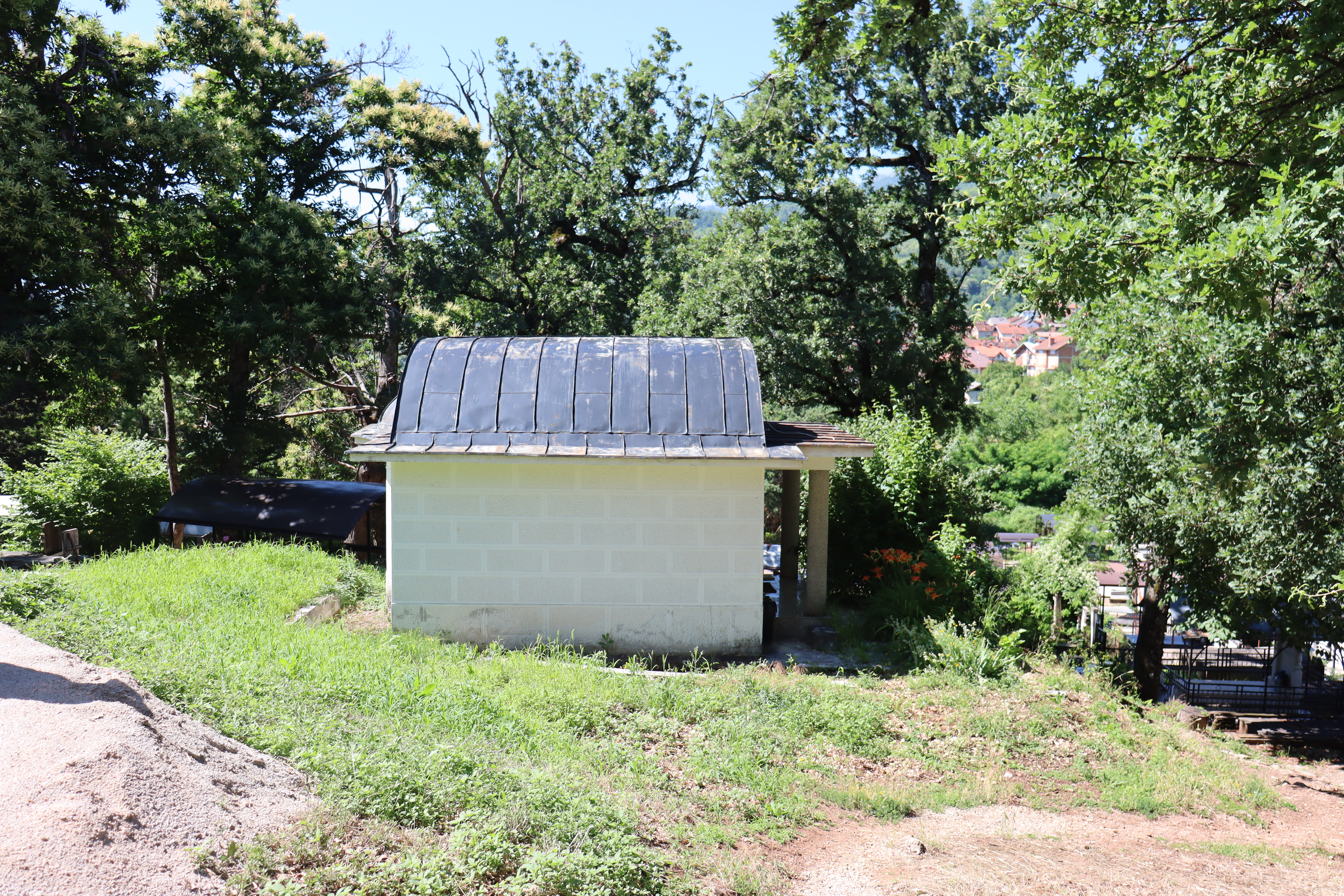

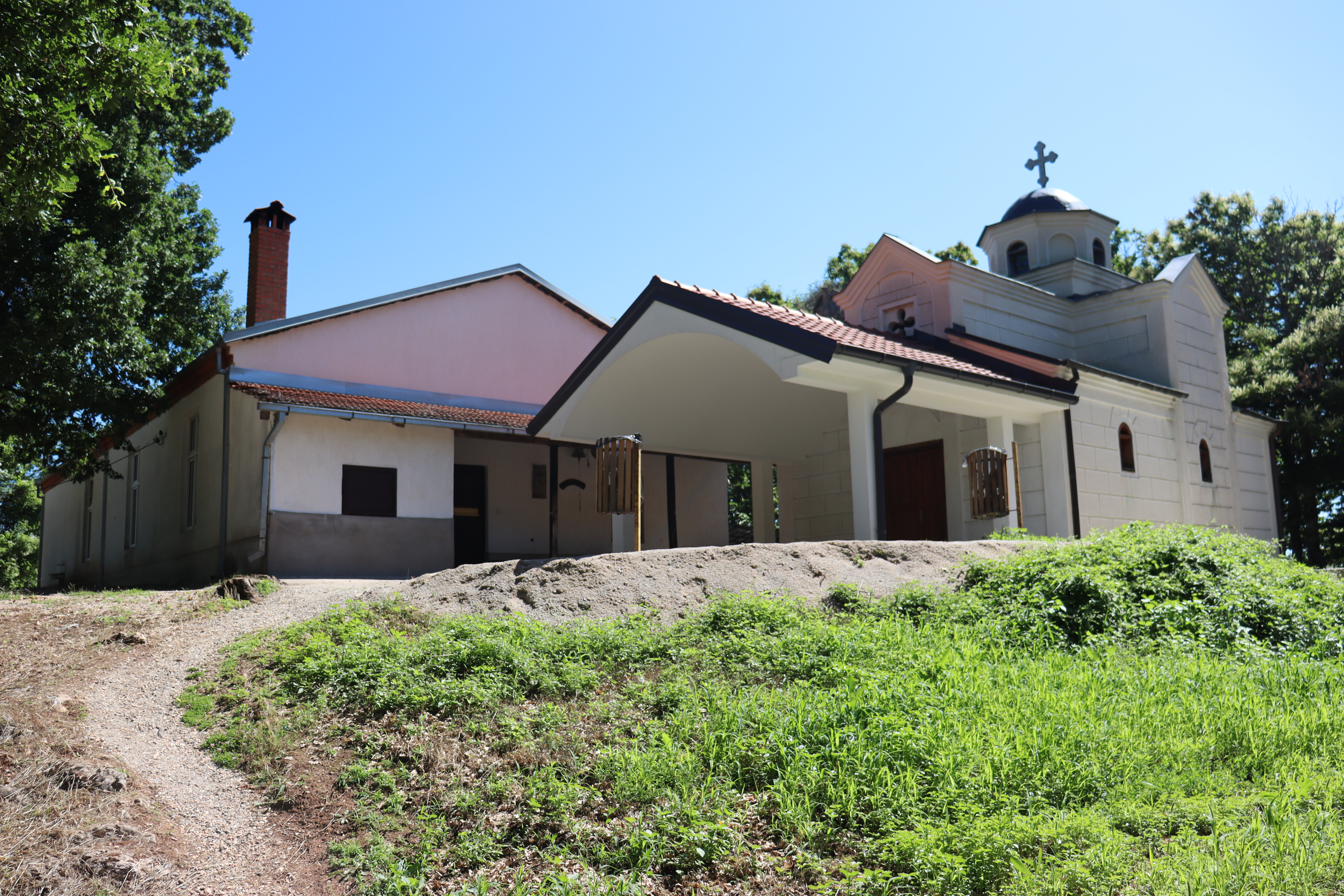

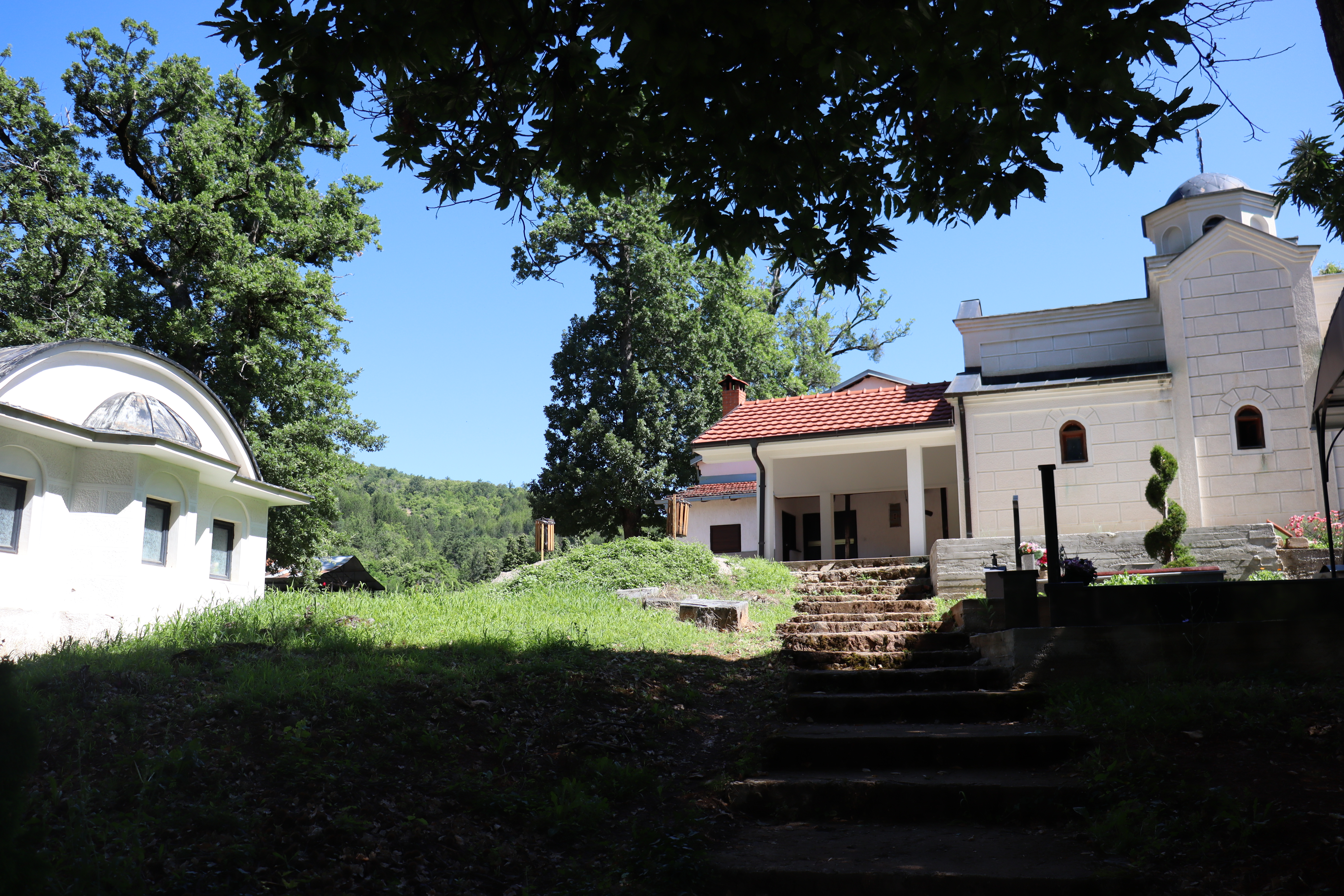

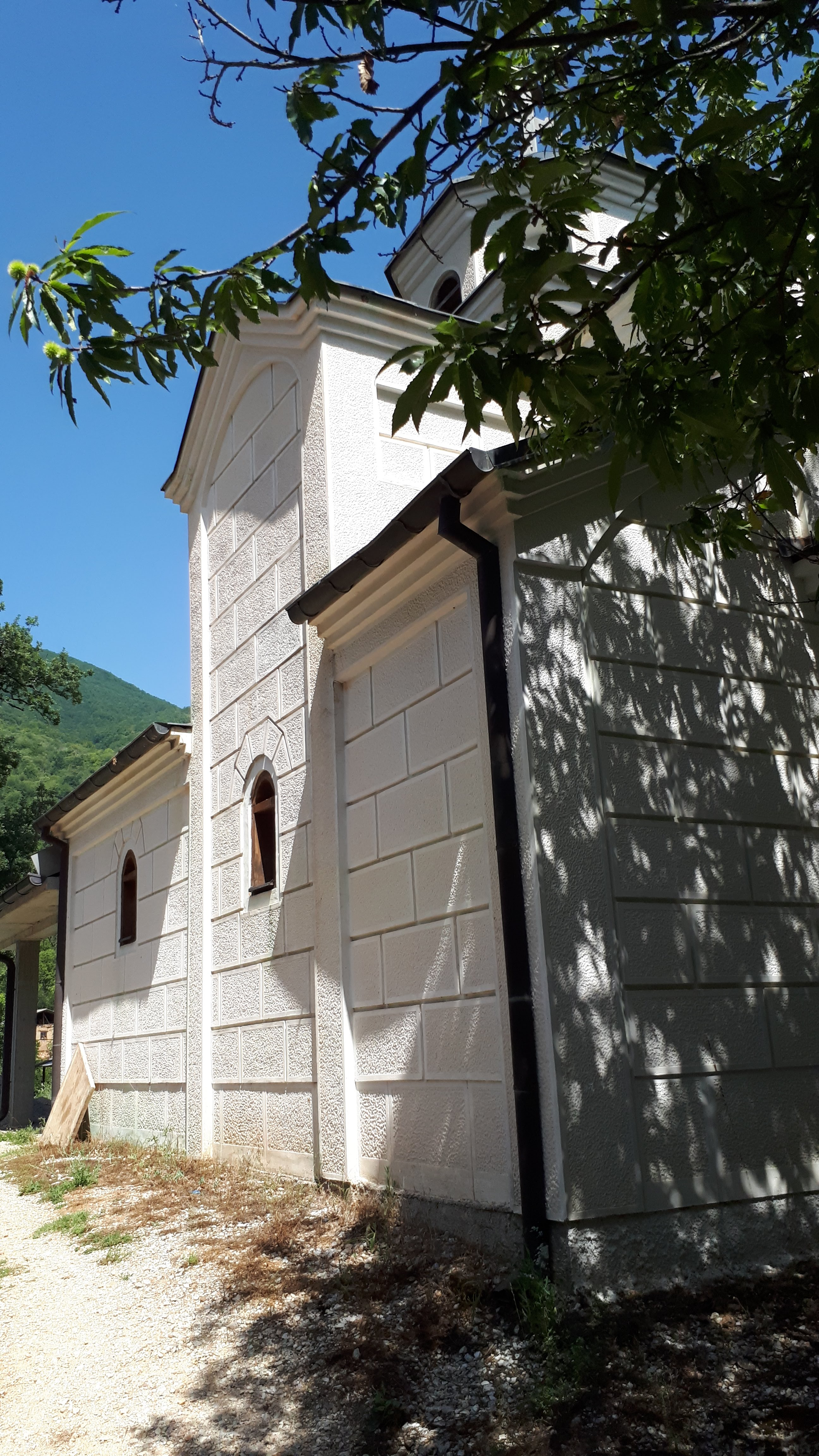
Side view of the church

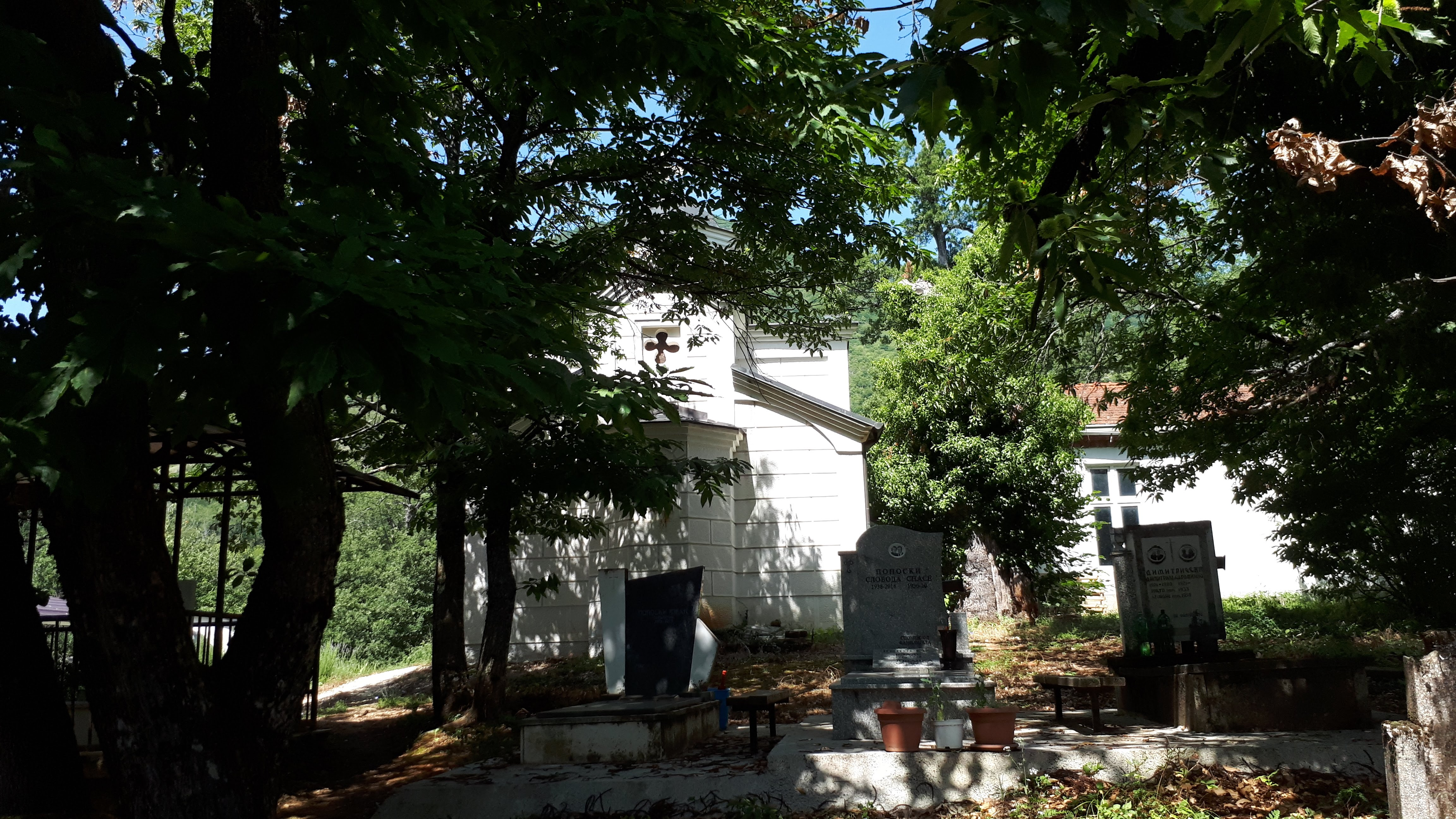

== See also ==
- St. Nicholas Church, Vevčani
- Ascension of Christ Lower Church, Vevčani
- Ascension of Christ Upper Church, Vevčani
- Dormition of the Theotokos Church, Vevčani
- St. George the Great Martyr and Victory Bearer Church, Vevčani
- St. Demetrius the Great Martyr Chapel, Vevčani
- St. Paraskevi the Venerable Chapel, Vevčani
- Mid-Pentecost Chapel, Vevčani
- St. Kyriaki Chapel, Vevčani
- Epiphany Chapel, Vevčani
