= Epiphany Chapel, Vevčani =

Wayside chapel in Vevčani, North Macedonia

Epiphany Chapel
- Параклис „Богојавление“
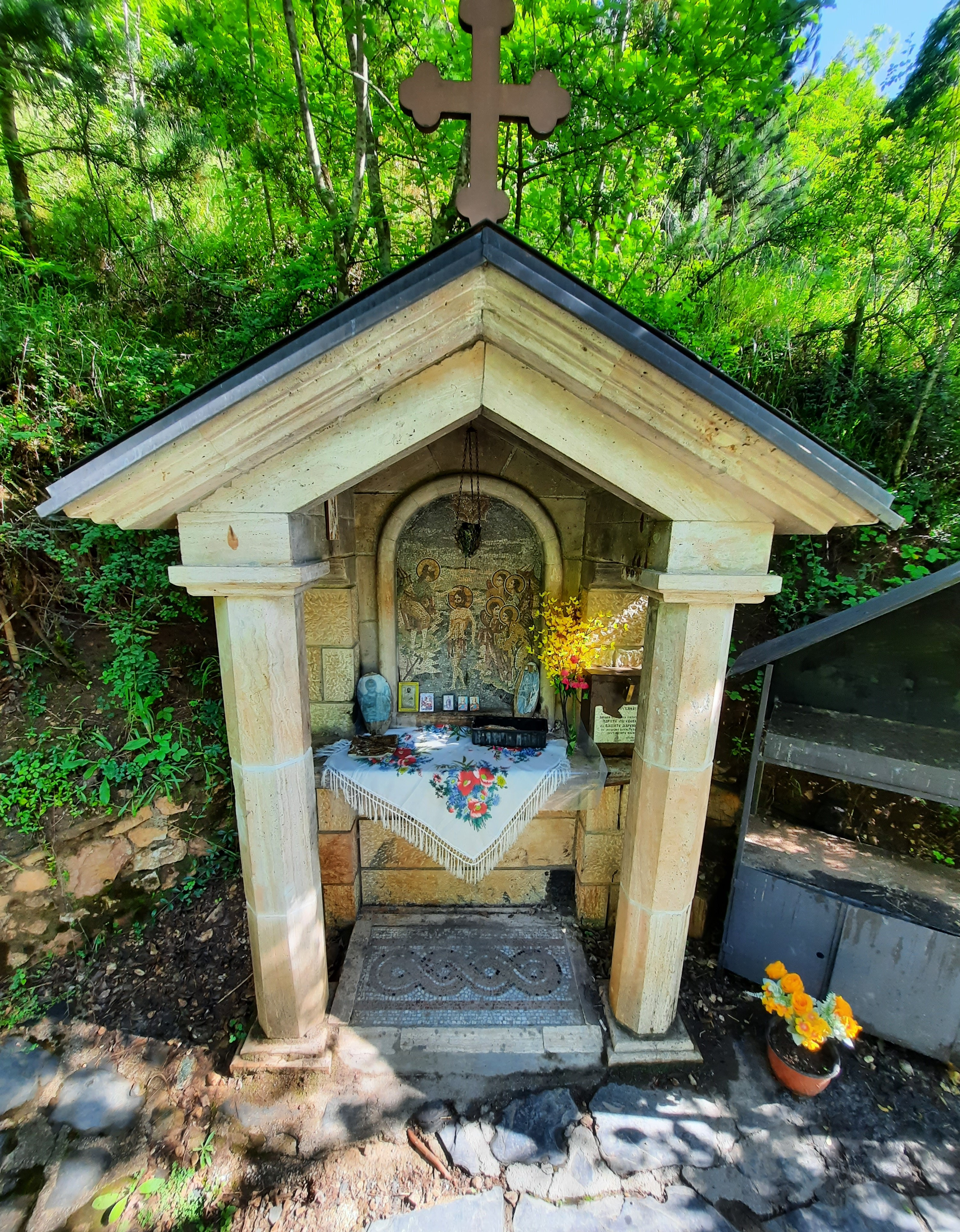
- The temple in 2023
- Epiphany Chapel
- 41.239708°N 20.584622°E
- Location: Vevčani
- Country: North Macedonia
- Denomination: Eastern Orthodox; Macedonian Orthodox Church
- Website: www.dke.org.mk

History
- Dedication: Epiphany

Architecture
- Functional status: yes

Administration
- Diocese: Debar and Kičevo Diocese
- Parish: Vevčani Parish

The Epiphany Chapel is a Macedonian Orthodox wayside shrine, colloquially referred to as a chapel, in the village of Vevčani.

== Location ==
The church is located within Vevčani Springs in the locality/area called Izvor. Nearby, in the river, every year on Epiphany day, the cross is thrown to be caught by the believers.

== Gallery ==
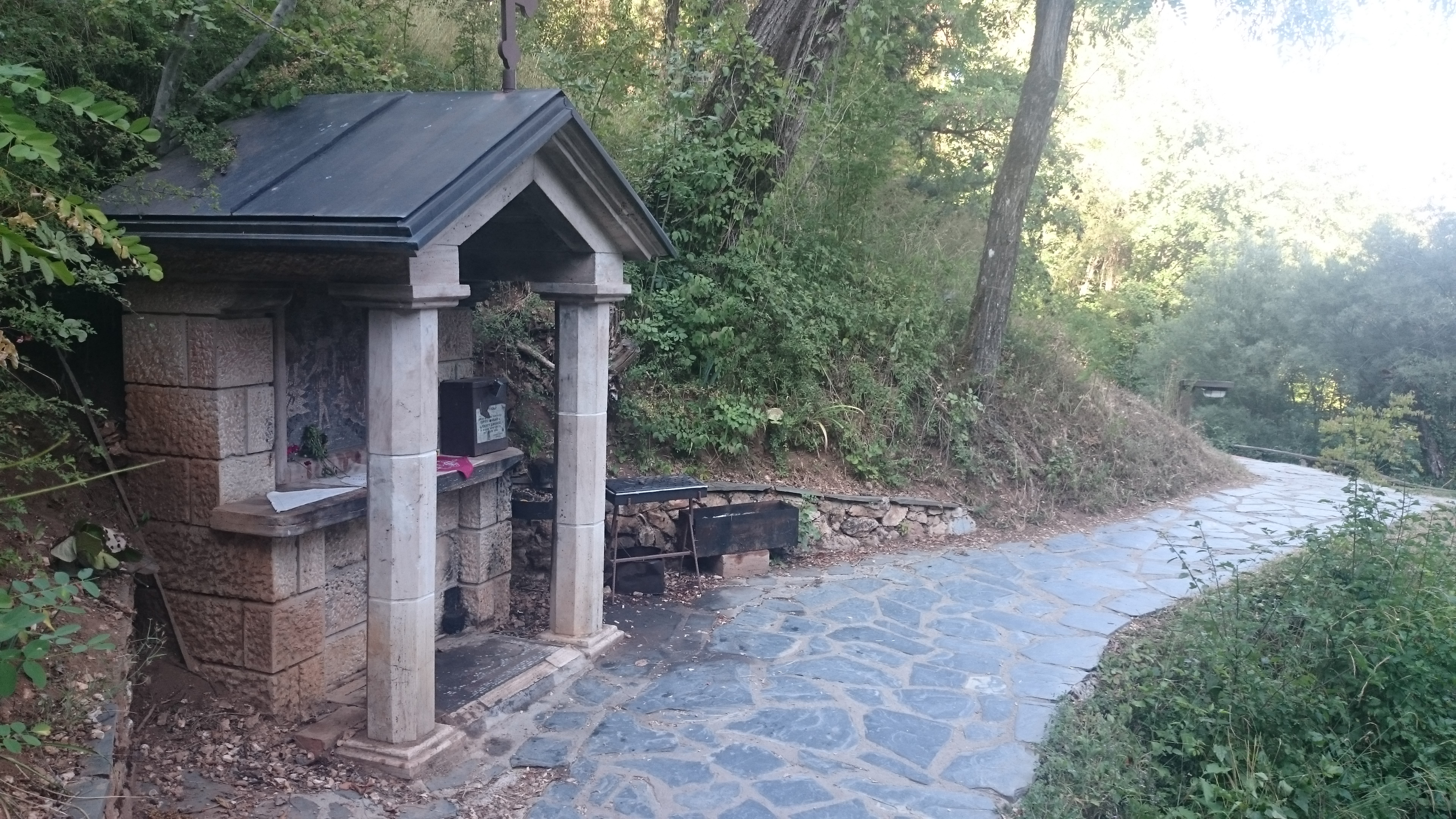
The temple in 2015

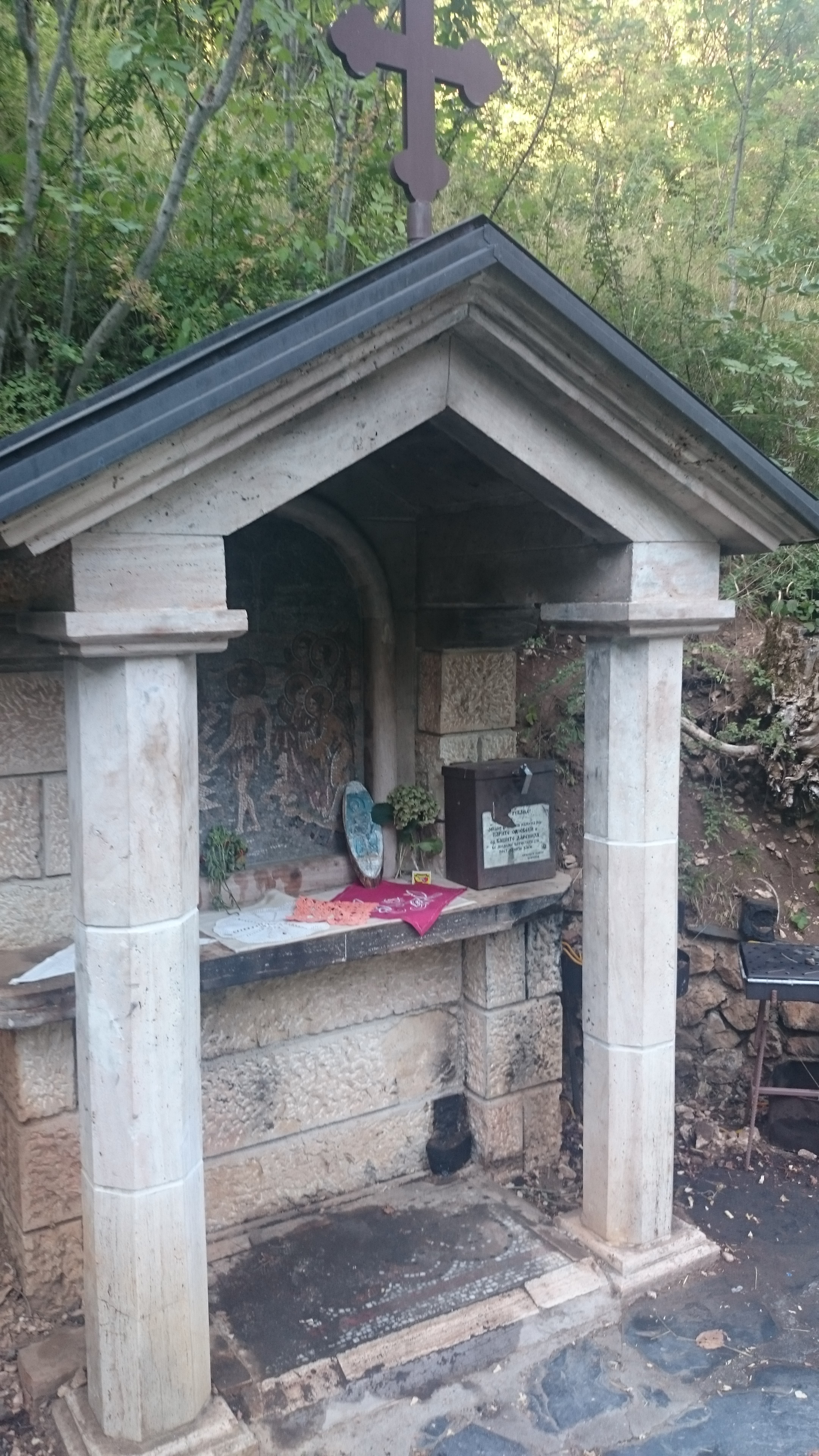
The temple in 2015

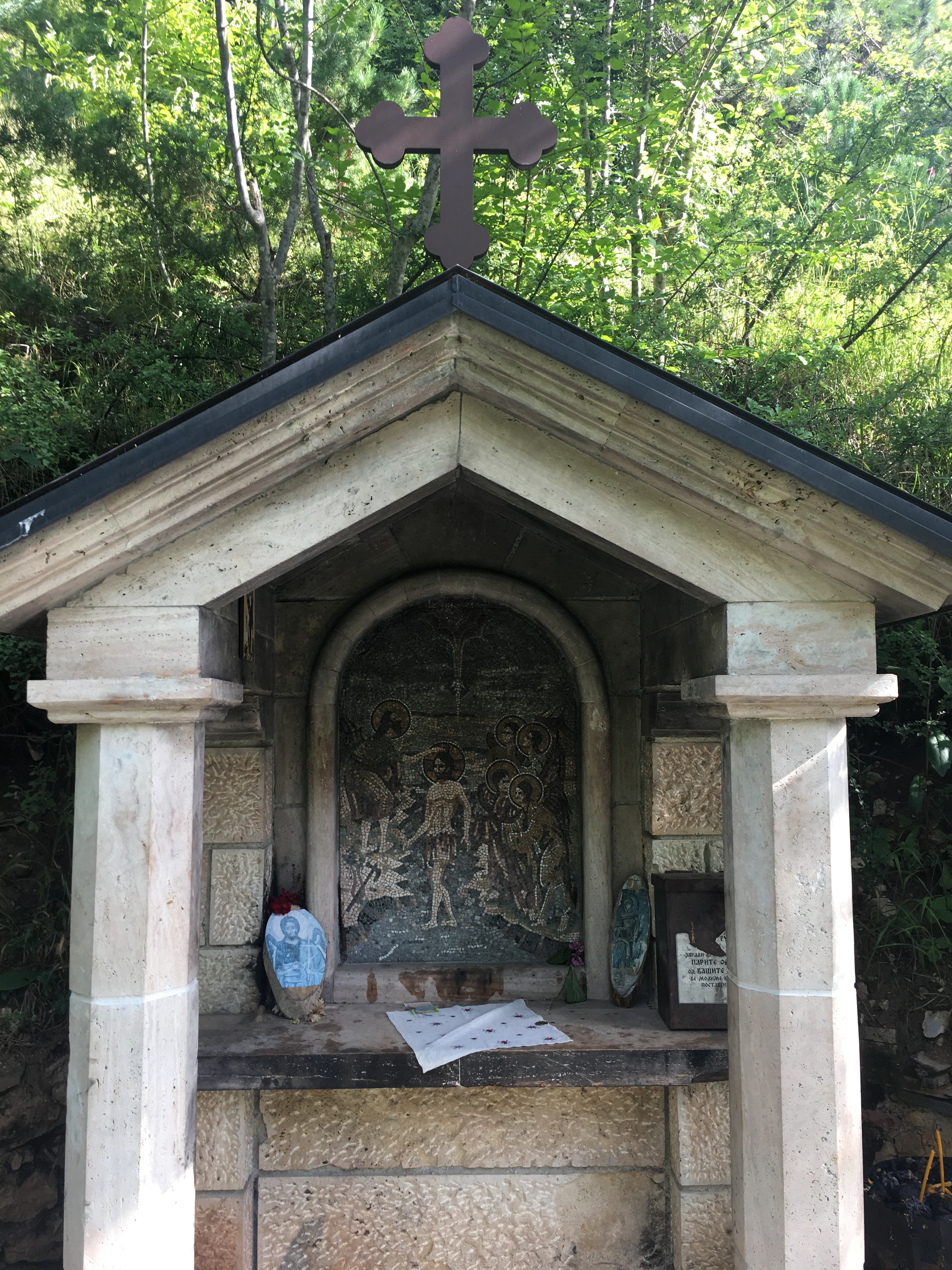
The temple in 2018

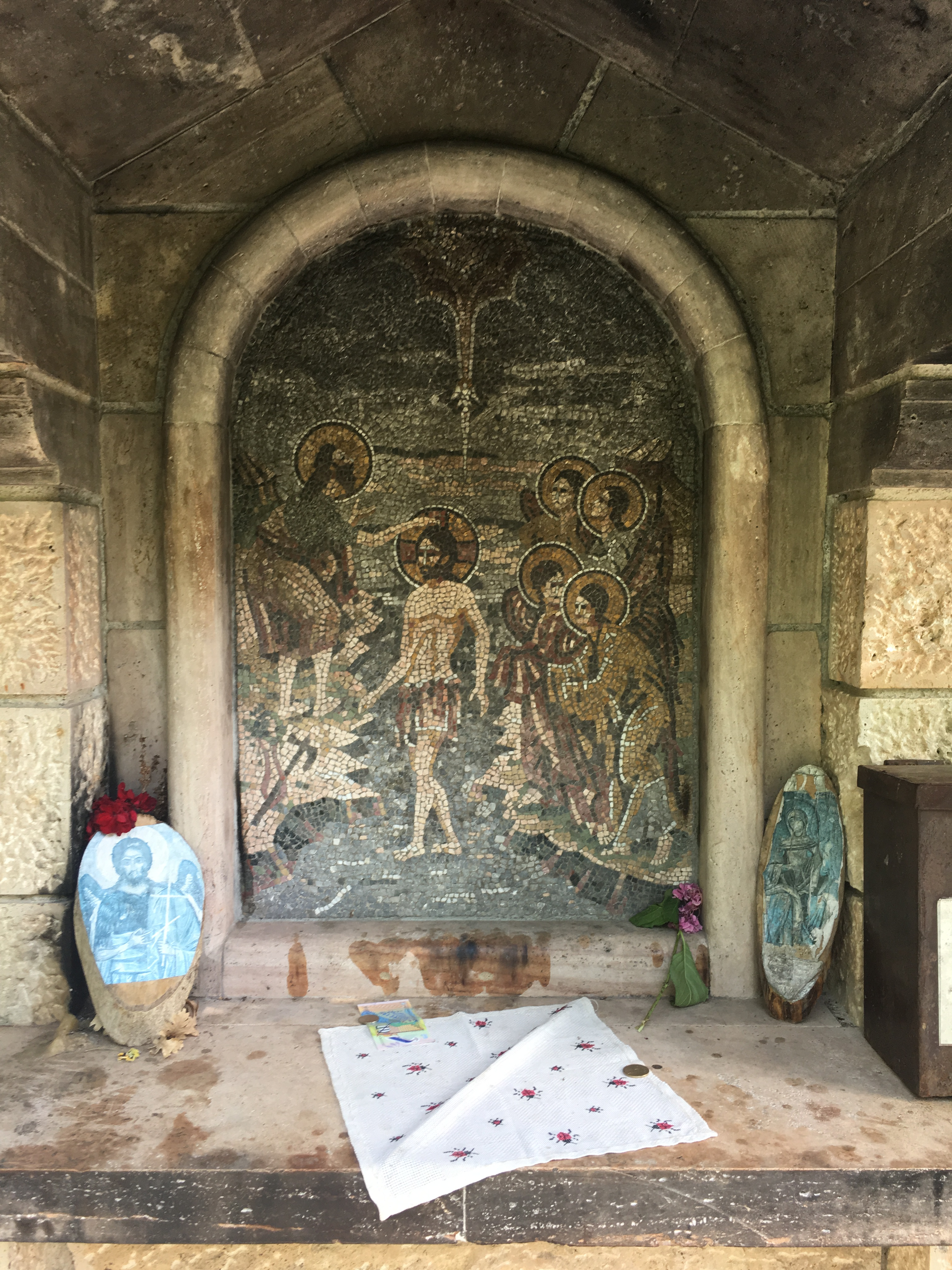
The temple in 2018

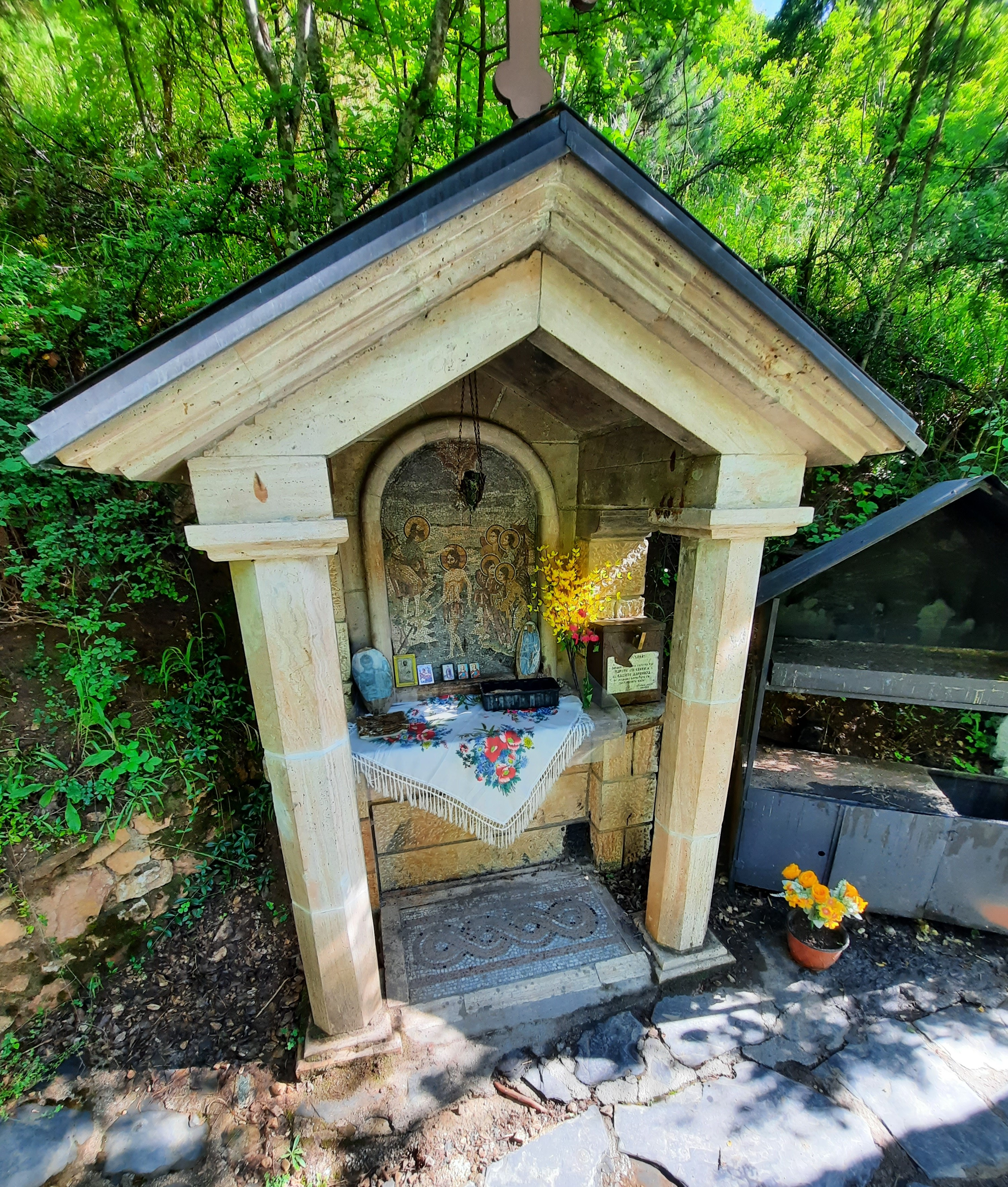
The temple in 2023

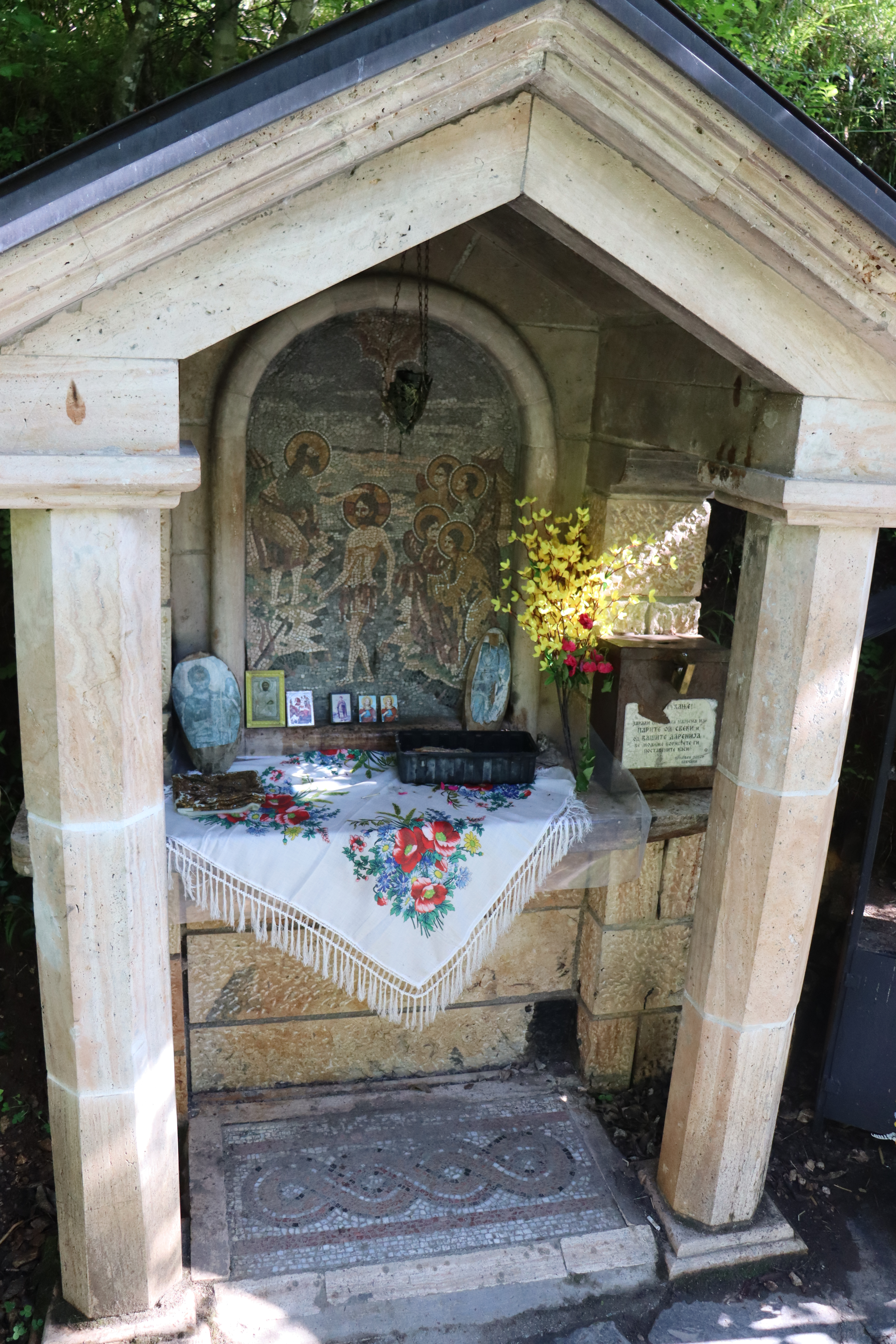
The temple in 2023

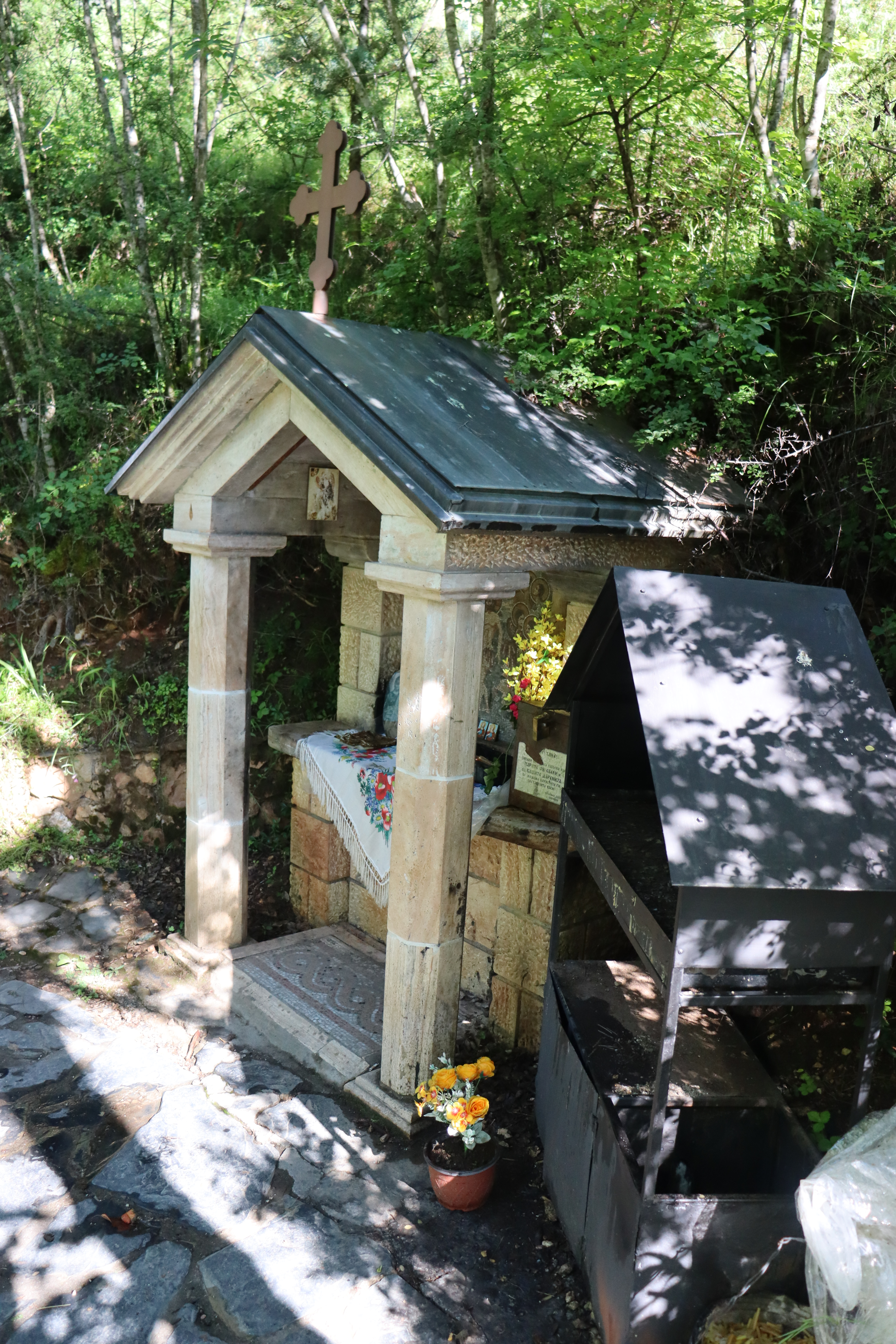
The temple in 2023

== See also ==
- St. Nicholas Church, Vevčani
- St. Barbara the Great Martyr and St. Sava of Jerusalem Church, Vevčani
- Ascension of Christ Lower Church, Vevčani
- Ascension of Christ Upper Church, Vevčani
- Dormition of the Theotokos Church, Vevčani
- St. George the Great Martyr and Victory Bearer Church, Vevčani
- St. Demetrius the Great Martyr Chapel, Vevčani
- St. Paraskevi the Venerable Chapel, Vevčani
- Mid-Pentecost Chapel, Vevčani
- St. Kyriaki Chapel, Vevčani
