= Dormition of the Theotokos Church, Vevčani =

Church building in Vevčani, North Macedonia

Dormition of the Theotokos Church
- Црква „Успение на Пресвета Богородица“
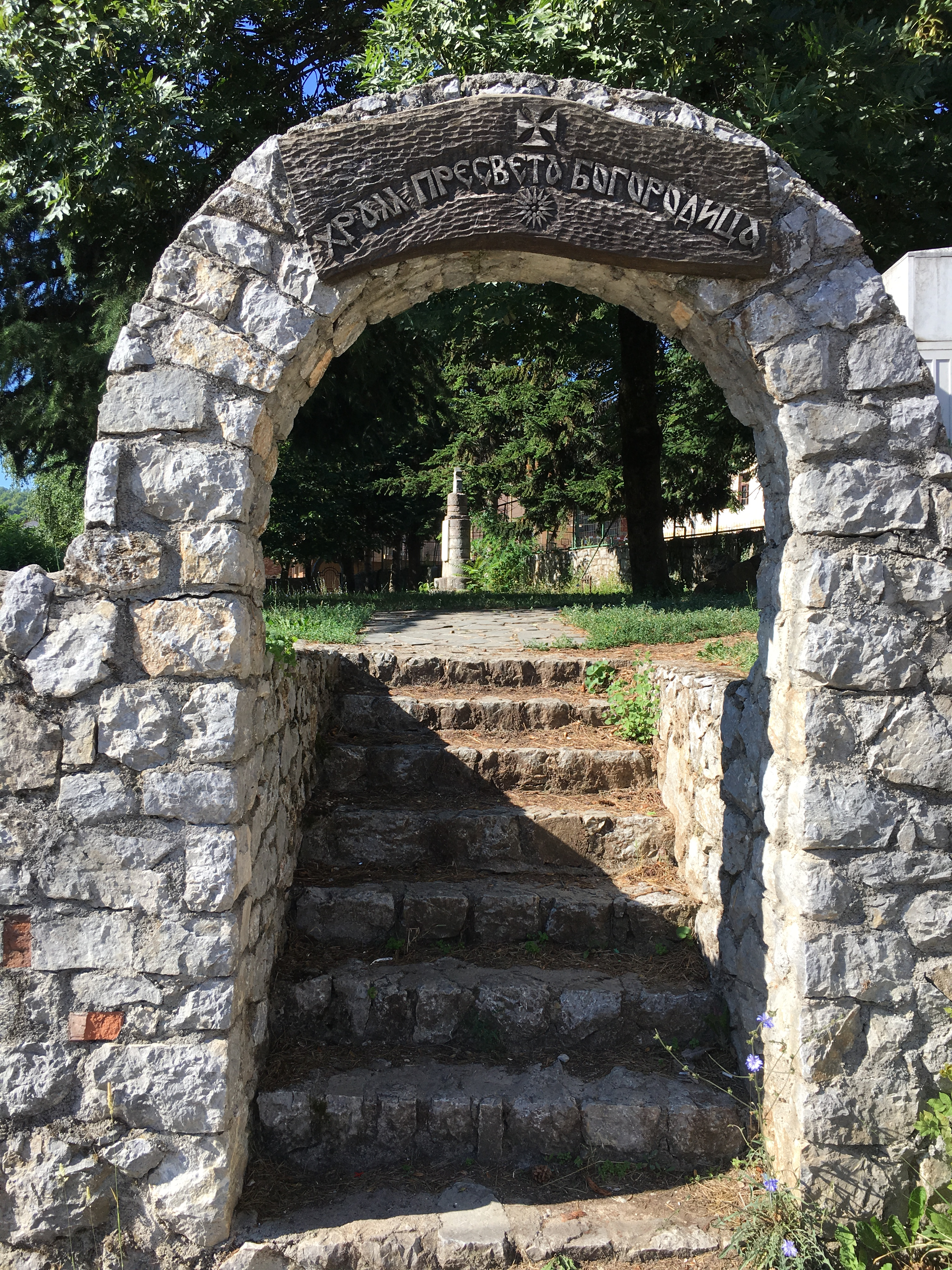
- The church yard's entrance in 2018
- Dormition of the Theotokos Church
- 41.240033°N 20.592944°E
- Country: North Macedonia
- Denomination: Eastern Orthodox; Macedonian Orthodox Church
- Website: www.dke.org.mk

History
- Dedication: Dormition of the Theotokos

Architecture
- Functional status: no

Administration
- Diocese: Debar and Kičevo Diocese
- Parish: Vevčani Parish

The Dormition of the Theotokos Church is a Macedonian Orthodox former church in the village of Vevčani.

== Location ==
The church is located near the very center of Vevčani, in close proximity to the old school building which today is the Kosta Srbakoski Multicultural Center. The church was entered through two larger gates, from the east and from the west, and there were other smaller entrances and stairs on the north side, which were used on other occasions. Today, there are visible traces of the church in the center of Vevčani.

== History ==
The church existed a long time ago, but the Ottomans demolished it. In the same place, the people of Vevčani started building a new church in the period 1921–1928.

== Architecture ==
The church was built more than 1.5 meters in height (up to the windows level), but due to a lack of funds, the construction was stopped.

== Gallery ==
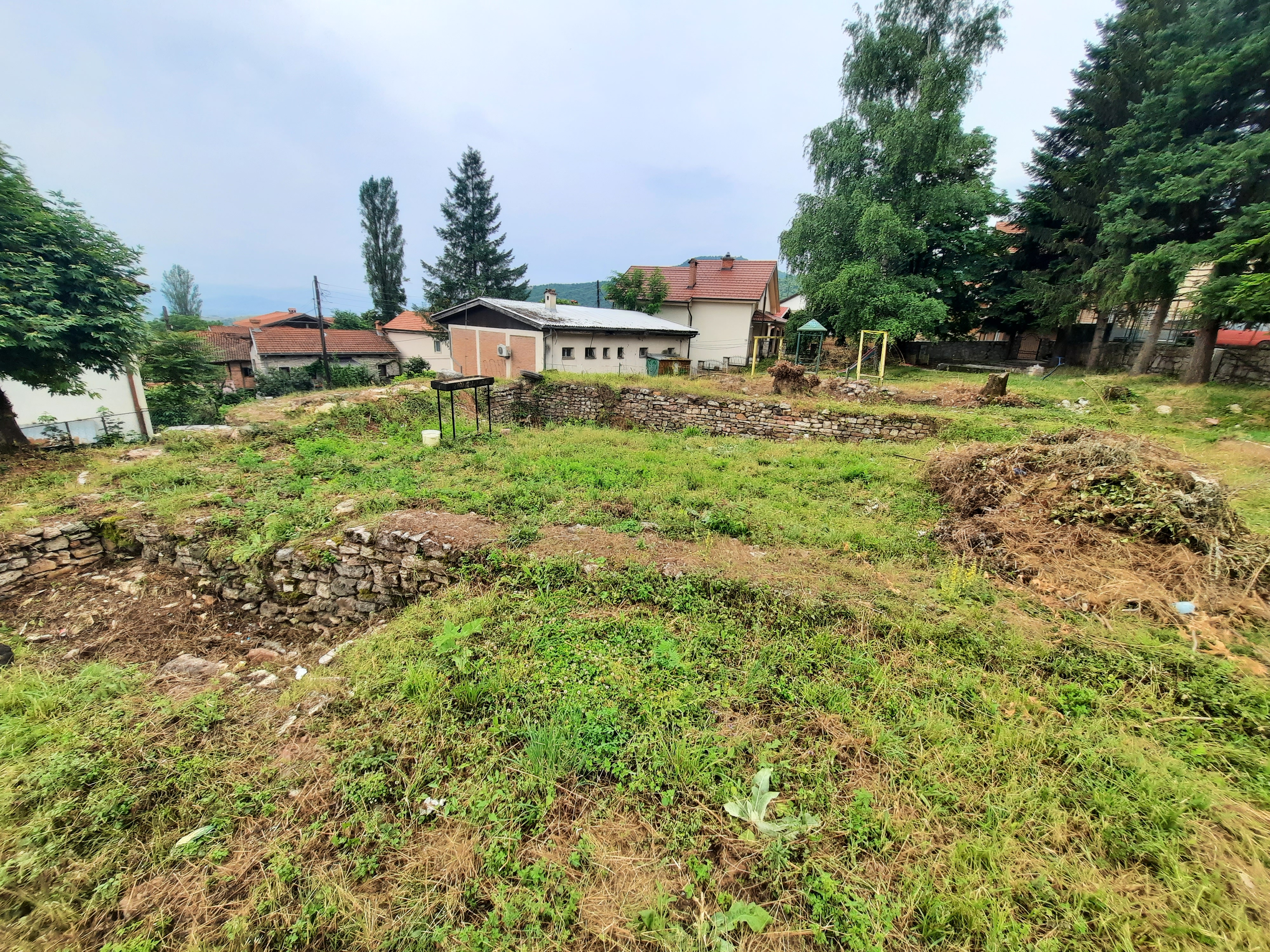
The foundations as remains

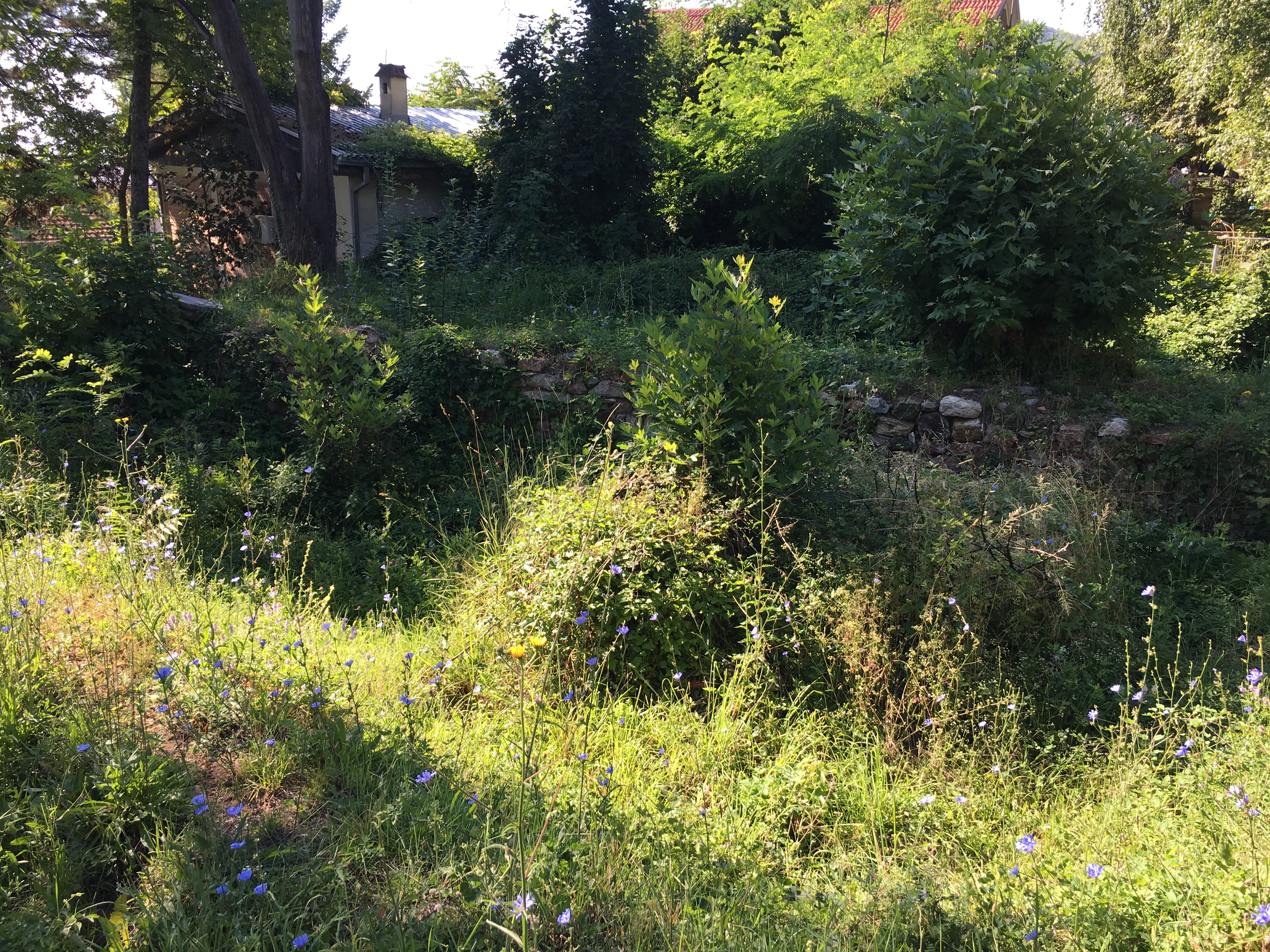
The unfinished church building

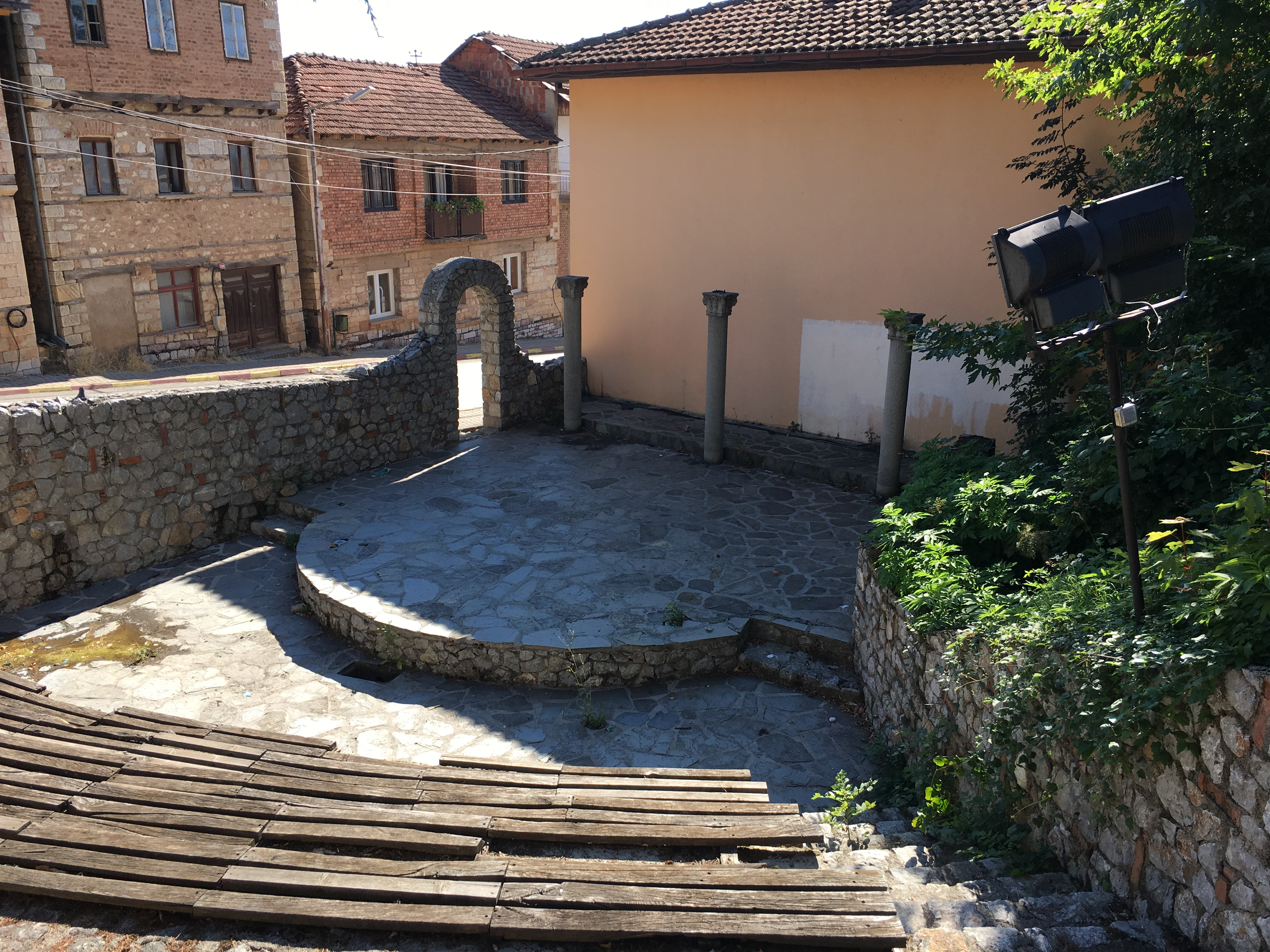
The recent built amphitheater near the church site

== See also ==
- St. Nicholas Church, Vevčani
- St. Barbara the Great Martyr and St. Sava of Jerusalem Church, Vevčani
- Ascension of Christ Lower Church, Vevčani
- Ascension of Christ Upper Church, Vevčani
- St. George the Great Martyr and Victory Bearer Church, Vevčani
- St. Demetrius the Great Martyr Chapel, Vevčani
- St. Paraskevi the Venerable Chapel, Vevčani
- Mid-Pentecost Chapel, Vevčani
- St. Kyriaki Chapel, Vevčani
- Epiphany Chapel, Vevčani
