= Ascension of Christ Lower Church, Vevčani =

Ascension of Christ Lower Church
- Црква „Св. Спас Долни“ / Црква „Вознесение Христово“
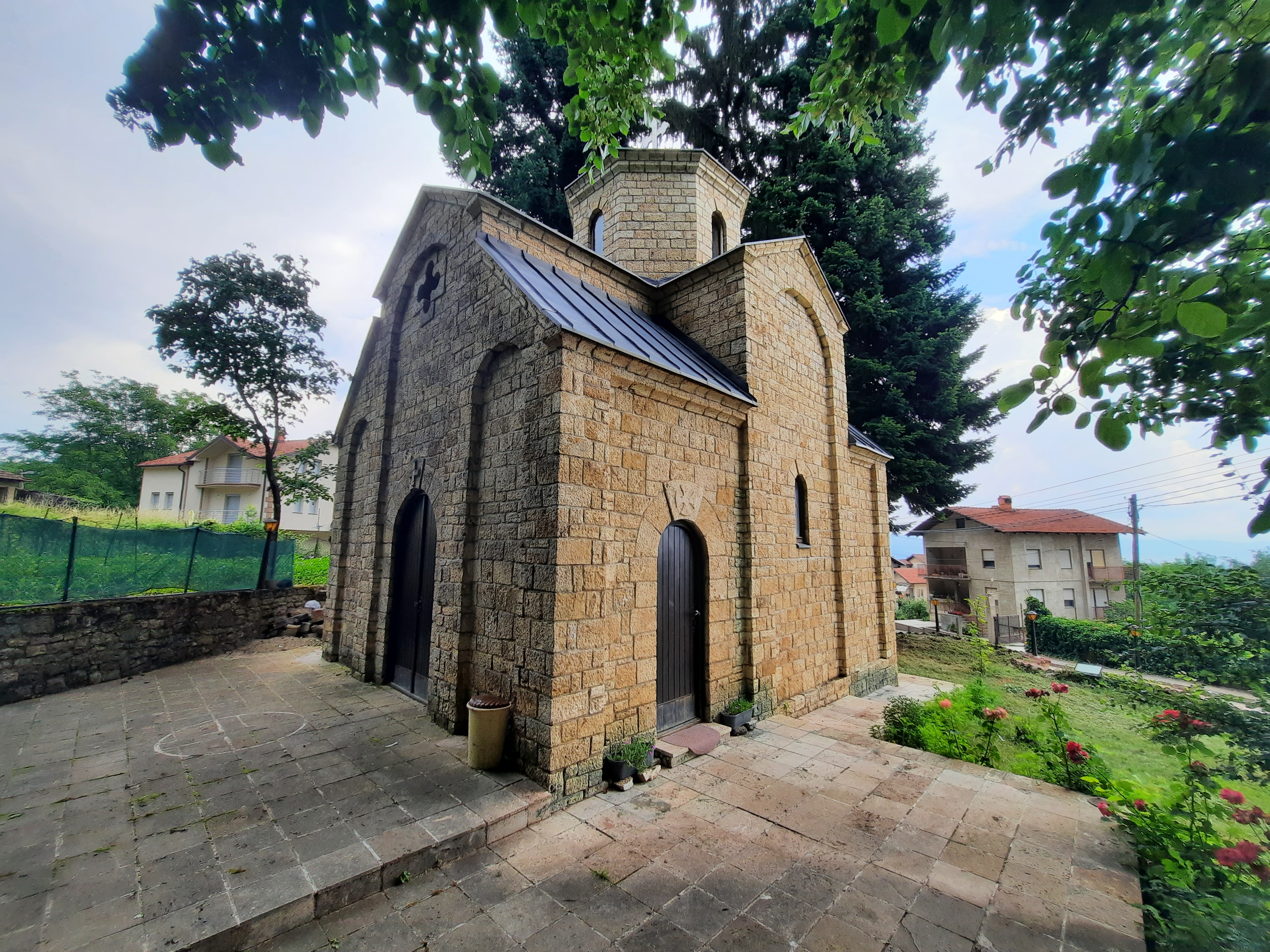
- The church in 2023
- Ascension of Christ Lower Church
- 41.241842°N 20.596386°E
- Country: North Macedonia
- Denomination: Eastern Orthodox; Macedonian Orthodox Church
- Website: www.dke.org.mk

History
- Dedication: Saint Barbara, Saint Sava

Architecture
- Functional status: yes
- Groundbreaking: 1986 (newer building)
- Completed: 1996 (newer building)

Administration
- Diocese: Debar and Kičevo Diocese
- Parish: Vevčani Parish

The Ascension of Christ Lower Church is a Macedonian Orthodox church in the village of Vevčani.

== Location ==
The church is located while entering in Vevčani, on its northeastern side.

== History ==
It was built on a holy place, at first only as a wooden construction as a chapel, and after the renovation from 1986 to 1996 it is a building of a church made of hewn stone.

== Gallery ==
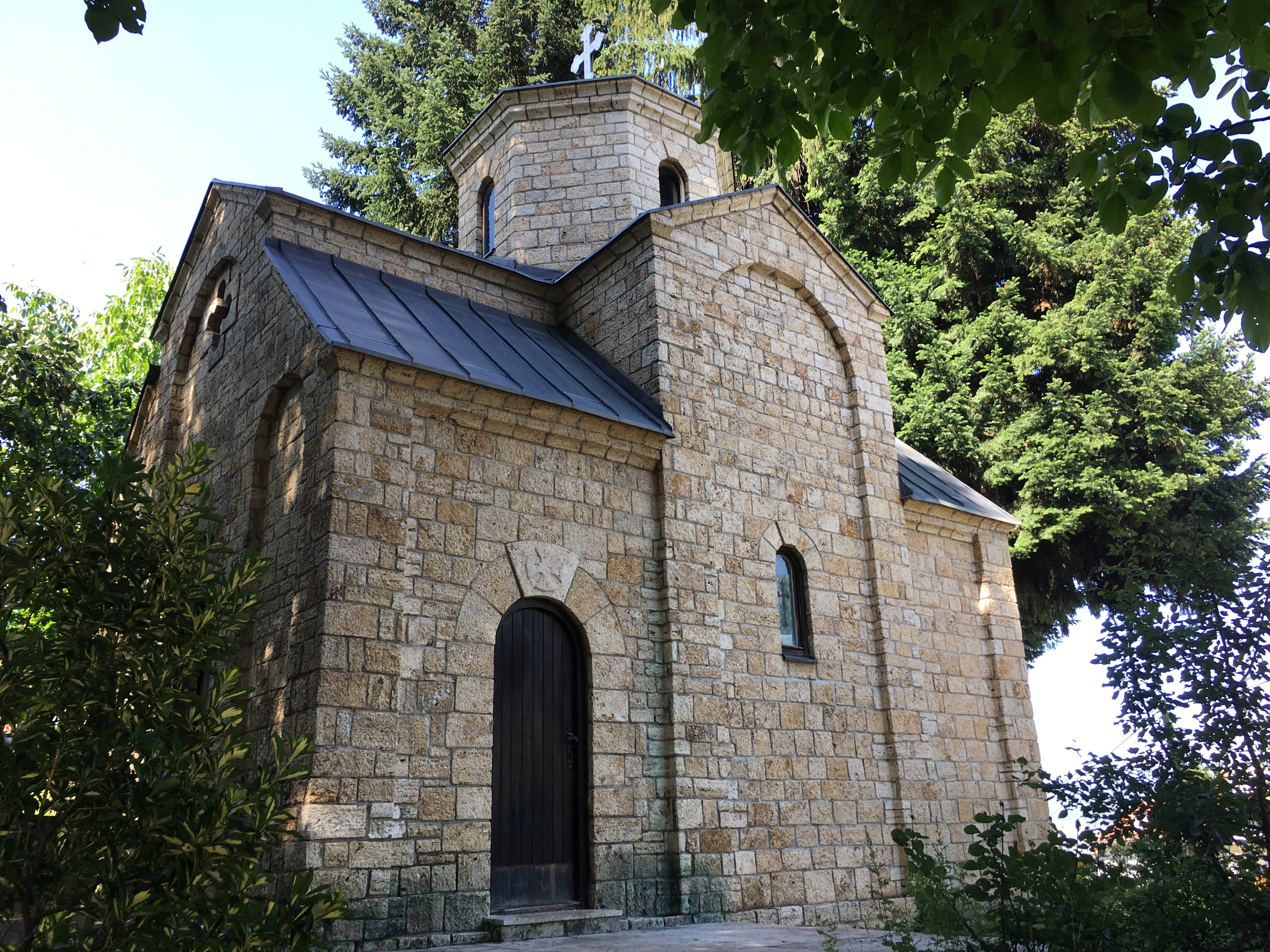
The Church in 2018

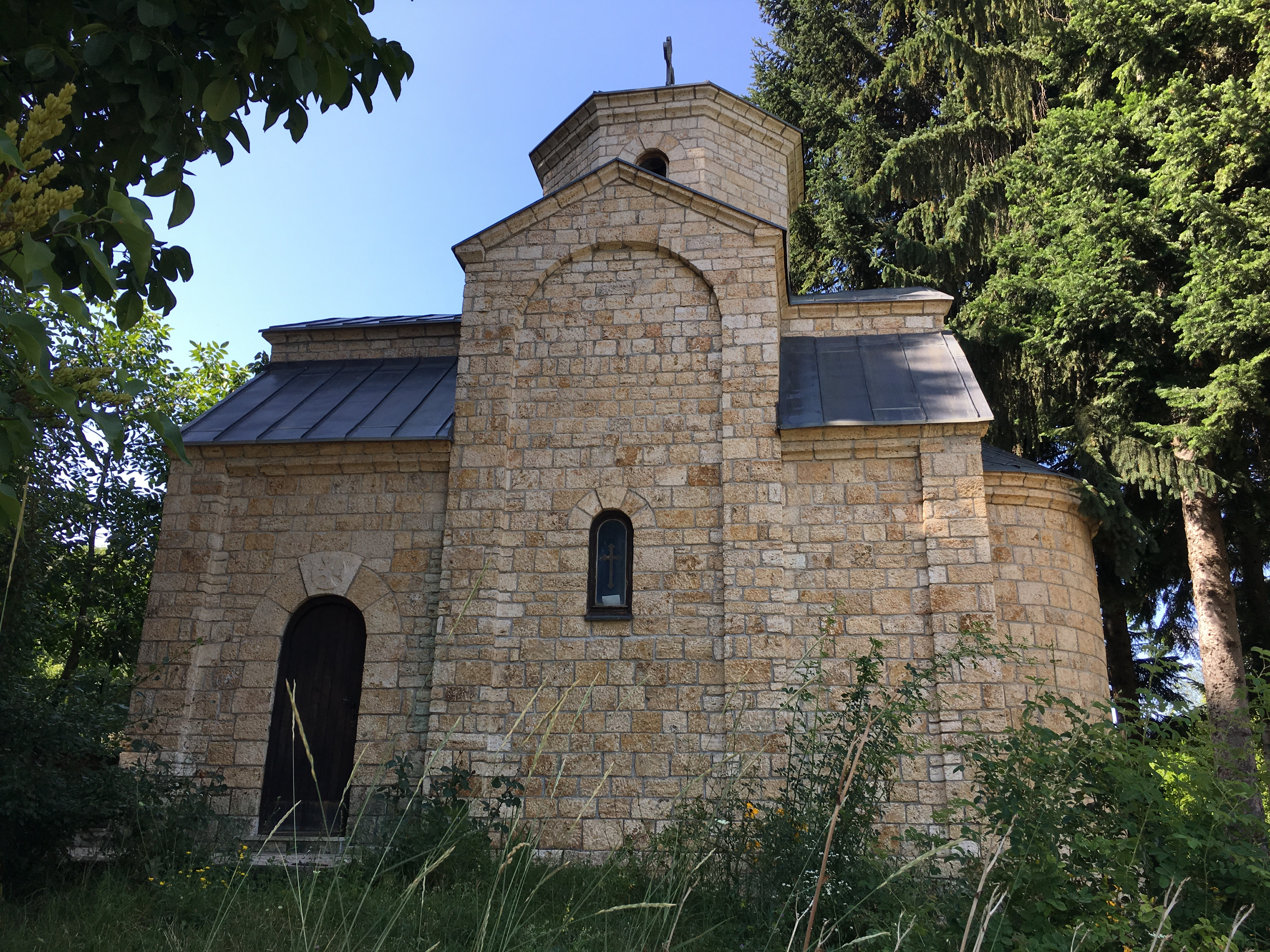
The Church in 2018

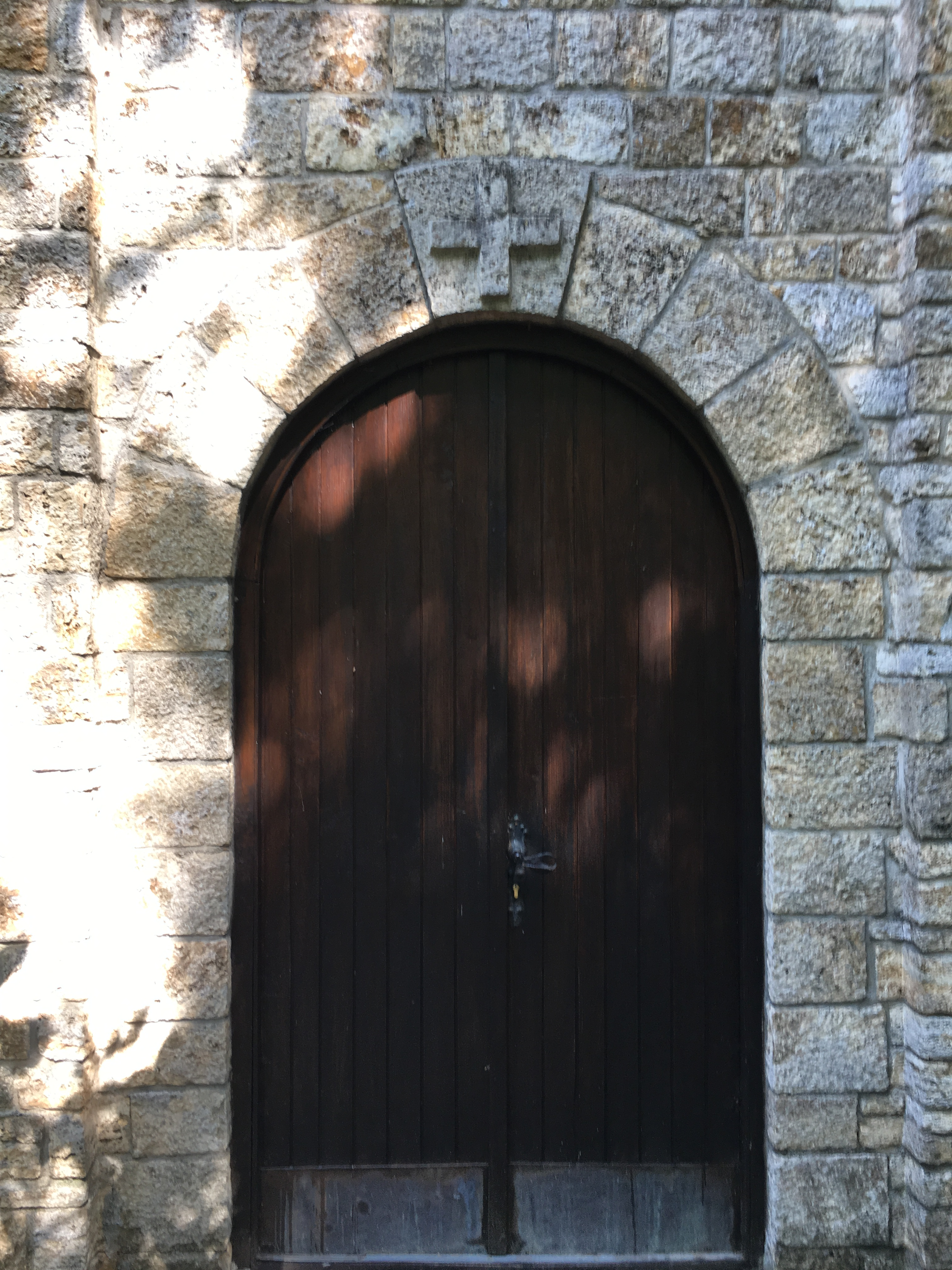
The Church in 2018

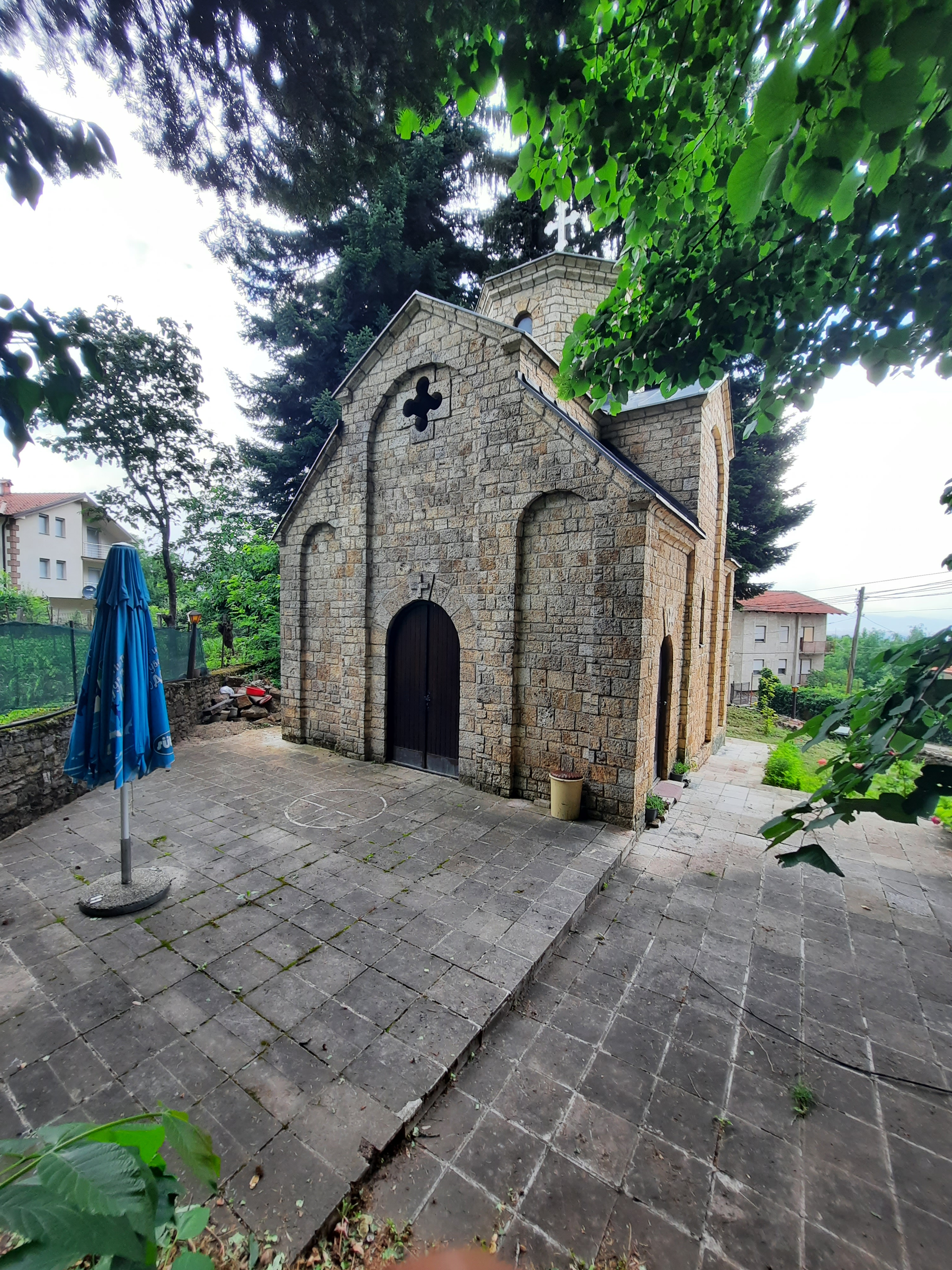
The Church in 2023

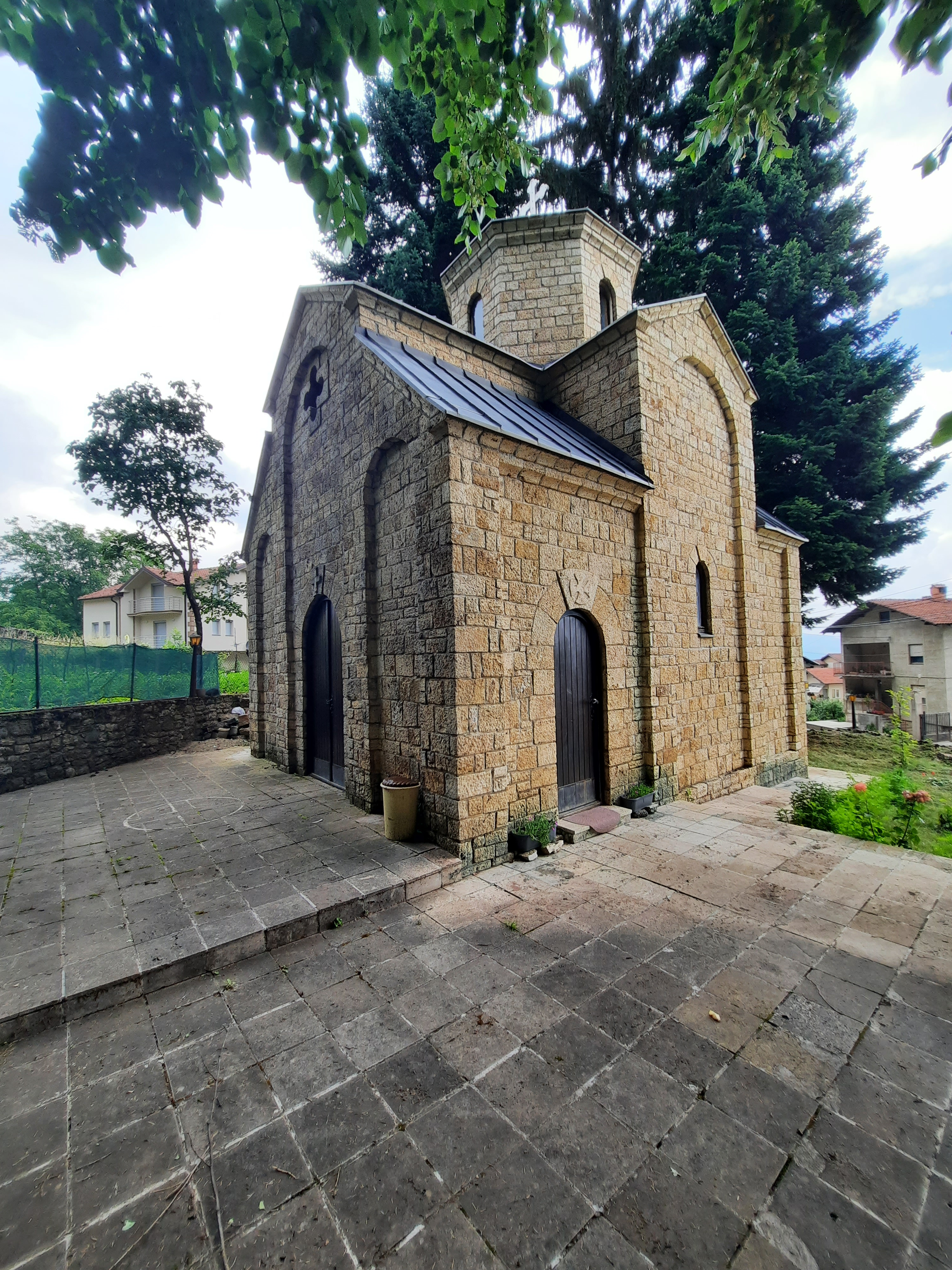
The Church in 2023

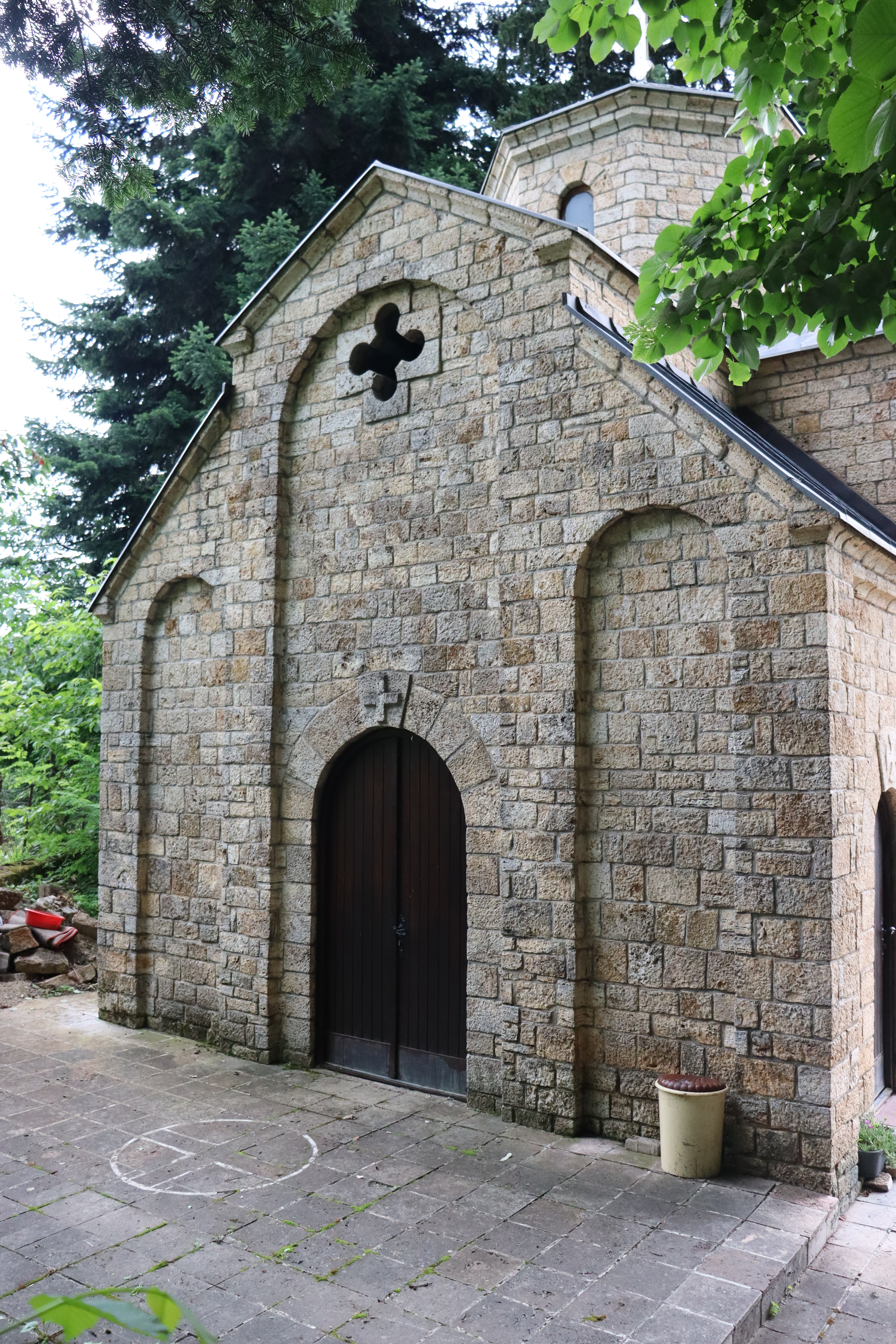
The Church in 2023

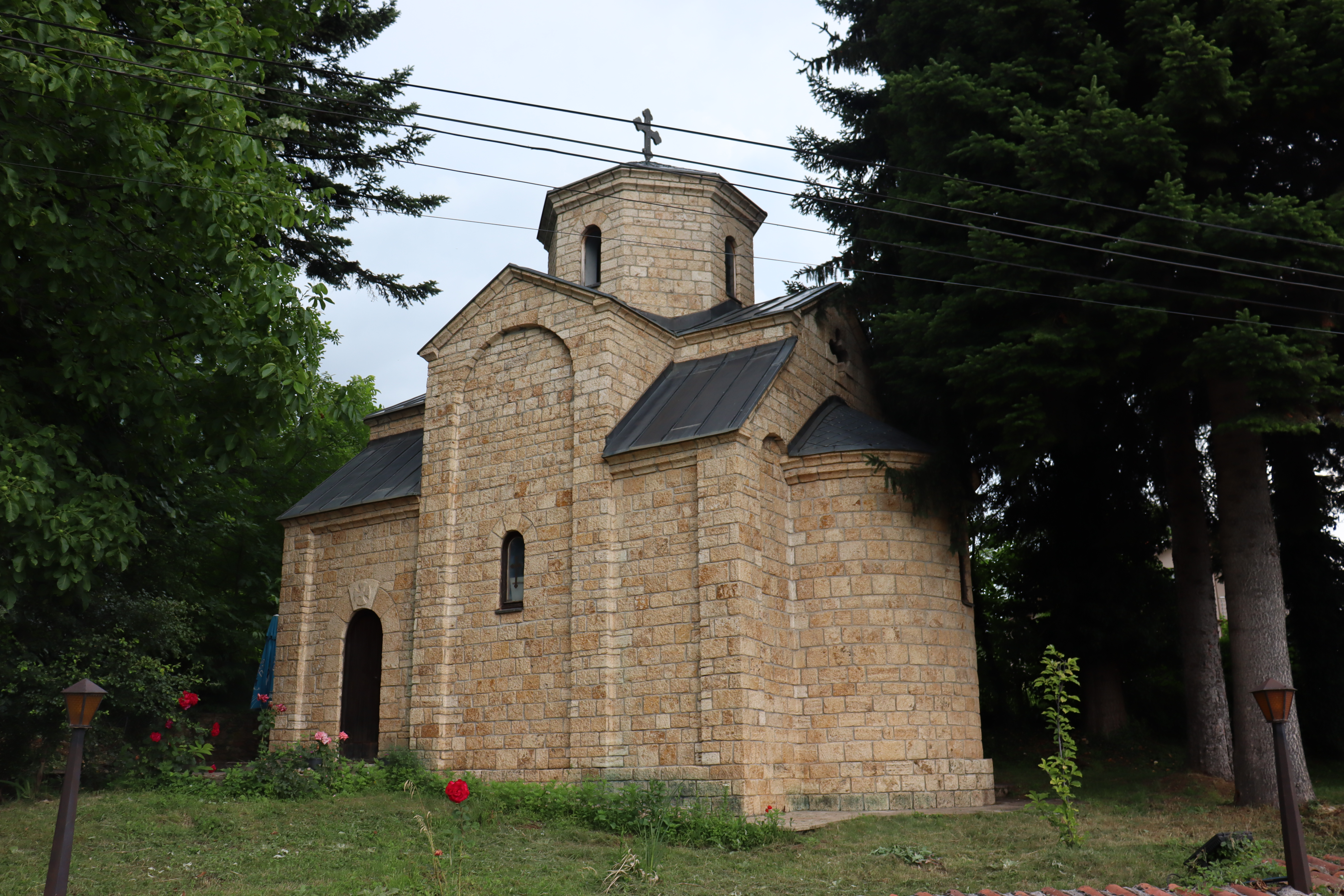
The Church in 2023

== See also ==
- St. Nicholas Church, Vevčani
- St. Barbara the Great Martyr and St. Sava of Jerusalem Church, Vevčani
- Ascension of Christ Upper Church, Vevčani
- Dormition of the Theotokos Church, Vevčani
- St. George the Great Martyr and Victory Bearer Church, Vevčani
- St. Demetrius the Great Martyr Chapel, Vevčani
- St. Paraskevi the Venerable Chapel, Vevčani
- Mid-Pentecost Chapel, Vevčani
- St. Kyriaki Chapel, Vevčani
- Epiphany Chapel, Vevčani
