= List of festivals in North Macedonia =

Festivals in North Macedonia include:

== By type ==
=== Film ===
- Manaki Brothers Film Festival

=== Music ===
- Balkan Music Square Festival, a music festival
- International Children's Music Festival "Asterisks", an international children’s festival
- Ohrid Summer Festival, an annual theater and music festival from July to August
- Skopje Jazz Festival, a jazz festival
- MakFest,
- Ohrid Choir Festival, a choir festival
- Ohrid Fest,
- Skopje Fest,

=== Folklore and traditional ===
- Balkan Folklore Festival, annual folklore music and dance festivalin Ohrid
- Galičnik Wedding Festival, an annual festival held in Galičnik in which a selected couple gets married in the traditional "Galička" style wedding

=== Children's ===
- Si-Do, a children's festival

=== Theater ===
- Struga Poetry Evenings, an internationally acclaimed poetry festival
- Days of Comedy, a theater comedy festival in Kumanovo

=== Sports ===
- Ohrid Swimming Marathon, an international open water swimming competition in Lake Ohrid

== See also ==
- List of music festivals
