= List of people from Ohrid =

Below is a list of notable people born in Ohrid, North Macedonia, or its surroundings:

- Clement of Ohrid, medieval saint and writer
- Judah Leon ben Moses Mosconi, Romaniote Jewish scholar and Talmudist
- Kosta Abrašević, poet
- Valon Ahmedi, footballer
- Arabacı Ali Pasha, Grand Vizier of the Ottoman Empire
- Eyüp Sabri Akgöl, Ottoman revolutionary and Turkish politician
- Atina Bojadži, marathon swimmer
- Kliment Boyadzhiev, general and minister
- Vladimir Četkar, singer
- Živko Čingo, writer
- Mihail Dimonie, botanist and teacher
- Mihail Drumeș, prose writer and playwright
- Andrea Gropa, lord of Ohrid
- Dervish Hima, signatory of the Albanian Declaration of Independence
- Ohrili Hüseyin Pasha, Grand Vizier of the Ottoman Empire
- Mišo Juzmeski, writer and photographer
- Kaliopi, singer-songwriter
- Grigor Koprov, pop music composer
- Pasko Kuzman, archaeologist
- Erik Lloga, community leader of Albanian-Australians
- Sehadete Mekuli, physician
- Aleksandar Mitreski, footballer
- Eva Nedinkovska, singer
- Hamdi Ohri, 19th century Albanian Rilindas
- Zyhdi Ohri, signatory of the Albanian Declaration of Independence
- Cedi Osman, basketball player
- Kiril Parlichev, revolutionary
- Grigor Parlichev, writer and translator
- Metody Patchev, teacher and revolutionary
- Anastasios Pehion, educator and revolutionary
- Cincar Janko Popović, one of the leaders of the First Serbian Uprising
- Aleksandar Protogerov, politician and revolutionary
- Redžep Selman, triple jumper
- Kuzman Shapkarev, folklorist and scientist
- Blerton Sheji, Macedonian footballer
- Zagorka Shuke, film, stage and theatre actress
- Gjoko Taneski, singer and Eurovision entrant in 2010
- Hristo Uzunov, revolutionary
