= Institute for Protection of Cultural Monuments and National Museum =

Scientific, research and cultural institution in Ohrid, North Macedonia

- Завод за заштита на спомениците на културата и Народен музеј
- Former name: National Museum in Ohrid
- Established: 1 May 1951
- Location: Ohrid, North Macedonia
- Coordinates: 41.1131686°N 20.7935576°E
- Type: National history museum
- Founder: Dimche Malenko
- Website: muzejohrid.mk

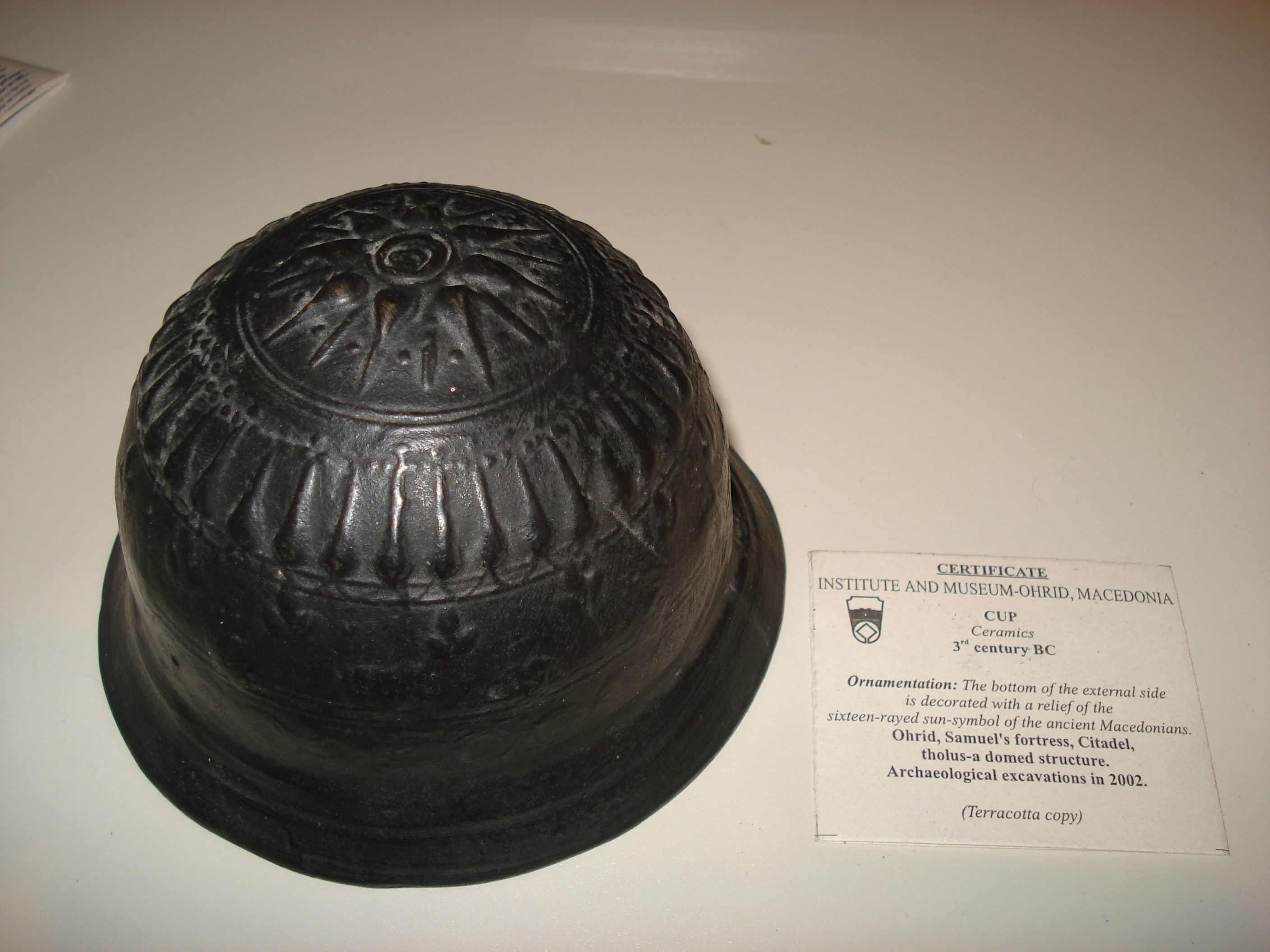
Ceramic cup with the Ancient Macedonian sun symbol with 16 rays dated 3rd century BC, discovered by the Institute in Ohrid in 2002, incl. a certificate from the Institute for Protection of Cultural Monuments and the National Museum, Ohrid.

Golden application with the Ancient Macedonian sun with 8 rays from Ohrid, 5th century BC incl. a certificate from the Institute for Protection of Cultural Monuments and the National Museum, Ohrid.

Institute for Protection of Cultural Monuments and the National Museum (Macedonian: Завод за заштита на спомениците на културата и Народен музеј) is a scientific, research and cultural institution in Ohrid, North Macedonia.

The framework of this institution incorporates several departments: archaeology, history, ethnology, architecture, history of art, and contemporary art. It also has its own library, and a photo-preparatory laboratory. The essential part of its activities is the depot which give a shelter to approximately 800 icons dating from the period between 12th and 19th century. The most representative ones were relocated in the Ohrid Gallery of Icons. The institute's current activities involve reconstruction and restoration of Tsar Samuil's Fortress, The Ancient Theatre and St. Clement's monastery of Saint Panteleimon at Plaošnik and earlier complete reconstruction of the Robevs House. Today the house contains an archaeological display, exhibition of articles from the Robevs household, artwork of the Ohrid Woodcarving School and archeological excavations of Ohrid and its vicinity.

An alabaster statue of Isis from the 3rd century BC, now in the Robev House, is depicted on the obverse of the Macedonian 10 denars banknote, issued in 1996.
