= Robevi family house =

Coordinates: 41°06′44.33″N 20°47′46.5″E

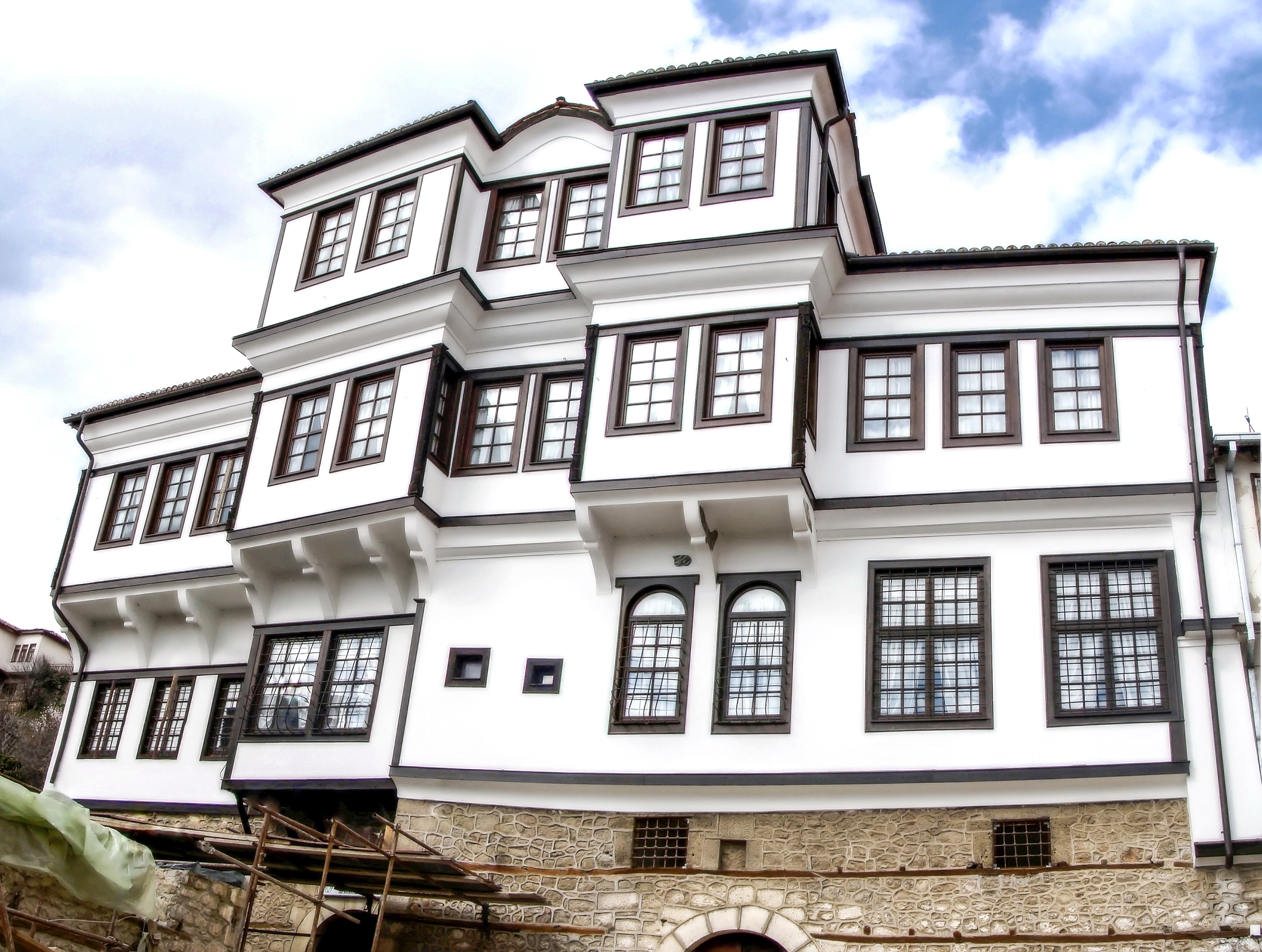
- Interactive map of the Robevi family house area

General information
- Type: House
- Location: Ohrid, North Macedonia
- Construction started: 1827

The Robevi House is a famous and historic building in Ohrid, North Macedonia. It was built in its current state in 1863–1864 by Todor Petkov from a village Gari near Debar. Today the house is a protected cultural monument and belongs to the Institute for Protection of Cultural Monuments and National Museum.

== History ==
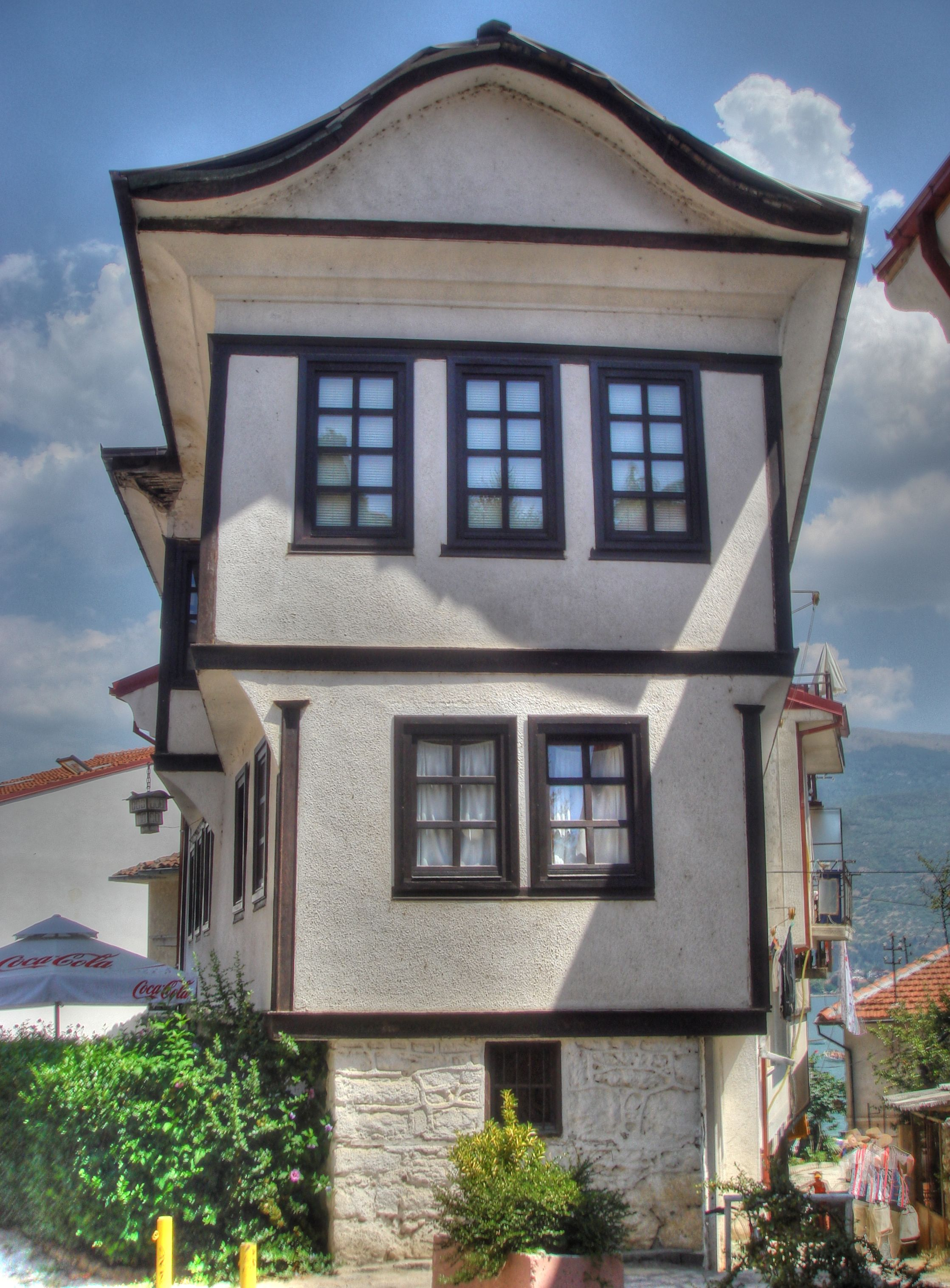
The House of the Kanevce family, another example of Ohrid traditional architecture

The construction of Robevi's original house was completed on April 15, 1827, and this is indicated by an inscription in Greek on a marble slab embedded in the store in the yard. It is a traditional Ottoman Turkish house architecture. This famous Ohrid merchant family lived in the house for 35 years when between 1861 and 1862 a famous criminal from Ohrid Ustref Beg burnt it to the ground.

Two years later, between 1863 and 1864, the house was rebuilt. It was divided in two parts: left and right. Konstantin Robev lived in the left part of the house and his brother Atanas Robev in the right part. The main builder was Todor Petkov who built the house from scratch. The family lived in the newly built house until 1900 when they moved to Bitola and used the house as a summer residence.

From 1913 till 1919 in the time of the Balkan Wars and the First World War, the house hosted Serbian soldiers. Some damages were found in the house after they left, part of the carvings were taken to Niš in Serbia. The house has been protected as a cultural-historic museum of North Macedonia since the Second World War ended. The last reconstruction of this marvelous building was made in the 1990s. Currently it serves as exposition space for the archaeological treasures of modern Macedonia on the first floor, the second is a memorial floor dedicated to the Robevi family and the third or the upper floor functions as a residence.

== The Archeological Museum of Ohrid ==
The house is a protected cultural monument consisting of three floors. Epigraphical monuments from Ohrid are placed on the ground part of the house including precious objects as the Milokas (found on the Via Egnatia) road, the two torsos of the goddess Isis etc. The archaeological objects from ancient times and the medieval period are exhibited on the second and third floors.

The upper part of the house serves as exhibition space for objects made by the Ohrid carving school, creations of famous artists from Ohrid and the county. In the eastern part of the house some objects from the Robevi family are exhibited.

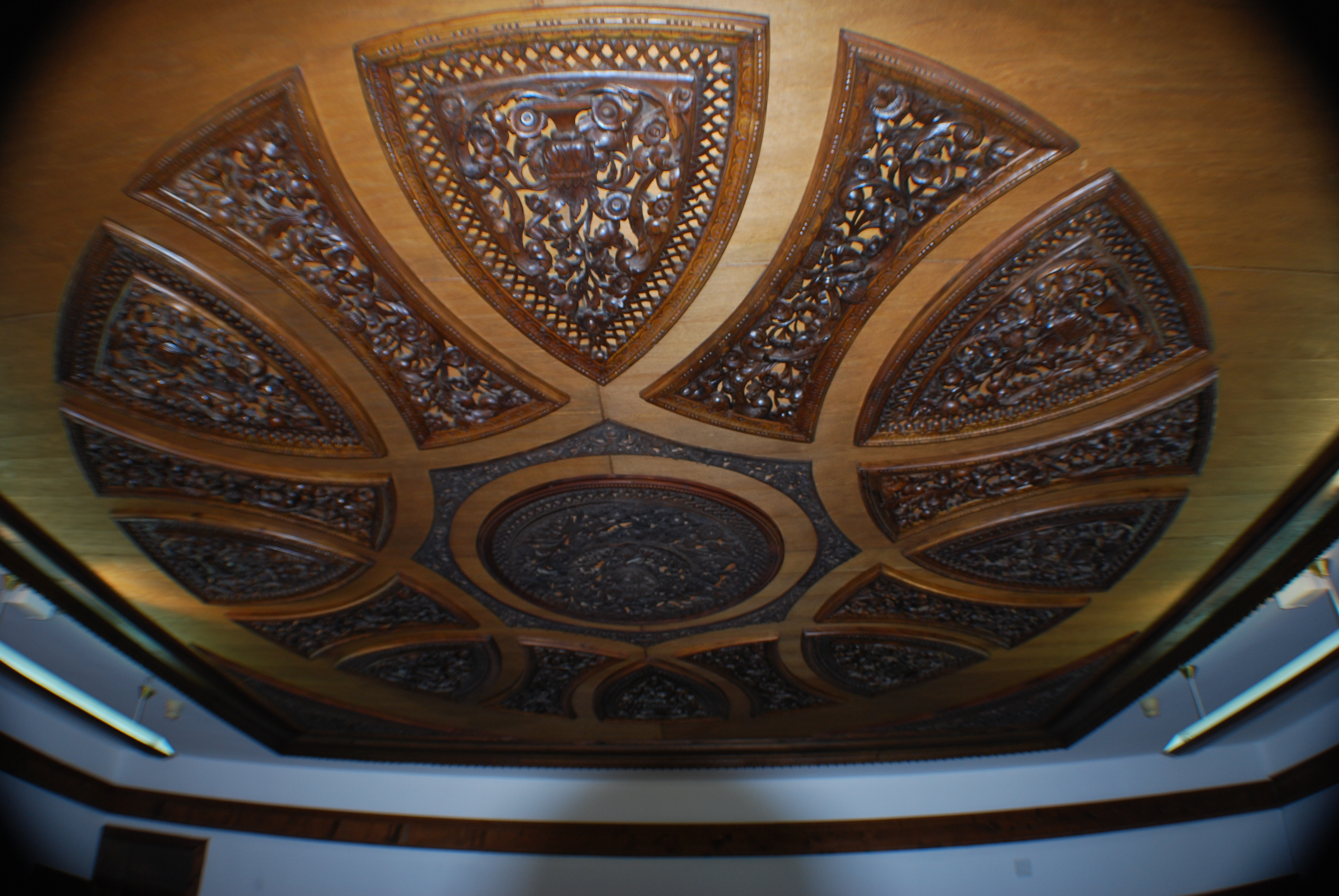
The ceiling on the third floor

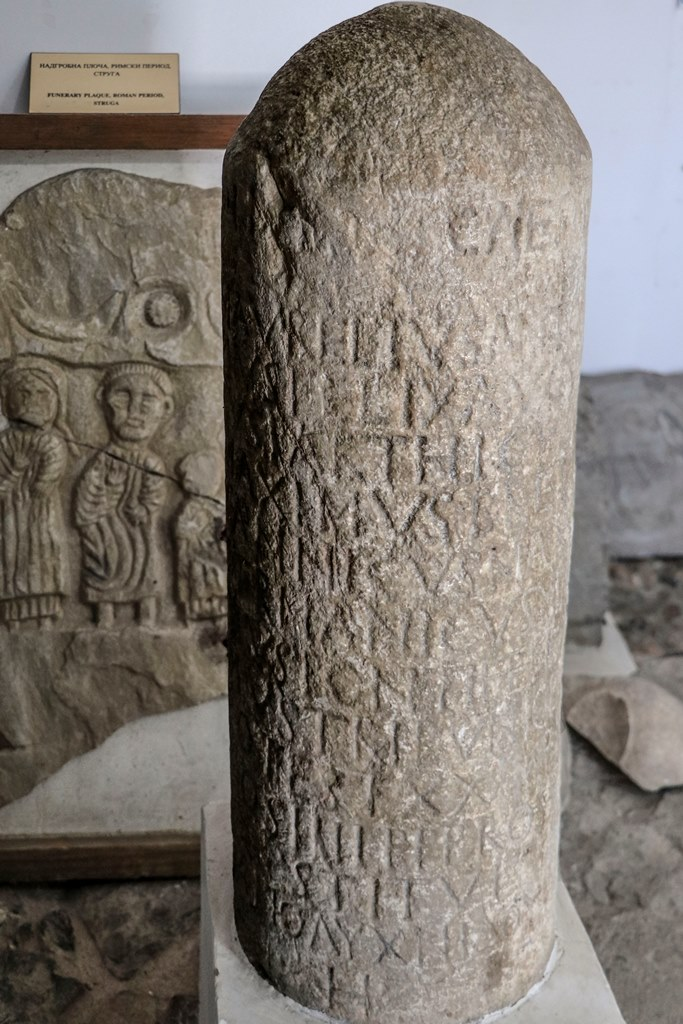
Mile stone of via Egnatia

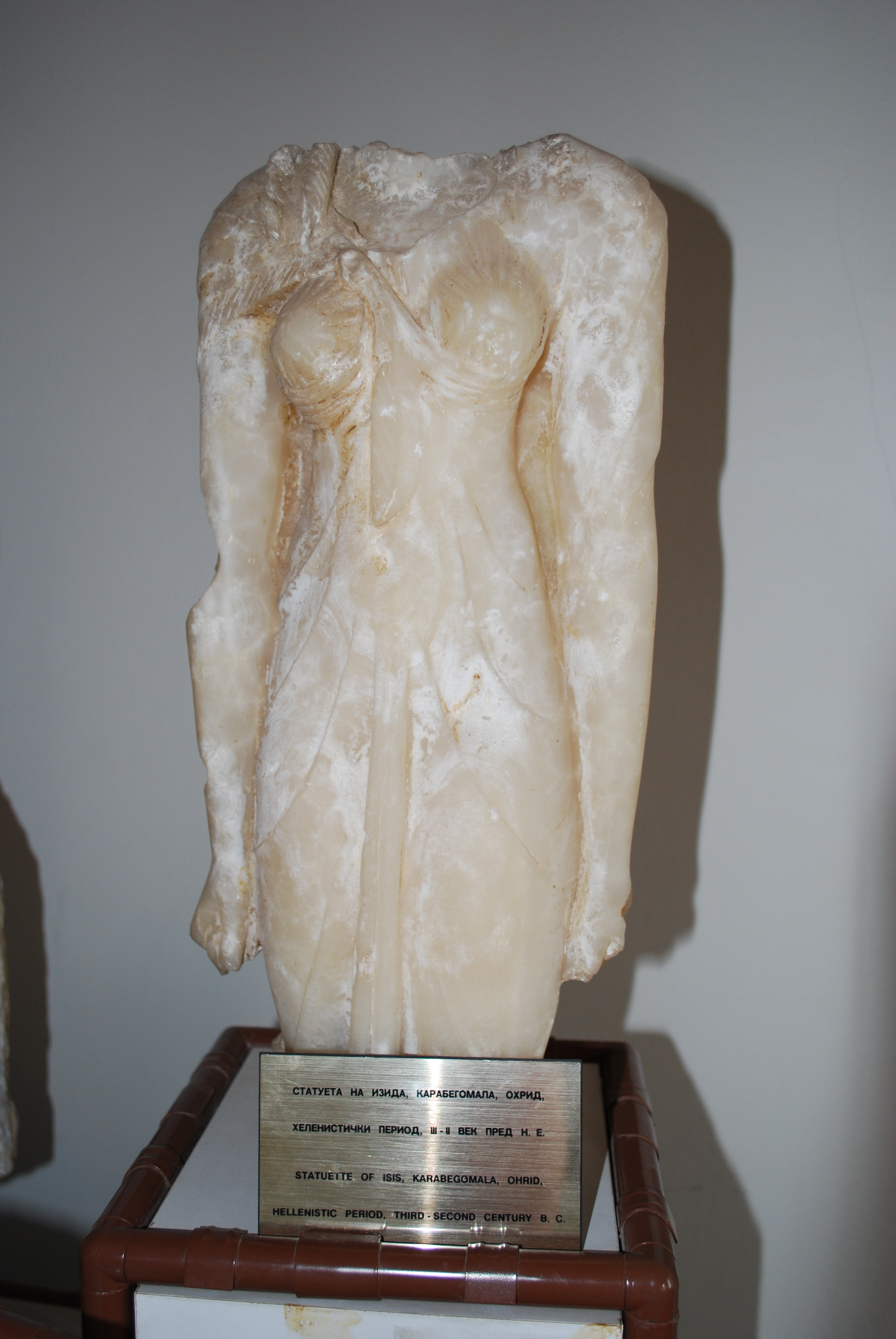
Torso of the Egyptian goddess Isis

== Trivia ==
The "torso of the goddess Isis" exhibited in the Robevi house is printed on the 10 denar bank note. The torso of Isis can be dated to the 2nd century BC.
