= Balkan Folklore Festival =

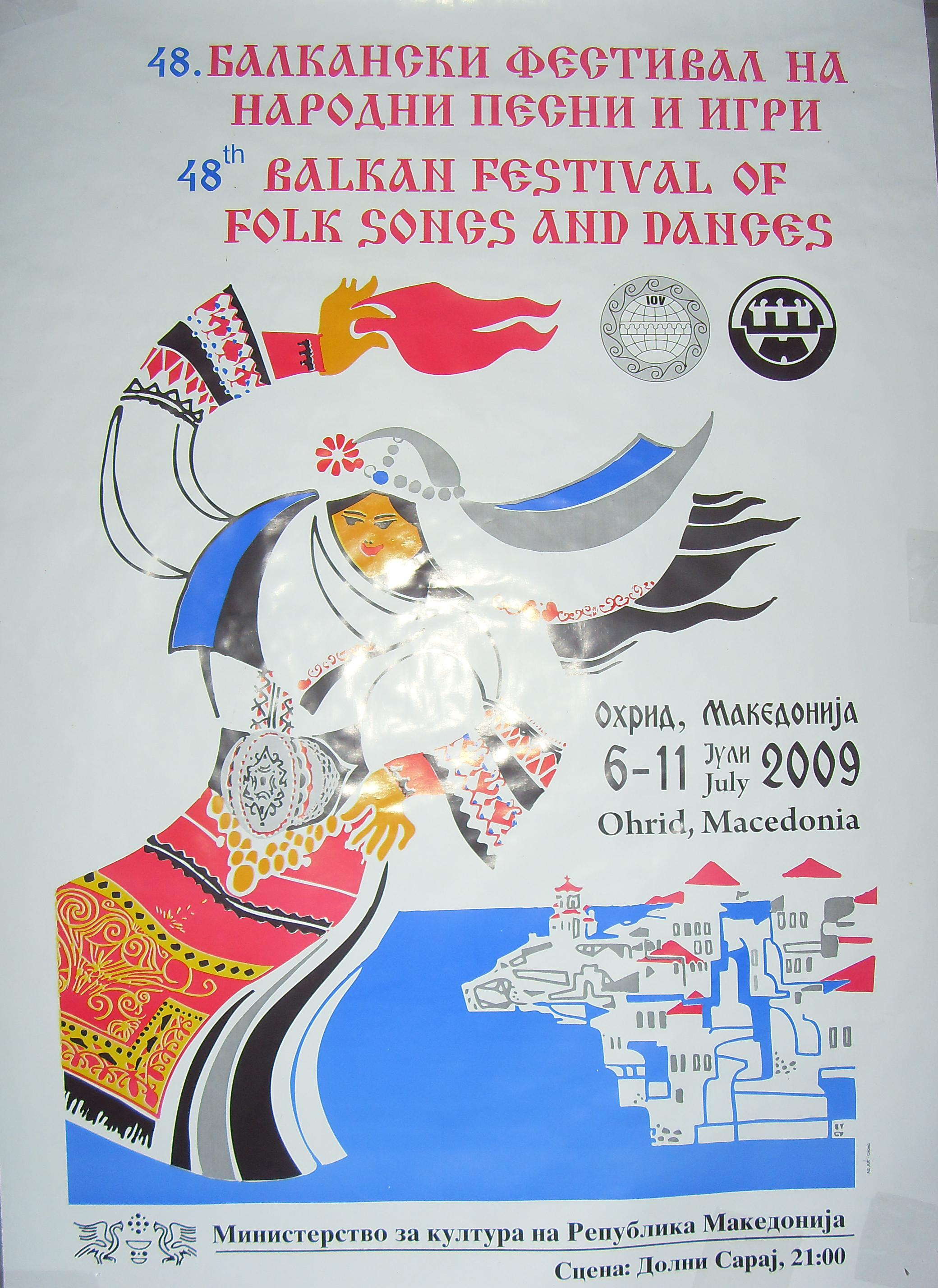
Festival logo from 2009

Balkan Folklore Festival (Macedonian: Балкански Фолклорен Фестивал) or Balkan festival of folk songs and dances is an international folk festival in Ohrid, North Macedonia. It was founded in 1962 and represents the oldest manifestation of its kind in the Balkans. At that festival many vocal and instrumental artistic groups and solosingers present the authentic tradition and culture throughout the dances, songs, customs, traditional clothes and instruments. Traditionally, the festival is held at the beginning of July.

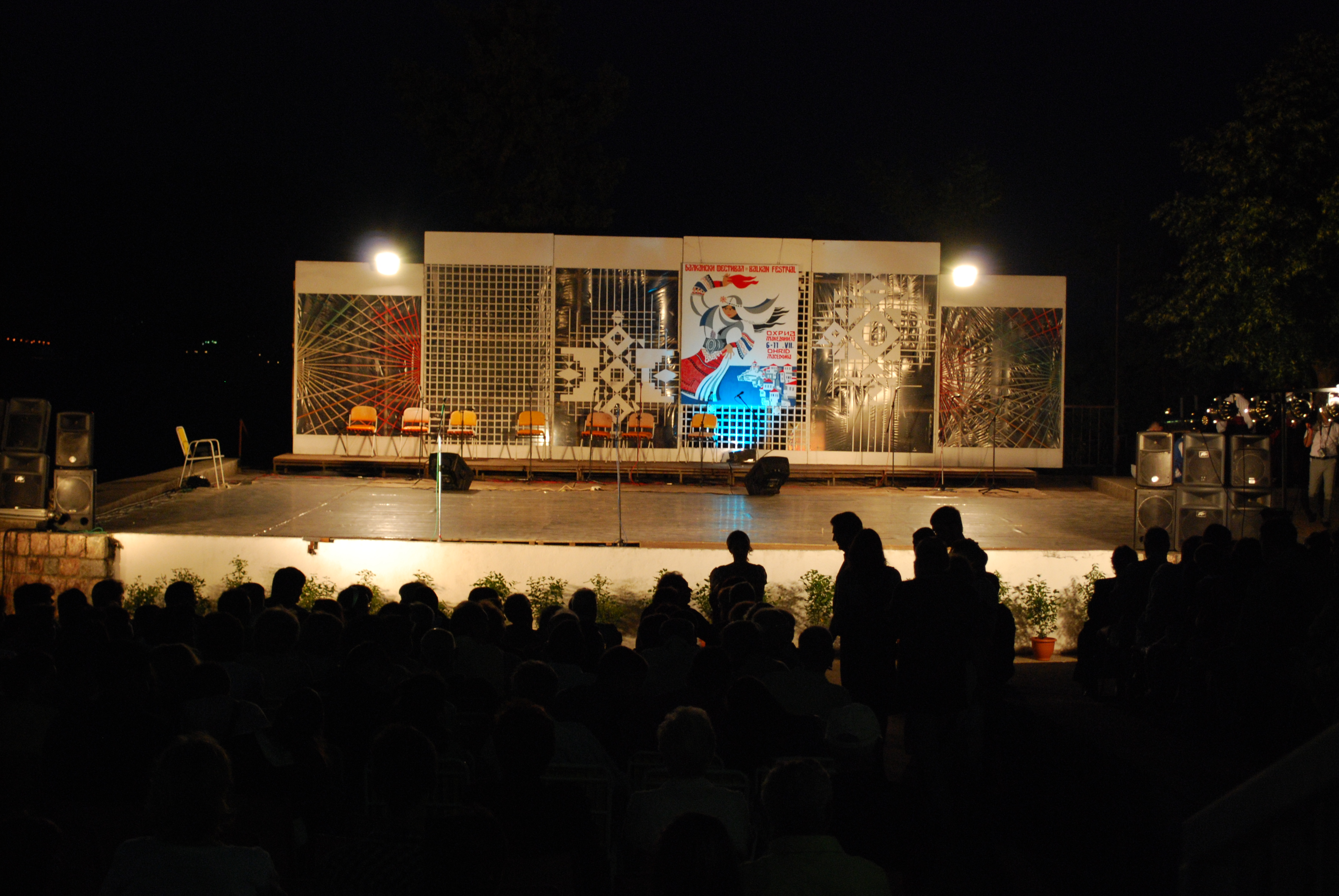
The Stage

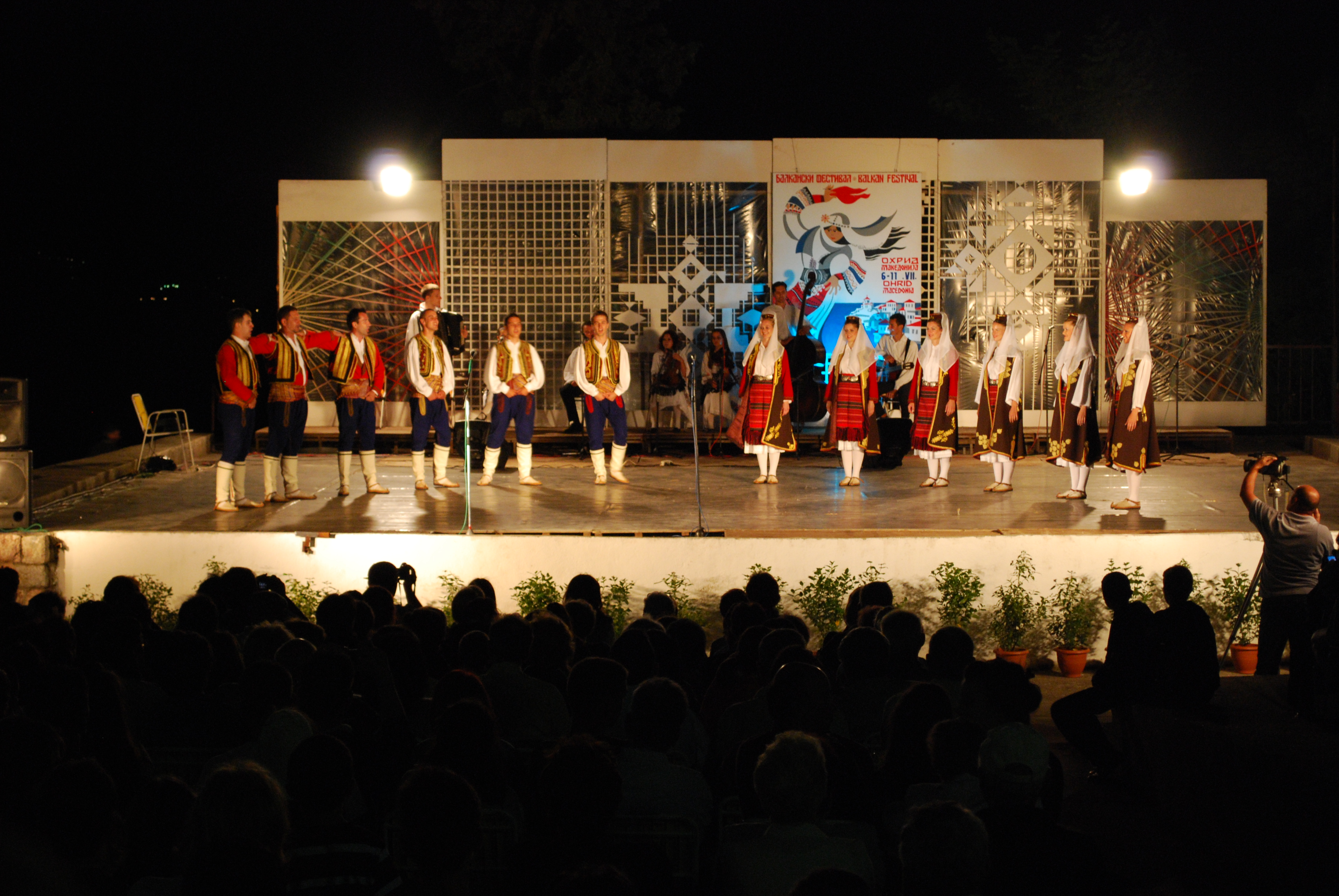
Group

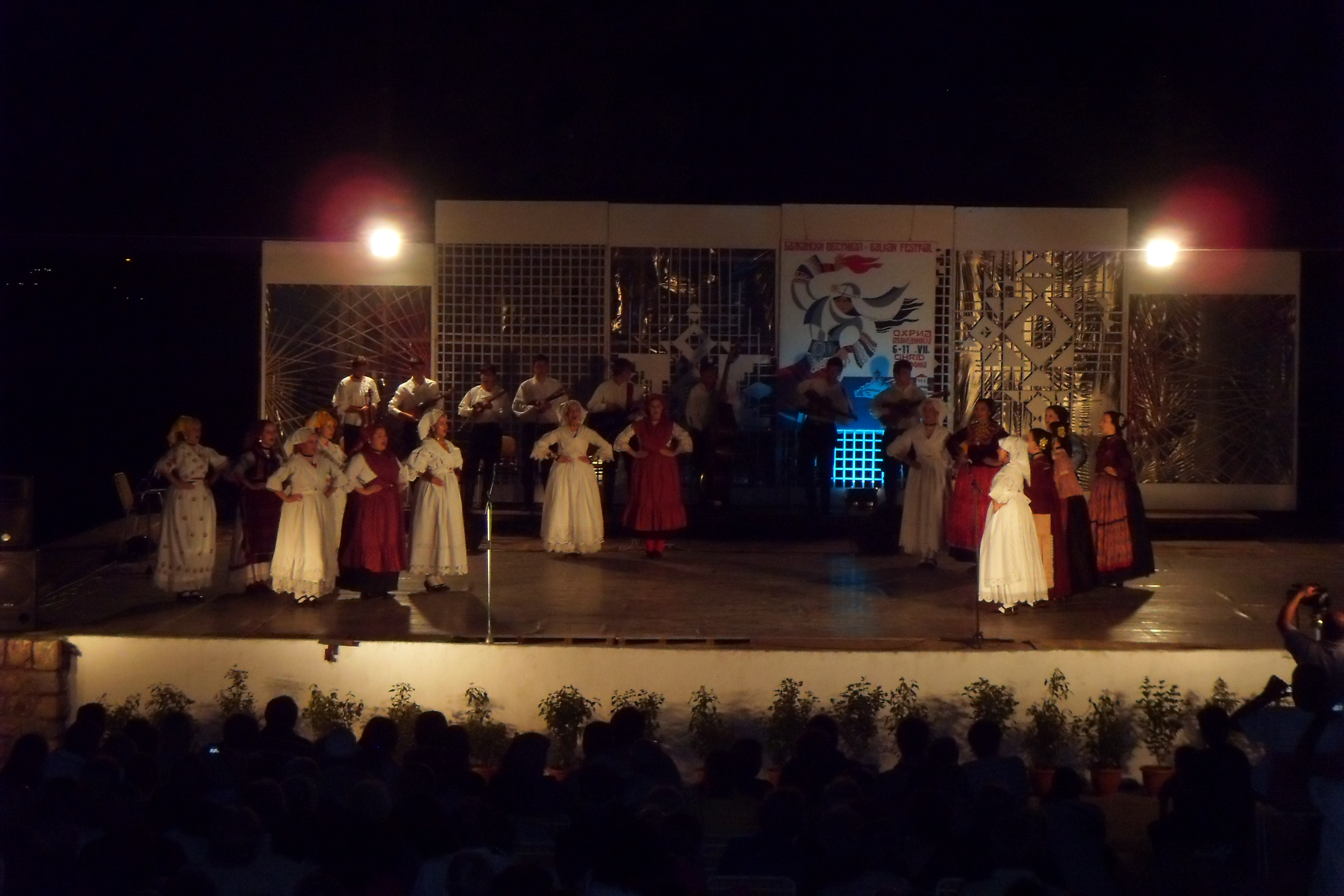
Group from Croatia
