= Ohrid =

City in southwestern North Macedonia

Ohrid Охрид (Macedonian)
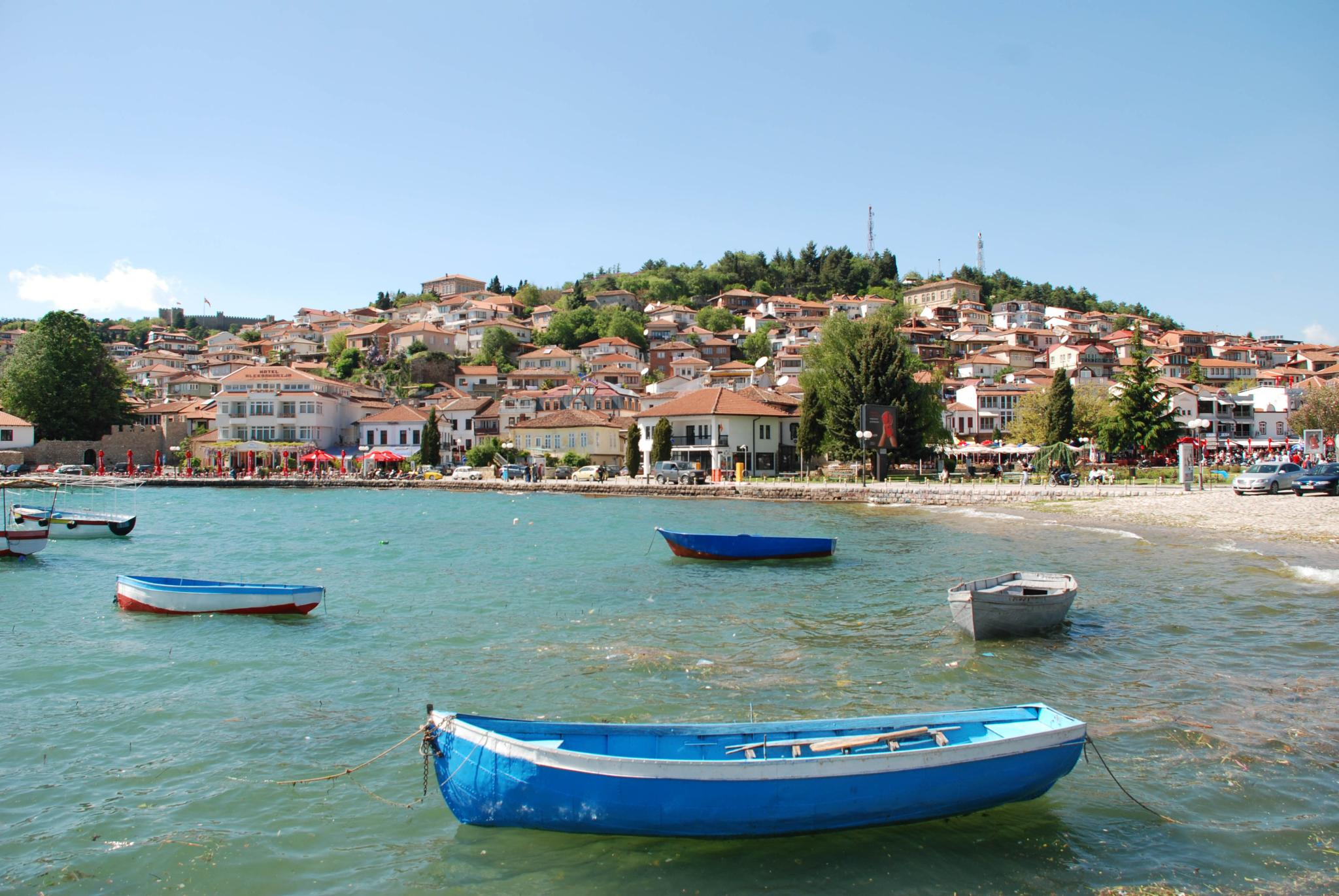
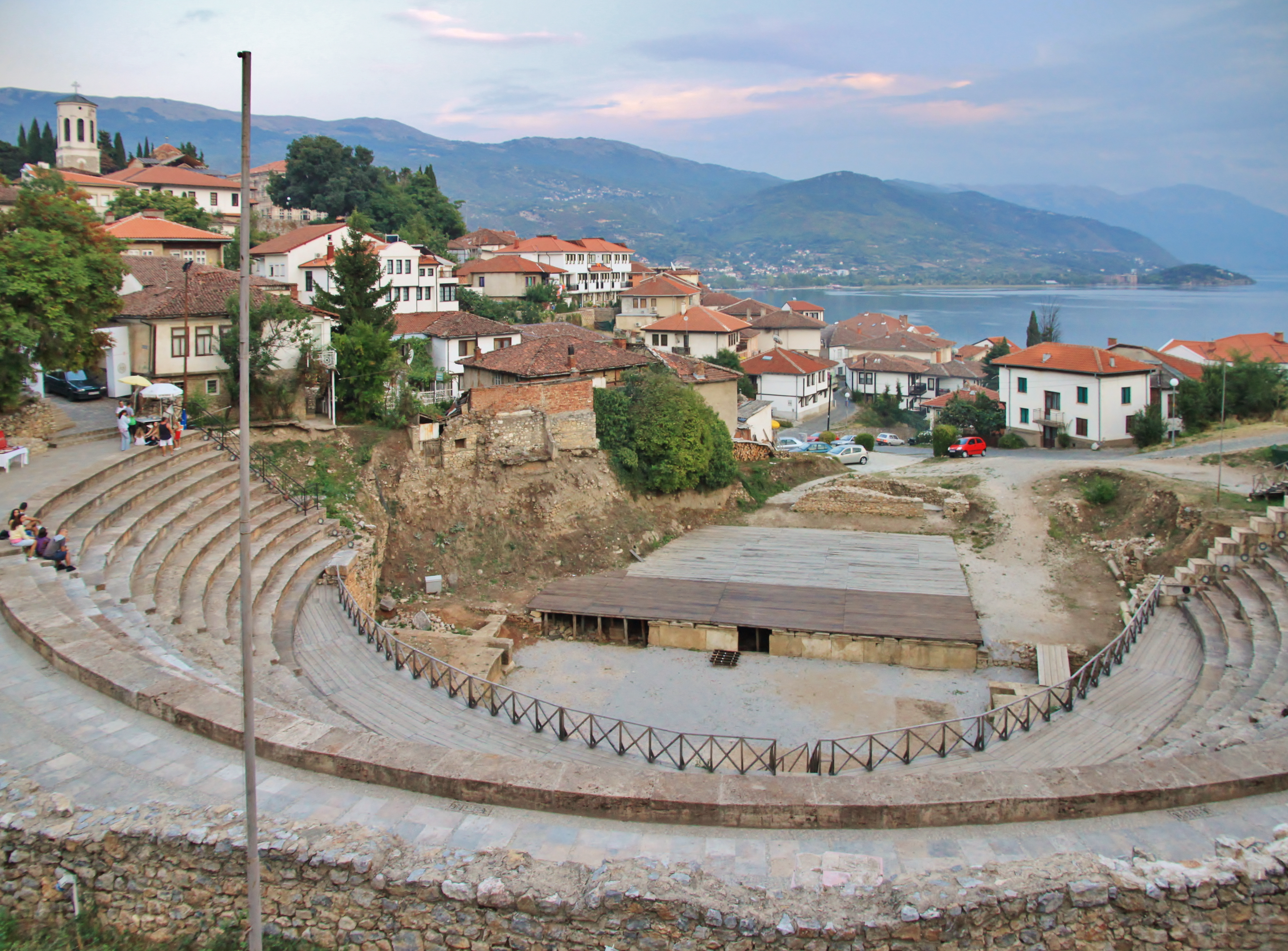
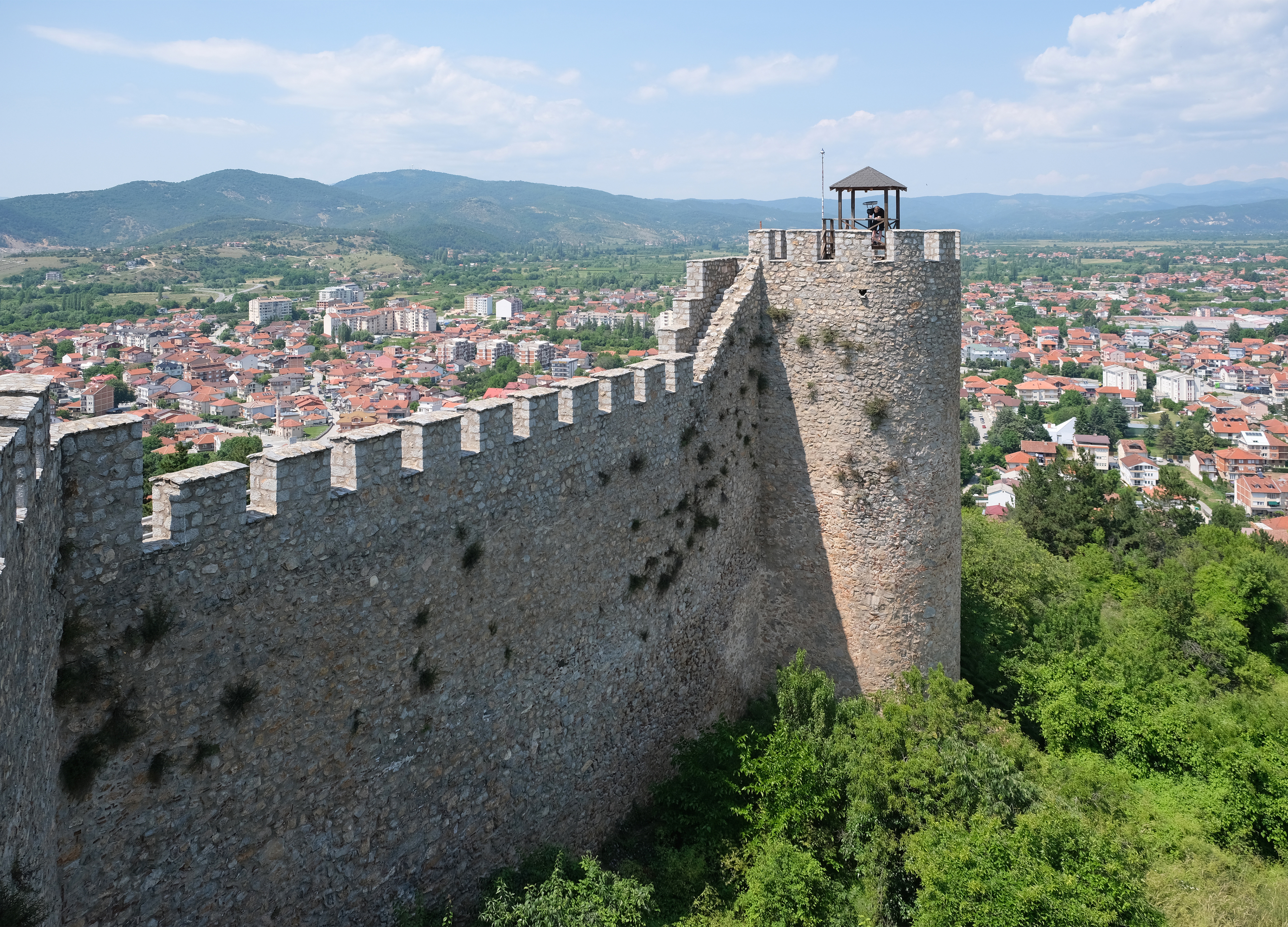
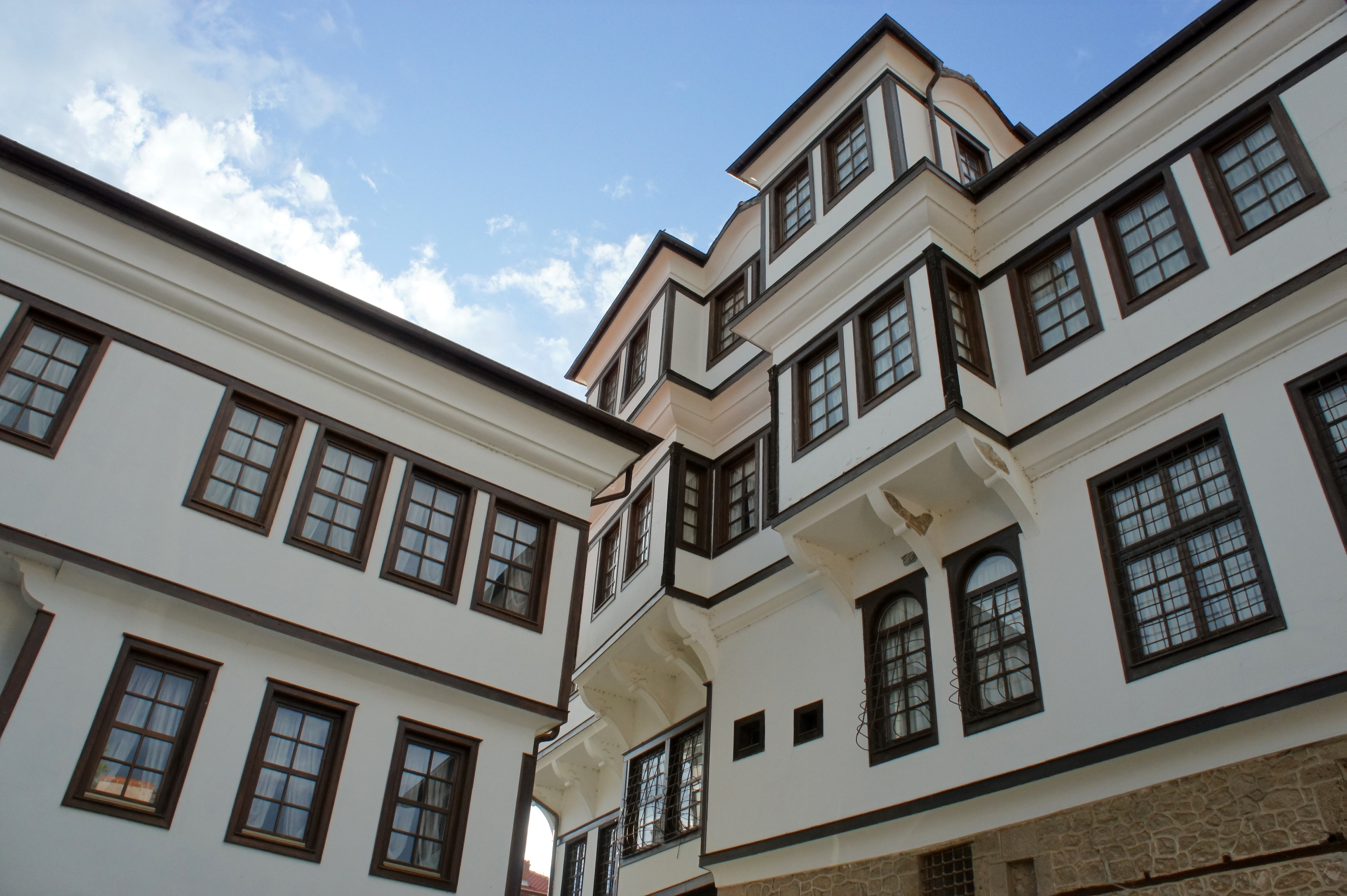
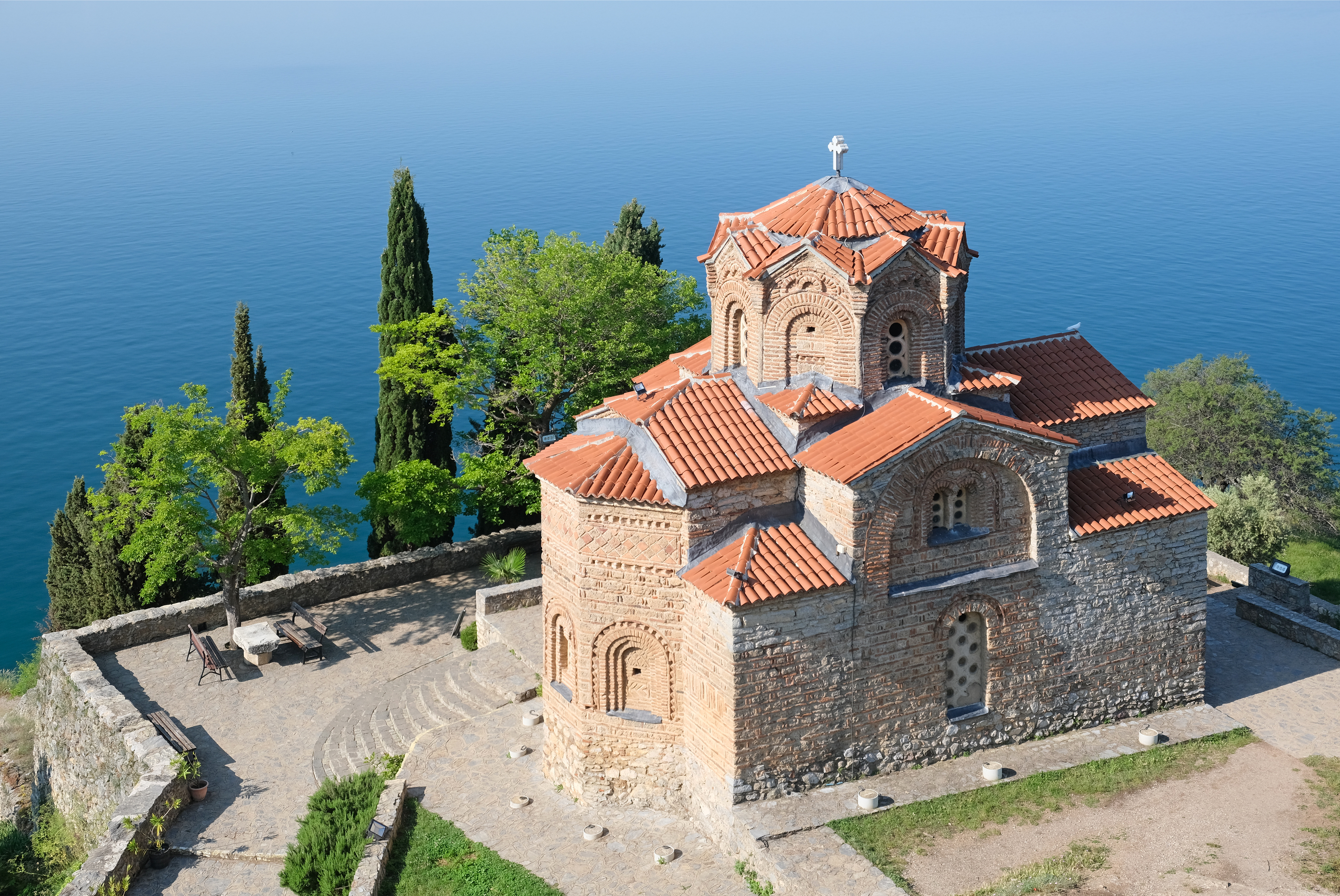
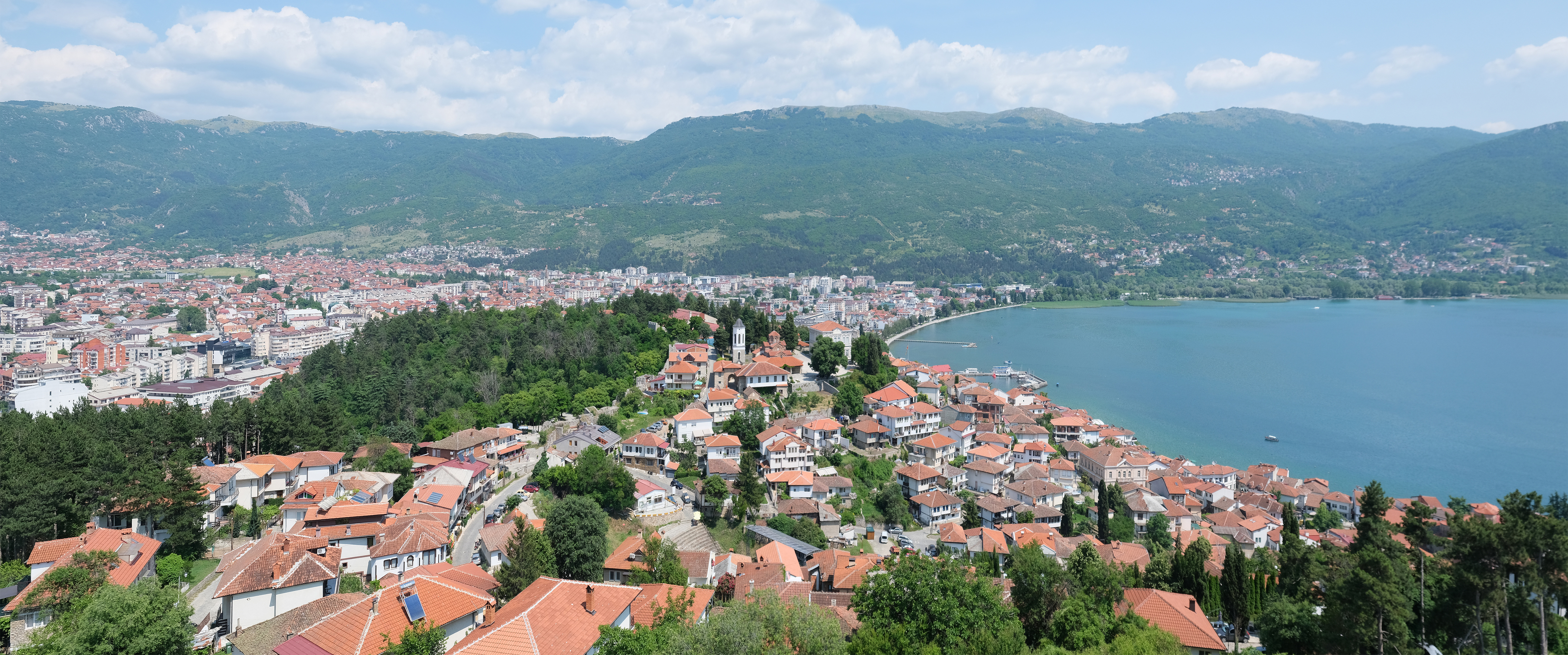
- Ohrid and Lake Ohrid

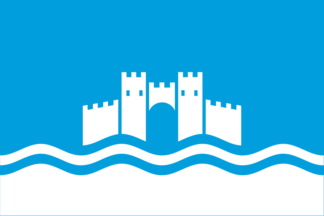
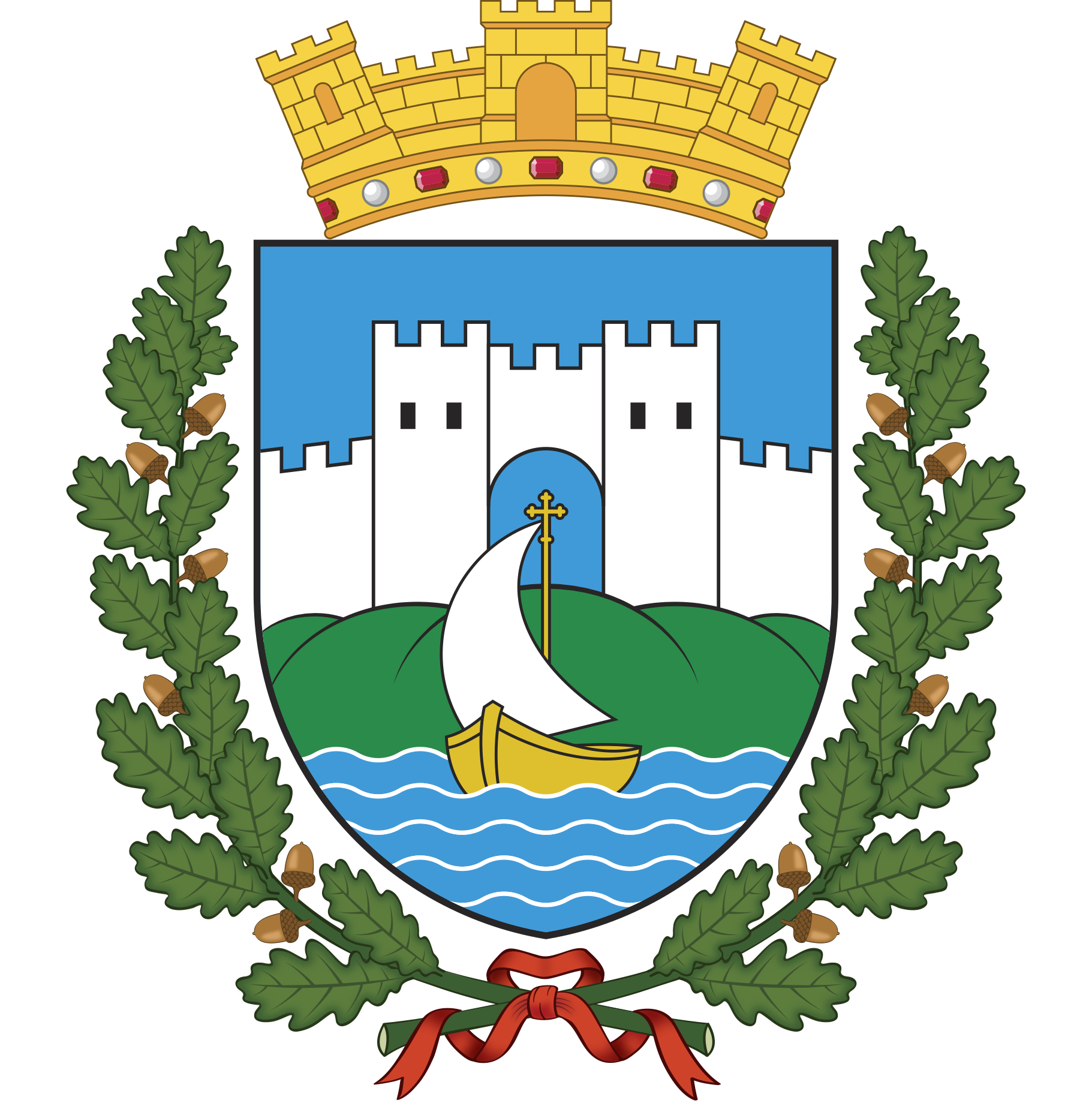
- Flag Coat of arms
- Nicknames: Balkan Jerusalem; Macedonian Jerusalem; European Jerusalem
- Location within North Macedonia
- Coordinates: 41°07′01″N 20°48′06″E
- Country: North Macedonia
- Region: Southwestern
- Municipality: Ohrid

Government
  - Mayor: Kiril Pecakov (VMRO-DPMNE)

Area
  - Total: 383.93 km^{2} (148.24 sq mi)
- Elevation: 695 m (2,280 ft)

Population (2021)
  - Total: 38,818
  - Density: 101.11/km^{2} (261.87/sq mi)
- Time zone: UTC+1 (CET)
- Postal codes: 6000
- Area code: +389 046
- Vehicle registration: OH
- Climate: Cfb
- Patron saints: Saint Clement and Saint Naum
- Website: https://ohrid.gov.mk

UNESCO World Heritage Site
- Official name: Natural and Cultural Heritage of the Ohrid region
- Type: Natural, Cultural
- Criteria: i, iii, iv, vii
- Designated: 1979 (3rd session)
- Reference no.: 99
- Region: Europe and North America
- Extensions: 1980, 2019

Ohrid (Macedonian: Охрид [ˈɔxrit]) is a city in North Macedonia and is the seat of the Ohrid Municipality. It is the largest city on Lake Ohrid and the eighth-largest city in the country, with it recording a population of over 38,000 inhabitants as of 2021. Ohrid is known for once having 365 churches, one for each day of the year, and has been referred to as the "Jerusalem of the Balkans". The city is rich in picturesque houses and monuments, and tourism is predominant. It is located southwest of Skopje, west of Resen and Bitola. In 1979 and in 1980, respectively, Ohrid and Lake Ohrid were accepted as Cultural and Natural World Heritage Sites by UNESCO. Ohrid is one of only 40 sites that are part of UNESCO's World Heritage that are Cultural as well as Natural sites.

== Name ==
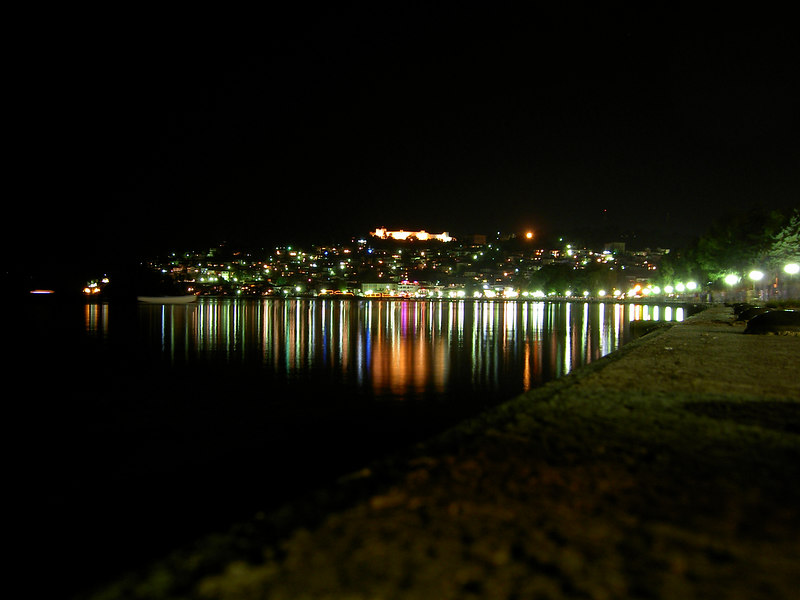
Ohrid by night. The ancient name of the city was Lychnidos, which probably means "city of light".

In antiquity the city was known under the ancient Greek name of Λυχνίς (Lychnis), Λυχνιδός or Λύχνιδος (Lychnidos) and the Latin Lychnidus, probably meaning "city of light", literally "a precious stone that emits light", from λύχνος (lychnos), "lamp, portable light". Polybius, writing in the second century BC, refers to the town as Λυχνίδιον - Lychnidion.

The evolution of the ancient toponym Lychnidus into Oh(ë)r(id) required a long-standing period of Tosk Albanian–Eastern South Slavic bilingualism, or at least contact, resulting from the Tosk Albanian rhotacism -n- into -r- and Eastern South Slavic l-vocalization ly- into o-.

It became capital of the First Bulgarian Empire in the early medieval period, and was often referred to by Byzantine writers as Achrida (Ἄχριδα, Ὄχριδα, or Ἄχρις). By 879 AD, the town was no longer called Lychnidos but was referred to as Ohrid.

In Macedonian and the other South Slavic languages, the name of the city is Ohrid (Охрид). In Albanian, the city is known as Ohër or Ohri and in modern Greek Ochrida (Οχρίδα, Ωχρίδα) and Achrida (Αχρίδα). The name of the city in Aromanian is Ohãrda.

== History ==
Historical affiliations

Illyrians (Enchele Dassaretii) 8th century BC–5th century BC
Illyrian kingdom 5th century BC–358 BC
Kingdom of Macedonia 358 BC–300 BC
Illyrians(Dassaretii) 3rd century BC–250 BC
Illyrian kingdom 250 BC–228 BC
Kingdom of Macedonia 228 BC–208 BC
Kingdom of Dardania 208 BC–170 BC
Kingdom of Macedonia 170 BC–148 BC
Roman Republic 148 BC–27 BC
Roman Empire 27 BC–395
Byzantine Empire 395–842
First Bulgarian Empire 842–1018
Byzantine Empire 1018–1083
Bohemond I of Antioch 1083–1085
Byzantine Empire 1085–1203
Second Bulgarian Empire 1203–1208
Strez 1208–1214
Epirus and Thessalonica 1214–1230
Second Bulgarian Empire 1230–1263
Byzantine Empire ~1250–1334
Serbian Kingdom 1334 – ~1336
Gropa family ~1336 – ???
Lordship of Prilep ??? – ~1373
Gropa family ~1373–1395
Ottoman Empire 1395–1464
League of Lezhë 1464–1466
Ottoman Empire 1466–1912
Kingdom of Serbia 1912–1915
Kingdom of Bulgaria 1915–1918
Kingdom of Yugoslavia 1918–1941
Kingdom of Bulgaria 1941–1944
SFR Yugoslavia 1944–1991
Macedonia/North Macedonia 1991–present

=== Antiquity ===
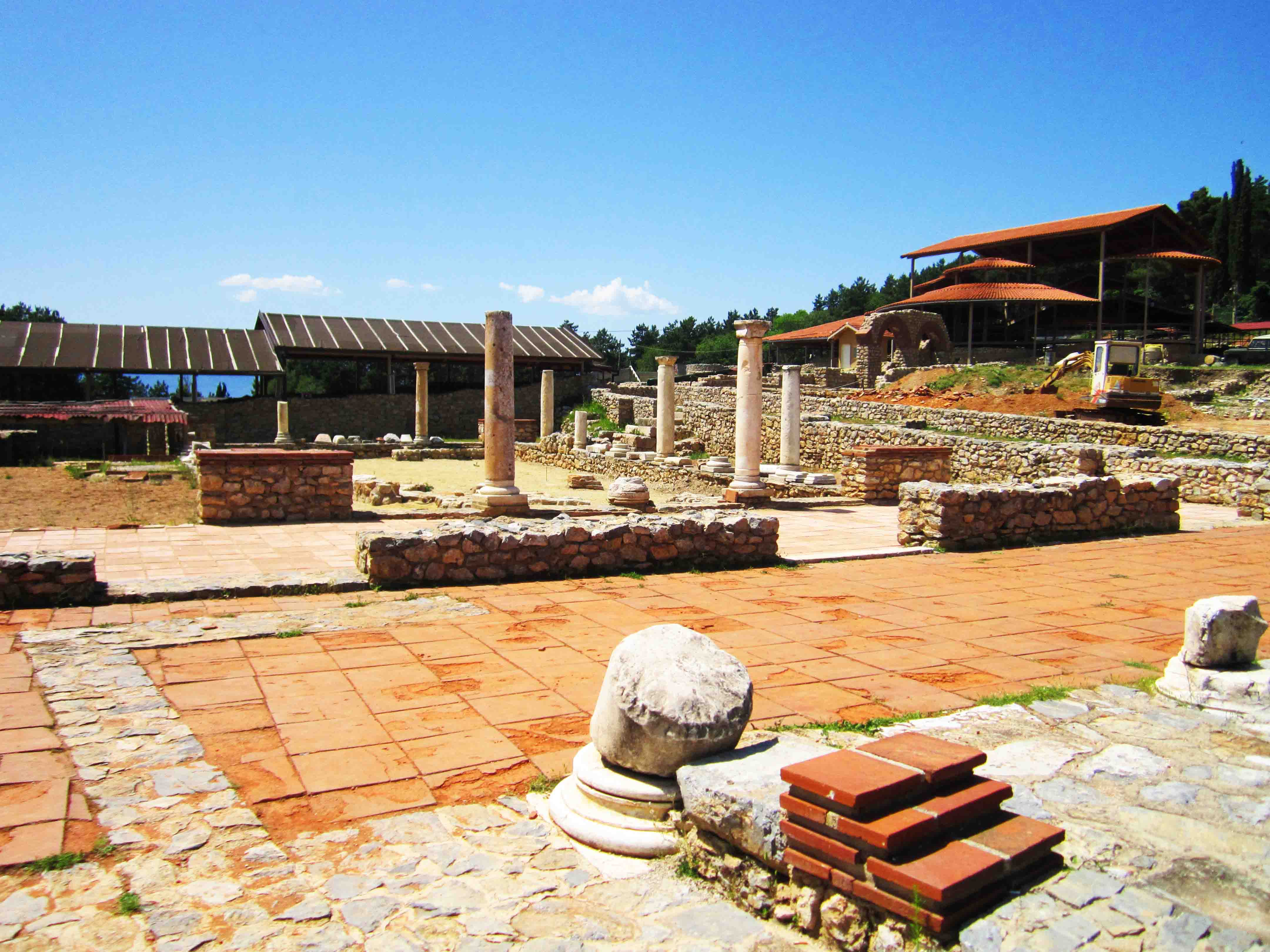
Ruins of the ancient site of Lychnidos

The earliest inhabitants of the wider Lake Ohrid region were the Illyrian tribes of Enchele and Dassaretii. According to a tradition the town was founded by Cadmus, the Phoenician king of Thebes, who fled to Enchele after being banished from Boeotia. In addition to Ohrid, called Lychnidos (Ancient Greek: Λυχνιδός) in classical antiquity, he is said to have founded Budva in Montenegro. Lychnidos was the capital city of the Illyrian Dassaretii.

According to recent excavations, this was a town as early as of the era of king Philip II of Macedon. They conclude that Samuil's Fortress was built on the site of an earlier fortification, dated to the 4th century BC. In 210 BCE, Philip V of Macedon raided a number of southern Illyrian communities. He maintained a garrison at Lychnidos but lost control of the settlement in 208 BCE, when its commander joined local leader Aeropus and invited the Dardani in the region.

During the Roman conquests, towards the end of 3rd and the beginning of 2nd century BC, Lychnidus is mentioned as a town near or within Dassaretia. In Roman times, it was located along the Via Egnatia, which connected the Adriatic port Dyrrachion (present-day Durrës) with Byzantium. Archaeological excavations (e.g., the Polyconch Basilica from the 5th century) prove an early adoption of Christianity in the area. Bishops from Lychnidos participated in multiple ecumenical councils.

=== Middle Ages ===
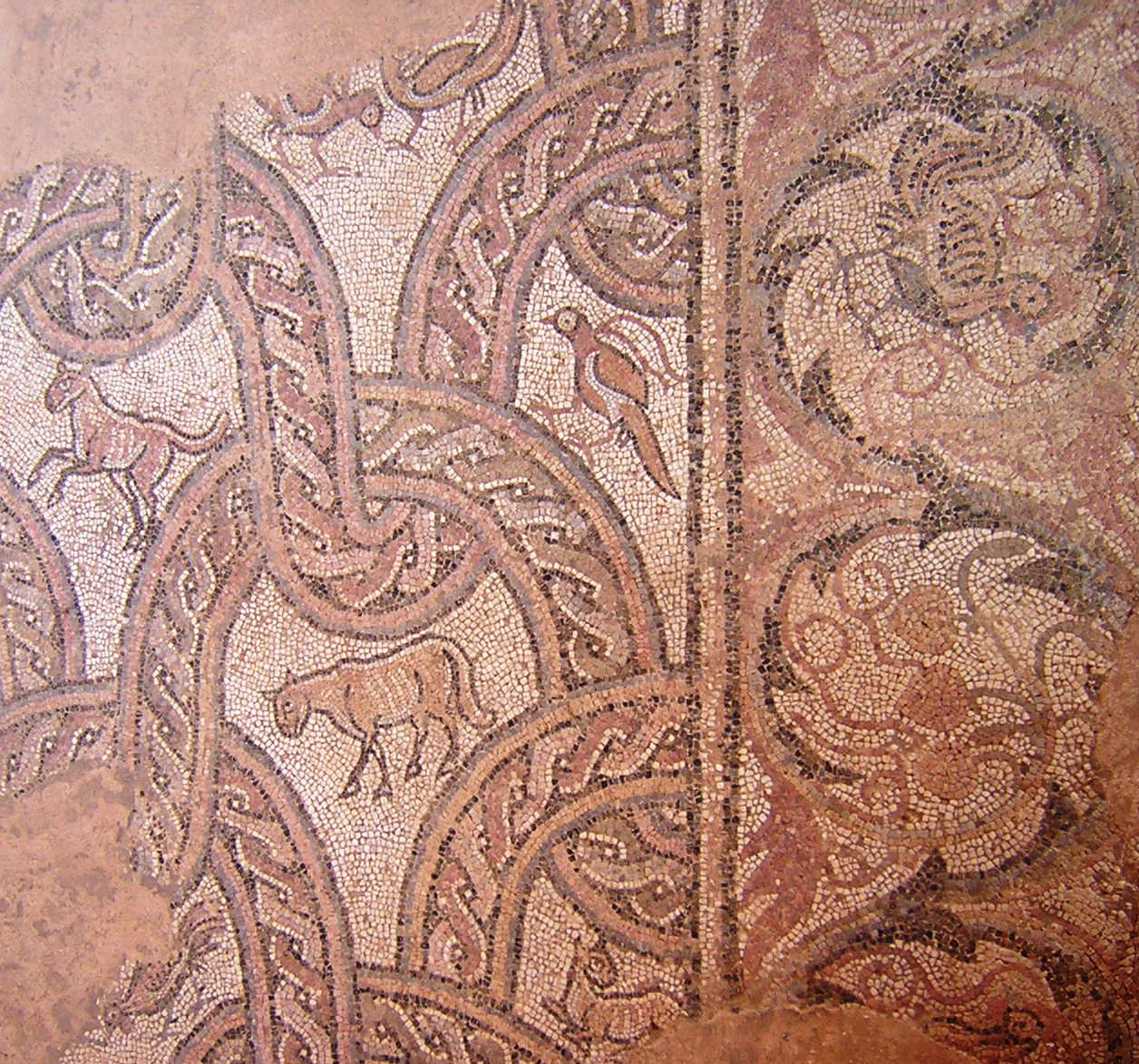
Floor mosaic in the Polyconch Basilica

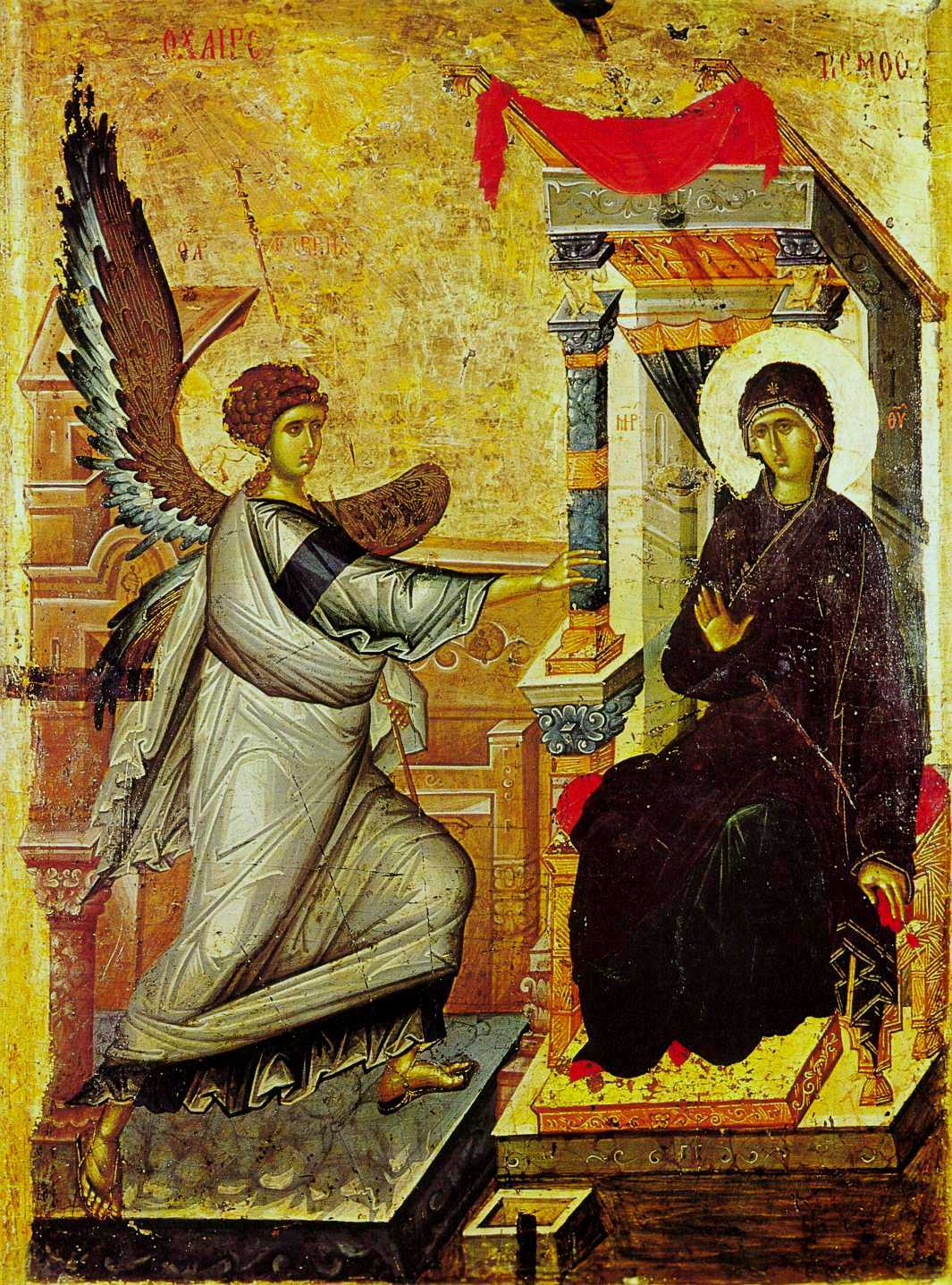
The Annunciation from Ohrid, one of the most admired icons of the Paleologan Mannerism from the Church of St Clement

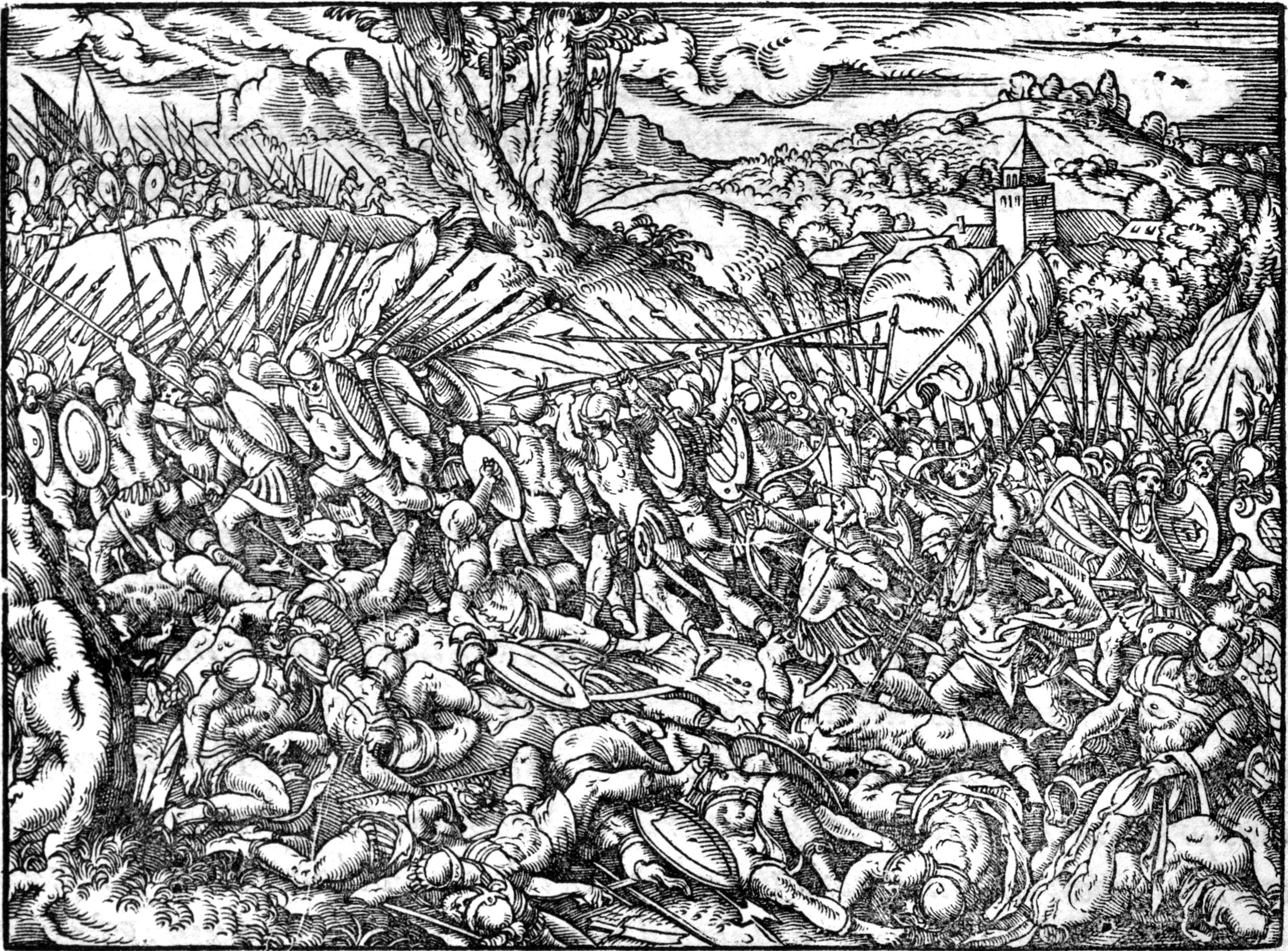
The Battle of Ohrid in 1464 where the Albanian ruler Skanderbeg defeated the Ottomans

The South Slavs began to arrive in the area during the 6th century AD. By the early 7th century, it was colonized by a Slavic tribe known as the Berziti. Bulgaria conquered the city around 840.

The name Ohrid first appeared in 879. The Ohrid Literary School, established in 886 by Clement of Ohrid, became one of the two major cultural centres of the First Bulgarian Empire. Between 990 and 1015, Ohrid was the empire's capital and stronghold.

From 990 to 1018, Ohrid was also the seat of the Bulgarian Patriarchate. After the Byzantine reconquest of the city in 1018 by Basil II, the Bulgarian Patriarchate was downgraded to an Archbishopric of Ohrid, and placed under the authority of the Ecumenical Patriarch of Constantinople.

The higher clergy after 1018 was almost invariably Greek, including during the period of Ottoman domination, until the abolition of the archbishopric in 1767. At the beginning of the 16th century, the archbishopric reached its peak, subordinating the Sofia, Vidin, Vlach and Moldavian eparchies, part of the former medieval Serbian Patriarchate of Peć, (including Patriarchal Monastery of Peć itself), and even the Orthodox districts of Italy (Apulia, Calabria and Sicily), Venice and Dalmatia.

As an episcopal city, Ohrid was a cultural center of great importance for the Balkans. Almost all surviving churches were built by the Byzantines and by the Bulgarians, with the rest dating back to the short time of Serbian rule during the late Middle Ages.

Bohemond, leading a Norman army from southern Italy, took the city in 1083. The Byzantines regained it in 1085. Albanian ruler Golem of Kruja (~1250) likely had had control over Ohrid but it was later ceded to the Byzantine Empire by negotiation. In the 13th and 14th century, the city changed hands between the Despotate of Epirus, the Bulgarian, Byzantine and Serbian Empires, and Albanian rulers. In the mid-13th century, Ohrid was one of the cities ruled by Pal Gropa, a member of the Albanian noble Gropa family. In a text by Emperor John VI Kantakouzenos, there is mention of nomadic Albanians present in the vicinity of Ohrid at around 1328. The presence of the Turkish community dates from their settlement in Ohrid during 1451–81.

In 1334, the city was captured by Stefan Uroš IV Dušan and incorporated in the Serbian Empire. After Dusan's death, the city came under the control of Andrea Gropa. After his death, Prince Marko incorporated it in the Kingdom of Prilep.

In the early 1370s, Marko lost Ohrid to Pal II Gropa, another member of the Gropa family, and unsuccessfully tried to recapture it in 1375 with Ottoman assistance.

In 1395, the Ottomans under Bayezid I captured the city, which became the seat of the newly established Sanjak of Ohrid. Some time after Gjergj Kastrioti Skanderbeg had liberated Krujë to begin his rebellion, his troops—in coordination with Gjergj Arianiti and Zaharia Gropa (of the local Albanian Gropa noble family)—liberated Ohrid and the castle of Svetigrad.

From 14–15 September 1464, 12,000 Albanian troops of the League of Lezhë and 1,000 of the Republic of Venice defeated a 14,000-man Ottoman force near the city in the Battle of Ohrid. When Mehmed II returned from Albania after his actions against Skanderbeg in 1466, he dethroned Dorotheos, the Archbishop of Ohrid, and expatriated him—together with his clerks and boyars and considerable number of citizens of Ohrid—to Istanbul, probably because of their anti-Ottoman activities during Skanderbeg's rebellion amid which many citizens of Ohrid, including Dorotheos and his clergy, supported Skanderbeg and his fight.

=== Ottoman period ===
During the 16th century, Ohrid was located in the Sanjak of Ohrid. In the years 1529–1536, Sanjak of Ohrid had 33,271 households (32,648 Christians and 623 Muslims), with 1331 widows and 3392 unmarried singles. There were 859 settlements and 10 cities, with an average of 28.7 houses per settlement. Ohrid itself had 337 Christian families, 44 unmarried singles, 12 widows and 93 Muslim families. In 1583, the Sanjak of Ohrid was made up of several Kazas, including the Kaza of Ohrid, which were in turn made of Nahiyes; the Ottoman Defter recorded, within the Nahiya of Ohrid, 2,920 Christian homes, 627 unmarried singles and 465 Muslim families within a total of 107 settlements.

In 1889, according to a French research, the city had 2.500-3.000 houses and approximately 12.000 individuals, of which 2/3 were Bulgarians and Vlachs and the rest 1/3 were Albanophone Muslims with 20-25 Slavophone Greek families. The Christian population declined during the first centuries of Ottoman rule. In 1664, there were only 142 Christian households. The situation changed in the 18th century when Ohrid emerged as an important trade center on a major trade route. At the end of this century it had around five thousand inhabitants.

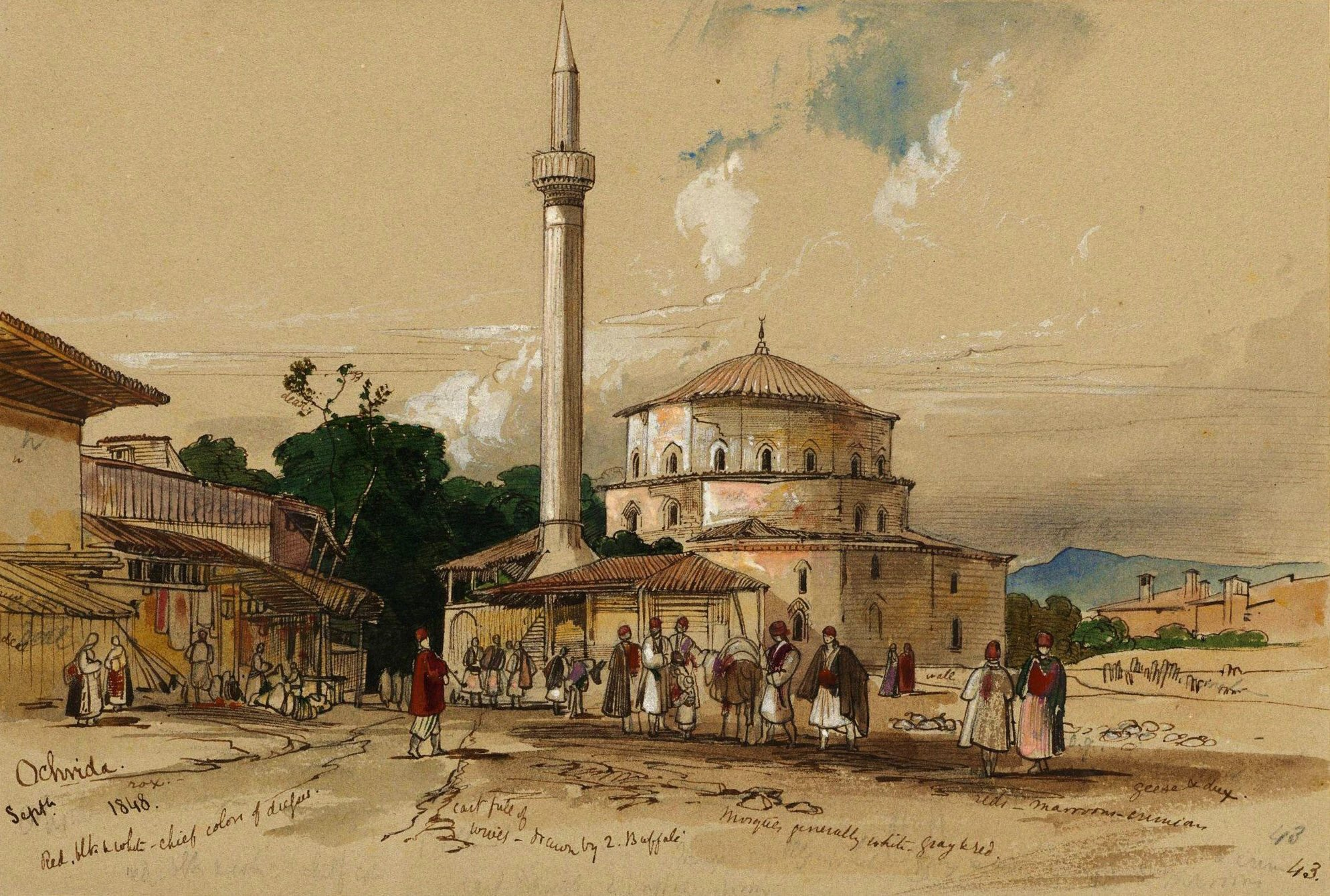
“Ochrida" by Edward Lear, 1848

Towards the end of the 18th century and in the early part of the 19th century, Ohrid region, like other parts of European Turkey, was a hotbed of unrest. In the 19th century the region of Ohrid became part of the Pashalik of Scutari, ruled by the Bushati family.

After the Christian population of the bishopric of Ohrid voted on a plebiscite in 1874 overwhelmingly in favour of joining the Bulgarian Exarchate (97%), the Exarchate became in control of the area. In 1889, Gustav Weigand discovered in Ohrid the important Codex Dimonie, a collection of Aromanian-language religious texts. In statistics gathered by Vasil Kanchov in 1900, the city of Ohrid was inhabited by 8000 Bulgarians, 5000 Turks, 500 Muslim Albanians, 300 Christian Albanians, 460 Vlachs and 600 Romani. The Bulgarian researcher Vasil Kanchov wrote in 1900 that many Albanians declared themselves as Turks. Ohrid, the population that declared itself Turkish "was of Albanian blood", but it "had been Turkified after the Ottoman invasion, including Skanderbeg", referring to Islamization.

The majority of the Christian inhabitants of the city were under the supremacy of the Bulgarian Exarchate. According to " La Macédoine et sa Population Chrétienne ", statistics of the secretary of the exarchate Dimitar Mishev on the Christian population in Macedonia, in 1905 the Christian population of Ohrid consisted of 7,768 Exarchist Bulgarians, 168 Greek Patriarchal Bulgarians, 56 Serboman Patriarchal Bulgarians, 660 Vlachs and 6 Albanians. In the city there is 1 secondary and 5 primary Bulgarian schools and 1 primary Greek, Serbian and Wallachian school each.

Modern Albanian study claims that in 1903 the Cartographic Society of Sofia registered incorrectly 8,893 households of Albanian or Vlach ethnicity in the Kaza of Ohrid. There were supposedly 2,610 households registered in Ohrid, but after further analysis of the documents by Dervishi et al., it was discovered that the city actually had 3,700 households; there were 2,100 Albanian Muslim households, 150 Albanian Christian households, 900 Bulgarian households, 300 Vlach households, 210 Serb households and 39 Greek households. The Cartographic Society of Sofia also incorrectly registered many villages - that were in fact inhabited entirely or mostly by Albanians (both Christians and Muslims) - as Bulgarian. 14 villages were registered as Albanian with 991 households, but further investigation by Dervishi et al. revealed that the number was actually 2,400. Therefore, with those corrections, the Kaza of Ohrid had 5,336 Albanian households, 4,347 Slavic households, 1,549 mixed household and 125 Vlach households that were mainly spread across two villages. By the end of Ottoman rule, the Kaza of Ohrid itself numbered to 38,000 Albanian inhabitants and 36,500 non-Albanian (Bulgarian, Serbs, Vlachs and Orthodox Albanians who recognised the exarch and were therefore classed as Bulgarians) inhabitants as indicated by statistics gathered from the Ottoman authorities.

=== Modern ===
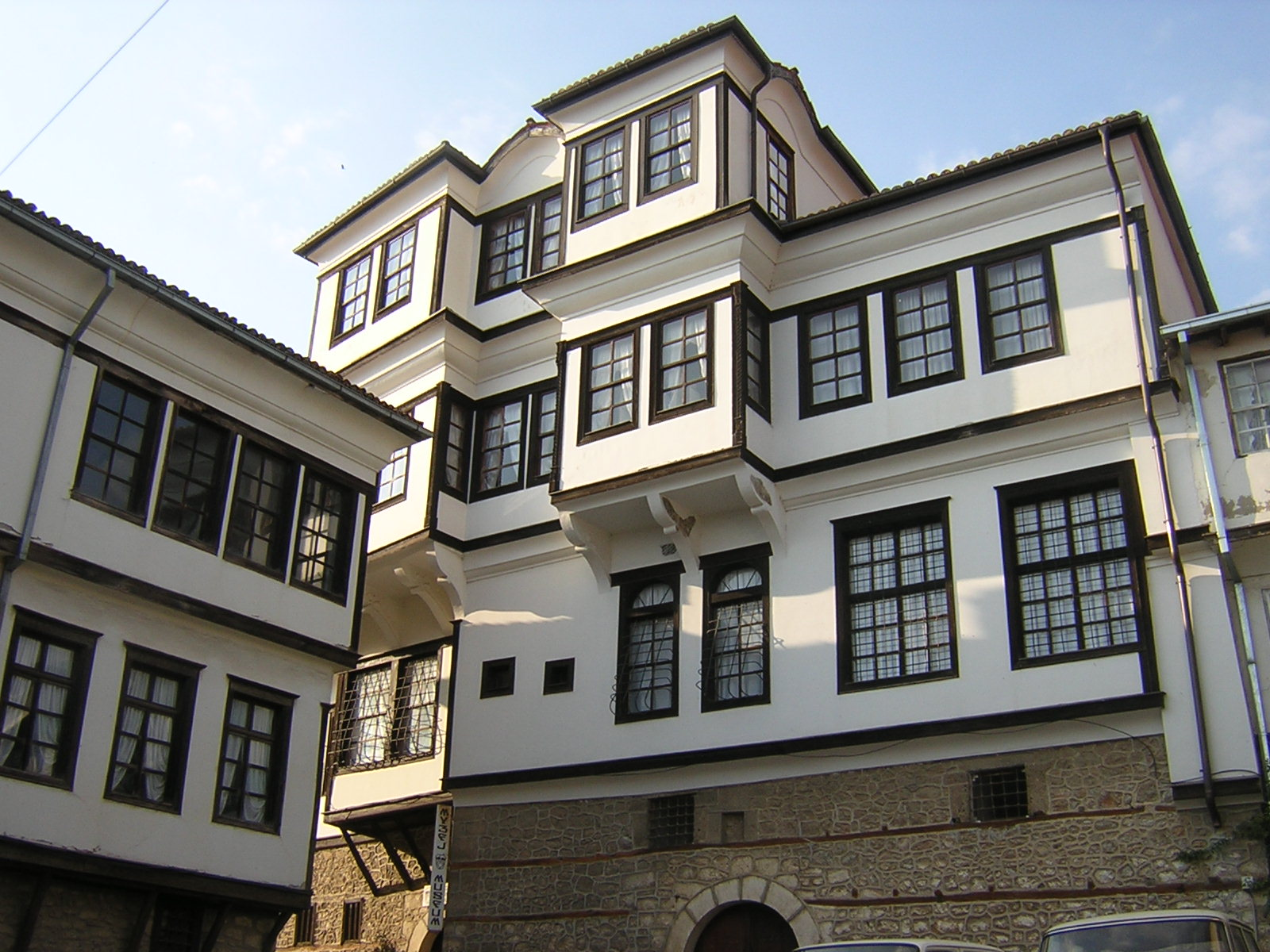
The house of the wealthy Robevi family

Before 1912, Ohrid was a township center bounded to Monastir sanjak in Manastir Vilayet (present-day Bitola). The city remained under Ottoman rule until 29 November 1912, when the Serbian army took control of the city during the Balkan Wars and later made it the capital of Ohrid district. In Ohrid, Serbian forces killed 150 Bulgarians and 500 people consisting of Albanians and Turks. In September 1913 local Albanian and pro-Bulgarian Internal Macedonian Revolutionary Organization leaders rebelled against the Kingdom of Serbia. It was occupied by Kingdom of Bulgaria between 1915 and 1918 during World War I.

Bulgarian ethnographer Yordan Ivanov, professor at the University of Sofia, wrote in 1915 that Albanians, since they did not have their own alphabet, lacked a consolidated national consciousness and were being influenced by foreign propaganda, declared themselves as Turks, Greeks and Bulgarians, depending on which religion they belonged to. Albanians in Ohrid were losing their mother tongue.

During Kingdom of Yugoslavia Ohrid continued to be as an independent district (Охридски округ) (1918–1922), then it became a part of Bitola Oblast (1920–1929), and then from 1929 to 1941, Ohrid was part of the Vardar Banovina. It was occupied again by Bulgaria between 1941 and 1944 during World War II. Since the days of SFR Yugoslavia Ohrid has been the municipal seat of Municipality of Ohrid (Општина Охрид). Since 1991 the town was part of the Republic of Macedonia (now North Macedonia).

On 20 November 1993, Avioimpex Flight 110 crashed near Ohrid, killing all 116 people on board. It is the deadliest aviation disaster to occur in North Macedonia.

== Geography and climate ==
Ohrid is located in the south-western part of North Macedonia, on the shore of Lake Ohrid, at an elevation of 695 meters above sea level.

Ohrid has a warm-summer mediterranean climate (Köppen climate classification: Csb), bordering on an oceanic climate (Köppen climate classification: Cfb) moderated by its elevation, as the mean temperature of the warmest month is just above 22 °C (71.6 °F) and every summer month receives less than 40 millimetres (1.6 in) of rainfall. The coldest month is January with the average temperature 2.5 °C (36.5 °F) or in a range between 6.2 °C (43.2 °F) and −1.5 °C (29.3 °F). The warmest month is August with average range of 27.7 °C (82 °F)-14.2 °C (57.6 °F). The rainiest month is November, which sees on average 90.5 mm (3.6 in) of rain. The summer months of June, July and August receive the least amount of rain, around 30 mm (1.2 in). The absolute minimum temperature is −17.8 °C (0.0 °F) and the maximum 38.5 °C (101.3 °F).

Climate data for Ohrid
Month	Jan	Feb	Mar	Apr	May	Jun	Jul	Aug	Sep	Oct	Nov	Dec	Year
Mean daily maximum °C (°F)	6.2 (43.2)	7.6 (45.7)	11.0 (51.8)	15.1 (59.2)	20.4 (68.7)	24.8 (76.6)	27.6 (81.7)	27.7 (81.9)	23.6 (74.5)	17.7 (63.9)	11.6 (52.9)	7.2 (45.0)	16.7 (62.1)
Mean daily minimum °C (°F)	−1.5 (29.3)	−0.9 (30.4)	1.2 (34.2)	4.6 (40.3)	8.7 (47.7)	12.0 (53.6)	14.0 (57.2)	14.2 (57.6)	11.2 (52.2)	7.2 (45.0)	3.1 (37.6)	0.0 (32.0)	6.2 (43.2)
Average precipitation mm (inches)	53.7 (2.11)	60.2 (2.37)	55.9 (2.20)	55.9 (2.20)	56.7 (2.23)	33.5 (1.32)	30 (1.2)	30.6 (1.20)	47.9 (1.89)	76.1 (3.00)	90.5 (3.56)	71.3 (2.81)	662.3 (26.09)
Average precipitation days	11	12	11	13	12	8	6	6	7	10	12	13	121
Source: World Meteorological Organisation (UN)

== Demographics ==
Historical population
Year	Pop.	±% p.a.
1948	11,169	—
1953	12,640	+2.51%
1961	16,492	+3.38%
1971	26,369	+4.81%
1981	39,093	+4.02%
1991	42,908	+0.94%
2002	42,033	−0.19%
2021	38,818	−0.42%

At the 2021 census, Ohrid had 38,818 residents with the following ethnic makeup:

- Macedonians, 28,920 (74.5%)
- Persons for whom data are taken from administrative sources, 3,421 (8.8%)
- others, 2,728 (7.0%)
- Albanians, 1,924 (5.0%)
- Turks, 1,825 (4.7%)

As of the 2002 census, the city of Ohrid has 42,033 inhabitants and the ethnic composition was the following:

- Macedonians, 33,791 (80.4%)
- Albanians, 2,959 (7.0%)
- Turks, 2,256 (5.4%)
- others, 3,027 (7.2%)

The mother tongues of the city's residents include the following:

- Macedonian, 34,910 (83.1%)
- Albanian, 3,957 (9.4%)
- Turkish, 2,226 (5.3%)
- others, 1,017 (2.4%)

The religious composition of the city was the following:

- Orthodox Christians, 33,987 (80.9%)
- Muslims, 7,599 (18.1%)
- others, 447 (1.1%)

The oldest inhabitants of Ohrid are a few families that reside in the Varoš neighbourhood. Other Macedonians have settled in Ohrid and originate from the villages of the Kosel, Struga, Drimkol, Debarca, Malesija and Kičevo regions and other areas from southern Macedonia. Albanians in Ohrid originate from Albanian villages located on the western and southern areas of Lake Ohrid. There is a sizeable amount of Turkified Albanians in Ohrid who originate from the cities of Elbasan, Durrës and Ulcinj. The local Romani population in Ohrid originates from Podgradec and speaks the southern Tosk Albanian dialect.

The earliest presence of the Aromanian population in Ohrid dates to 1778 arriving from Moscopole, others from Kavajë (late 18th century), from the Myzeqe region, Elbasan, Llëngë and Mokër region (mid. 19th century) and also from Gorna Belica and Malovišta (late 19th century). A large part of Ohrid's Aromanian population has emigrated to Trieste, Odessa and Bucharest. Orthodox Albanians are also present and settled in Ohrid during the second half of the 19th century and originate from Pogradec, Lin, Çërravë and Peshkopi.

All Turks from the village of Peštani after selling properties and land moved to Ohrid by 1920 and today those few families are known as Peştanlı. In 1949, additional families from Aegean Macedonia settled in Ohrid.

In Yugoslav censuses, Albanophone Ohrid Romani mainly declared as Albanians. As tensions between Albanians and the state increased over numbers regarding community size and sociopolitical rights, Romani identity became politicized and contested from the 1990s onward. Ohrid Albanophone Romani refused identification as Albanians seeing it as a result of Albanisation (or to be called Gypsies) and with encouragement from Macedonian circles now refers to itself as Egyptians whose ancestors migrated from Egypt many centuries ago. The Albanian language is considered by Ohrid Albanophone Romani as only an idiom of the home and not a mother tongue. Turkish speaking Romani reside in Ohrid that during the Yugoslav period self declared themselves mainly as Turks, while within independent Macedonia they identify as Egyptians. In the latter decades of the 20th century, some Albanian speaking Muslim Romani from the villages of Krani and Nakolec have migrated to Ohrid.

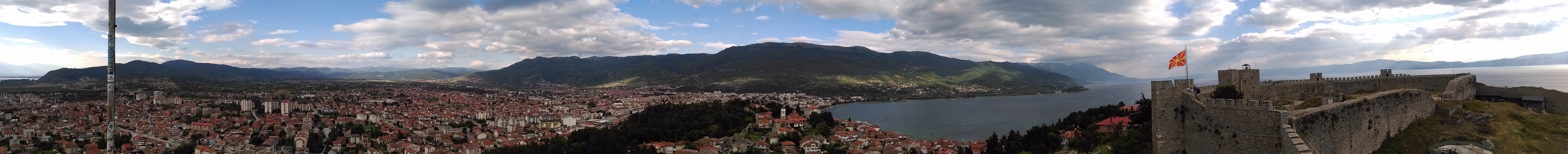
Panorama of Ohrid

== Cultural Heritage sites ==
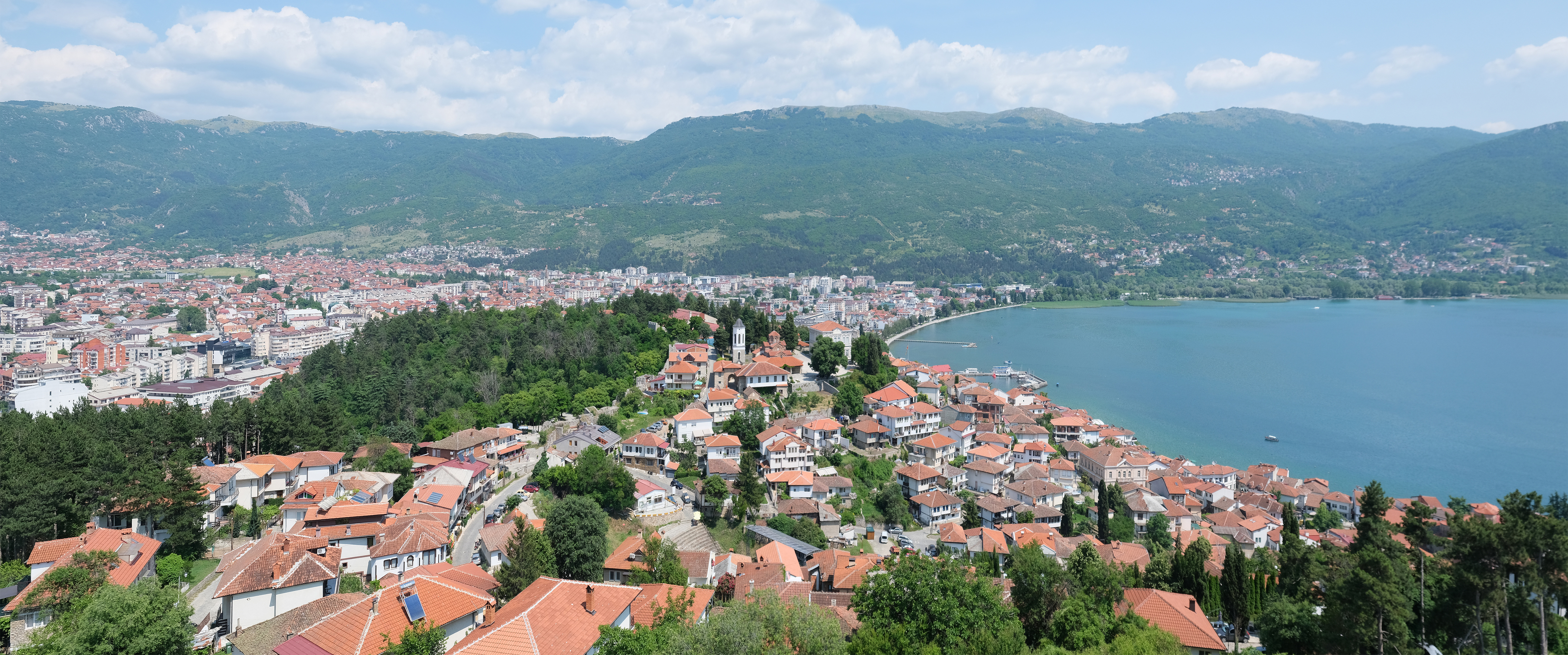
Ohrid

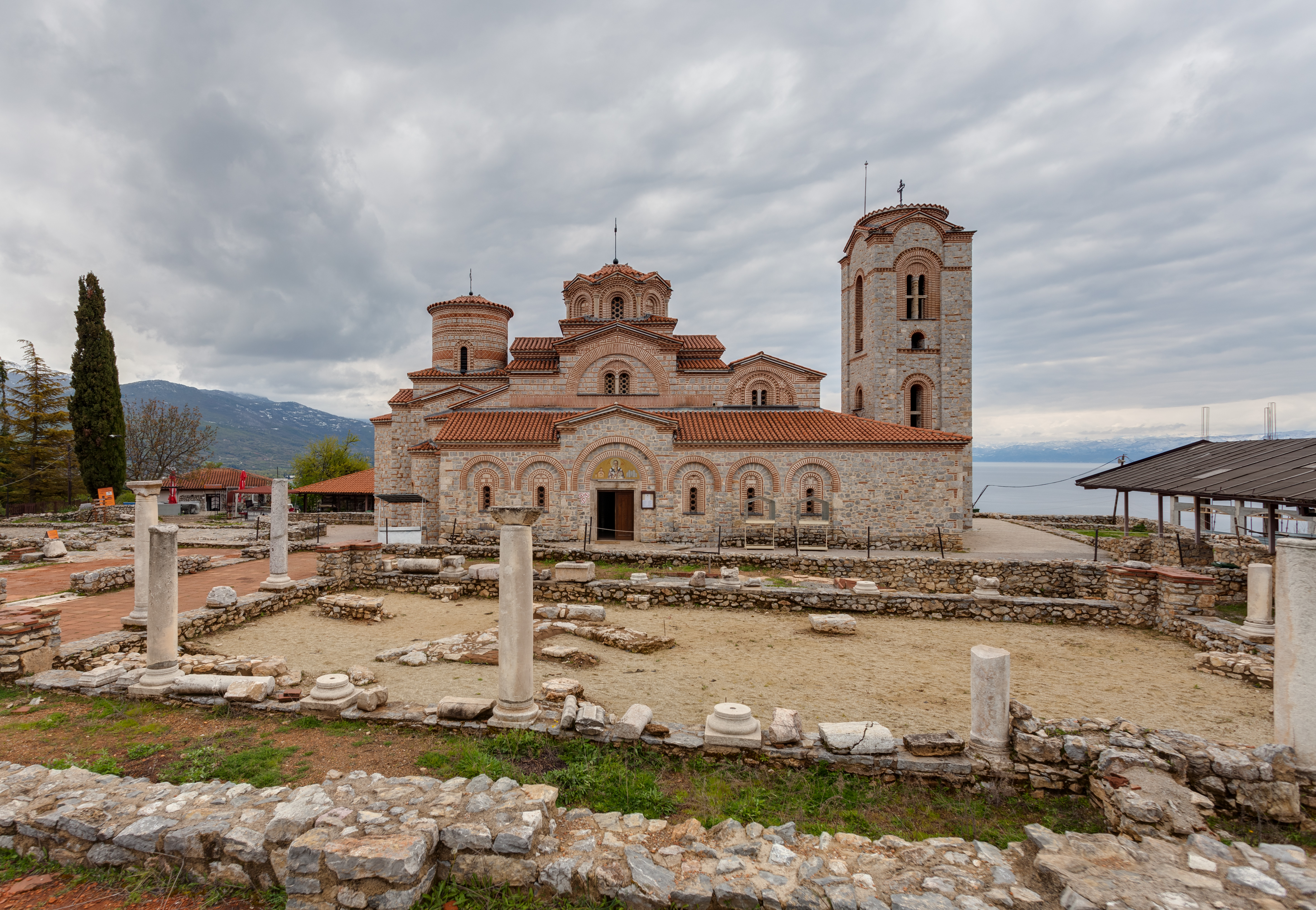
The church of St. Clement and St. Panteleimon in Ohrid

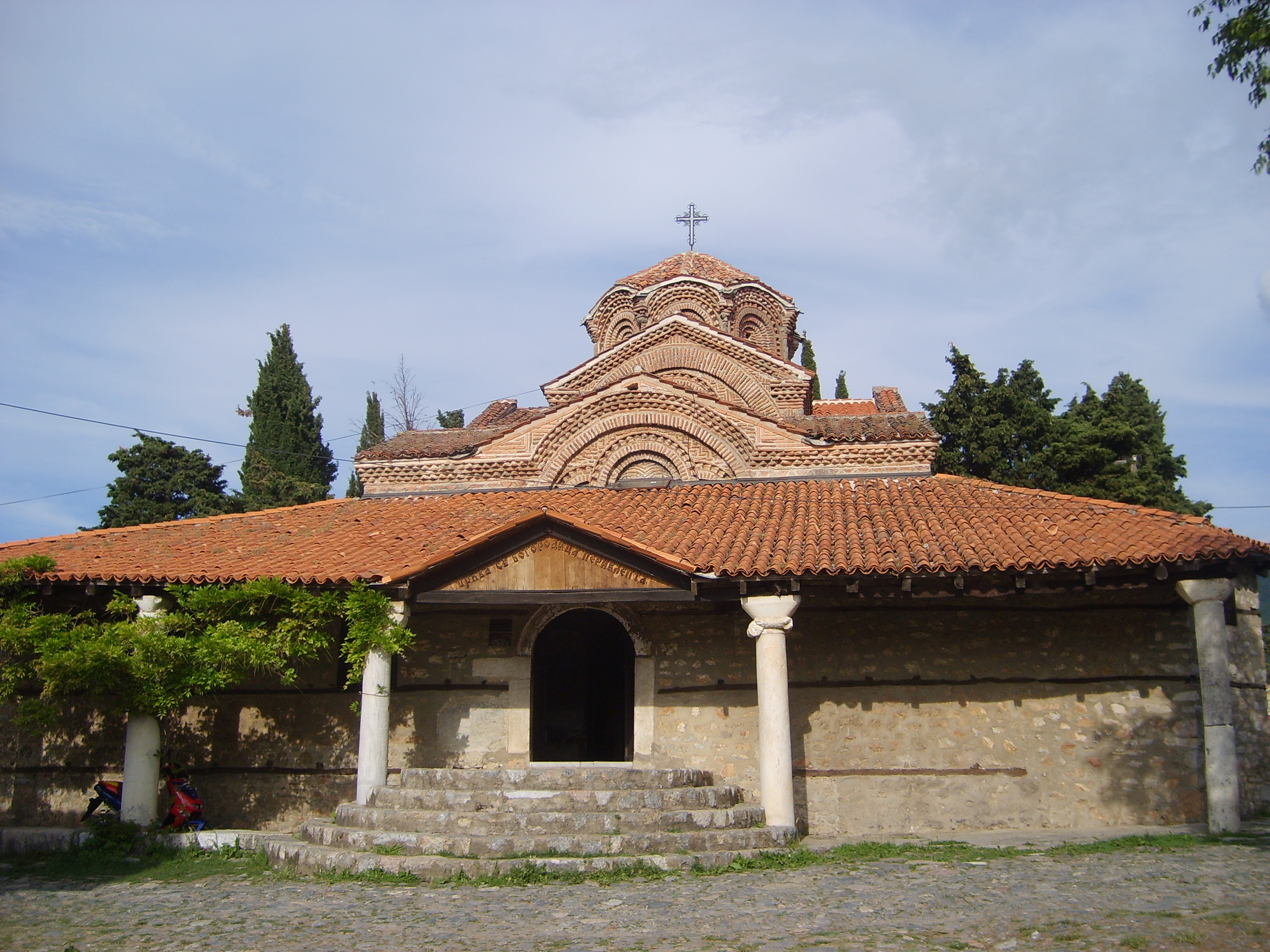
Mother of God Perybleptos church, located across the icon gallery

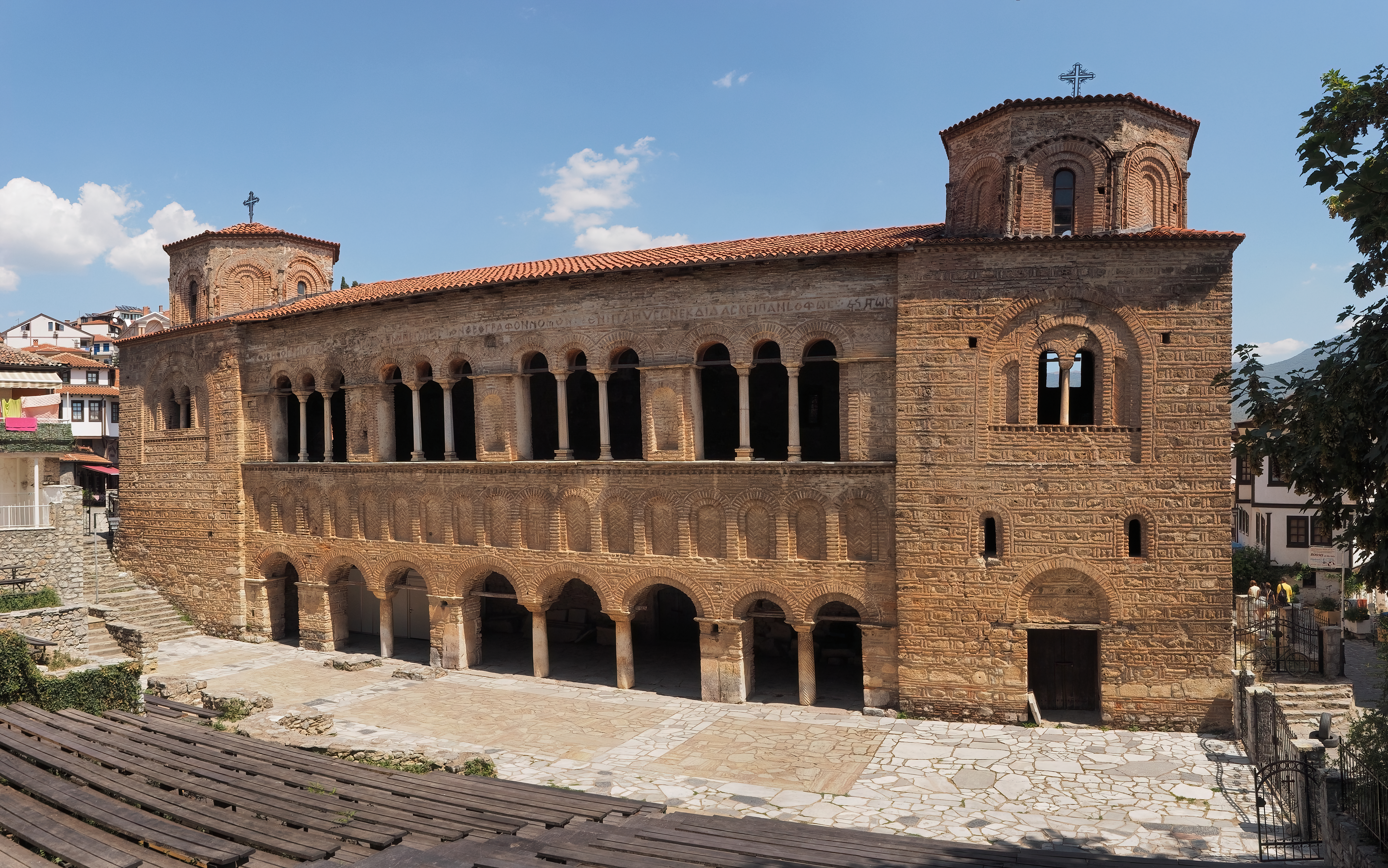
Church of Saint Sophia

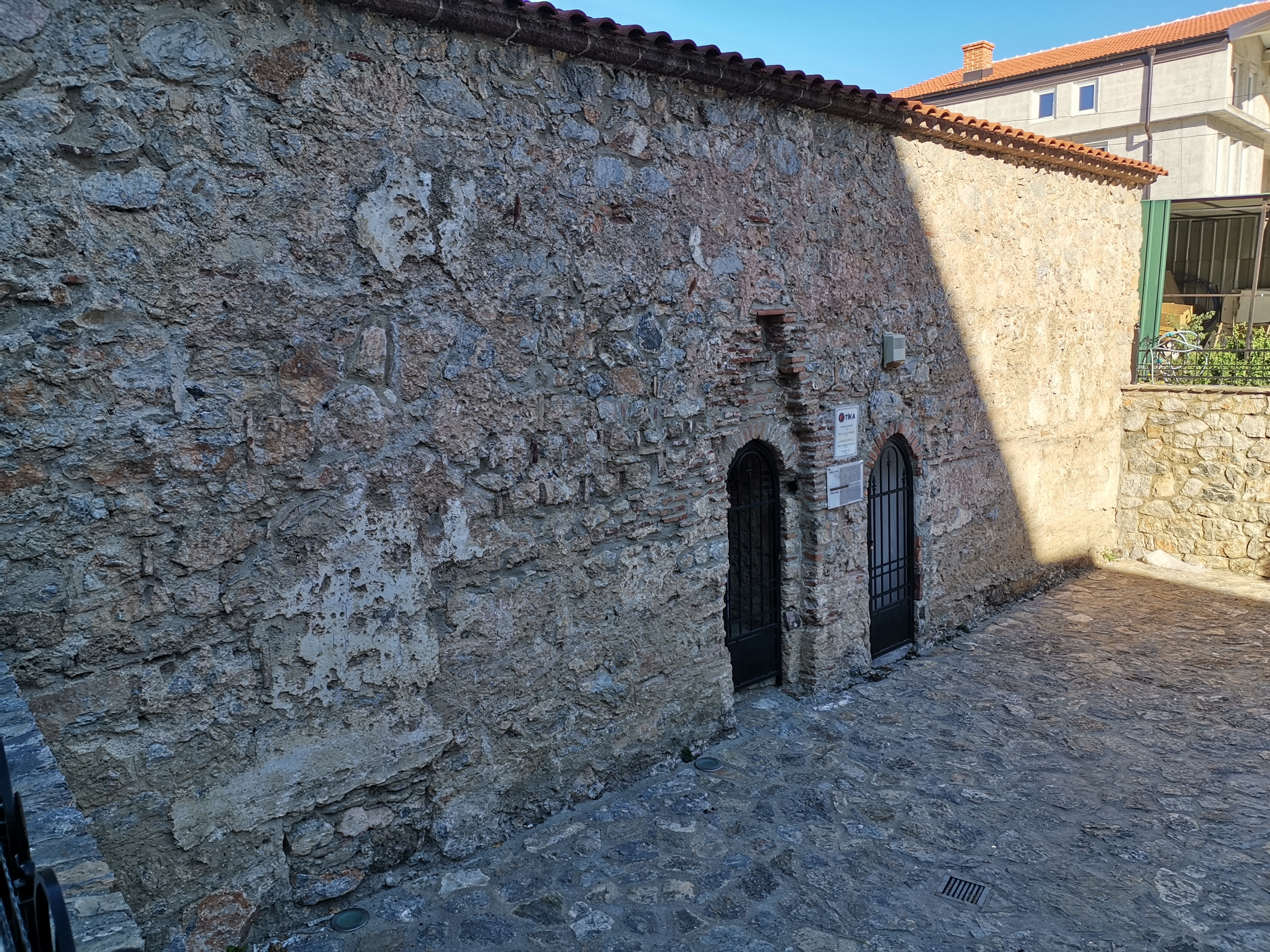
Voska Hamam

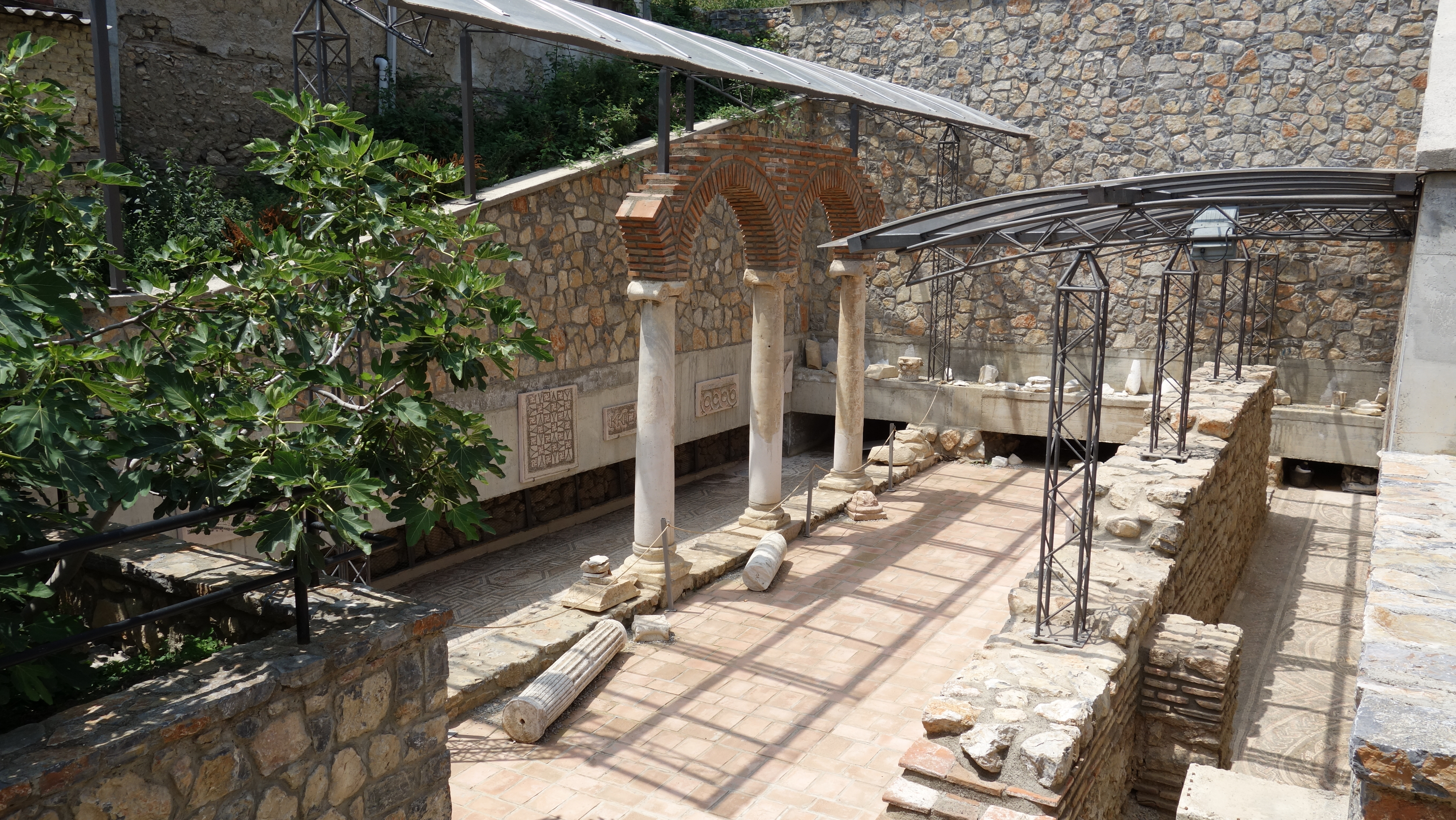
Mančevci early Christian basilica

Ohrid Municipality is home to over 100 sites declared as Cultural Heritage by the Ministry of Culture, of which most lie within the city of Ohrid.

=== Archaeological sites ===
- Ancient Theatre of Ohrid from Hellenistic and Roman time
- Vidobišta Roman-era tombs
- Kozluk, Roman-era settlement
- Mančevci site with early Christian basilica
- Hermeleja, Roman-era settlement
- Saint Erasmus
- Karagjulevci tombs from Ancient Macedonian era
- Samuel's Fortress and remaining portions of the city walls
- Plaošnik
- Studenčišta basilica
- Saint 40 Holy Martyrs early Christian basilica

=== Christian sites ===
There is a legend supported by observations by the 17th century Ottoman traveler Evliya Çelebi that there were 365 chapels within the town boundaries, one for every day of the year. Today this number is significantly smaller.

- Grave of Grigor Prličev
- Church of Saints Clement and Panteleimon
- Church of the Holy Mother of God Čelnica
- Little Church of Saint Vrači (Saints Kuzman and Damjan)
- Church of Saint Demetrius
- Church of the Holy Mother of God - Bolnička
- Church of Saint Nicholas - Bolnički
- Church of the Holy Mother of God - Perivleptos
- Little Church of Saint Clement
- Church of Saint John the Baptist - Kaneo
- Church of Saint Sophia
- Church of Saints Constantine and Elena
- Church of the Holy Mother of God Kamensko
- Church of Saint Nicholas - Gerakomija
- Church of Saint Nicholas - Arbanaški
- Church of Saint Nicholas the Wonderworker
- Church of Saint Vrači (Saints Kuzman and Damjan), with frescos from the 14th century. A 14th-century icon from the church is depicted on the obverse of the 1000 denars banknote, issued in 1996 and 2003.
- Church of Saint George
- Church of Saint Nicholas

Besides being a holy center of the region, it is also the source of knowledge and pan-Slavic literacy. The restored Monastery at Plaošnik was actually one of the oldest Universities in the western world, dating before the 10th century. Several of Ohrid's best-known churches and monasteries, such as the Monastery of Saint Naum lie in its surrounding villages.

=== Islamic sites ===
- Voska Hamam
- Eski Hamam
- Zejnel Abedin Pasha Tekke
- Sinan Çelebi Türbe
- Ali Pasha Mosque
- Hajdar Pasha Mosque
- Hadži Durgut Mosque
- Hadži Hamza Mosque

=== National Liberation War sites ===
- Memorial mound on Slavej Planina
- Common grave of fallen National Liberation War soldiers
- Memorial plaque of fallen professors and students of the Ohrid Gymnasium in the National Liberation War

=== Old town architecture ===
Dozens of individual homes and commercial buildings in Ohrid are listed as Cultural Heritage sites. Some of these, such as the Robevi family house and the Prličev family home, the Uzunov family home, function as museums today. Also included are the Saint Clement of Ohrid Gymnasium, the Ohrid Clock Tower, and the Icon Gallery.

== Transportation ==
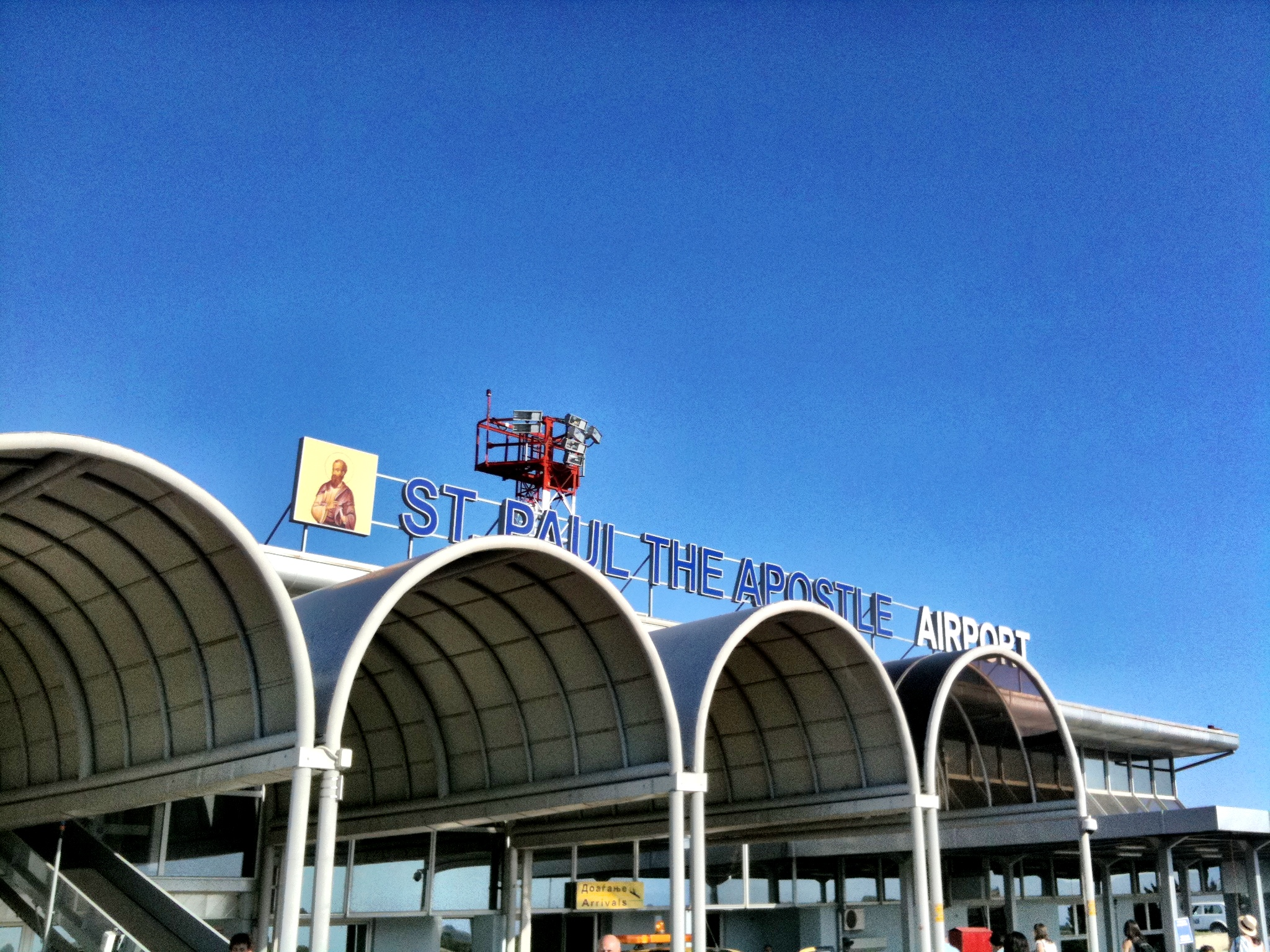
Ohrid "St. Paul the Apostle" Airport

There is a nearby international airport, Ohrid Airport (now known as "St. Paul the Apostle Airport").

Until 1966, Ohrid was linked to Skopje by the Ohrid line, a 167 kilometres (104 mi) long 600 mm narrow-gauge railway.

== Sports ==
GFK Ohrid Lihnidos is a football team playing at the SRC Biljanini Izvori stadium in the city. As of the 2025–26 season they play in the second tier of the Macedonian Football League system.

FK Voska Sport was also a football team in Ohrid that competes in the Macedonian First League as of the 2024–25 season. The club dissolved after the 2024-25 season.

RK Ohrid is a handball team playing at Biljanini Izvori Sports Hall arena, with a capacity of 3,500. As of the 2025–26 season they play in the Macedonian Handball Super League, which is the top tier.

The Ohrid Swimming Marathon is an international open water swimming competition, always taking place in the waters of Lake Ohrid. The swimmers are supposed to swim 30 km (19 mi) from the monastery of Saint Naum to the Ohrid harbor.

== Recurring events ==
- Ohrid Summer Festival, annual theater and music festival from July to August
- Ohrid Choir Festival, annual international choir festival at the end of August
- Balkan Folklore Festival, annual folklore music and dance festival at the beginning of July
- Balkan music square festival, music festival in August in which ethnic musicians from the whole Balkan peninsular participate
- Ohrid Fest (Охридски Трубадури), music festival in August in which musicians from the whole Balkan peninsular participate. This festival is held for four days which are divided into
  - Debutant Night,
  - Folk Night,
  - Pop Night and
  - International Night.
- World Prized of Humanism in the Ohrid Academy of Humanism, created by Jordan Plevnes
- Ohrid art and scientific meetings (Охридска научна и уметничка визита), held in House of Uranija-MANU, Ohrid by Macedonian academy of science and arts

== International relations ==
Kazakhstan maintains an honorary consulate in Ohrid.

=== Twin towns and sister cities ===
Ohrid is twinned with:

- Budva, Montenegro
- Caen, France
- Givatayim, Israel
- Inđija, Serbia
- Kragujevac, Serbia
- Mostar, Bosnia and Herzegovina
- Pogradec, Albania
- Piran, Slovenia
- Safranbolu, Turkey
- Stari Grad (Sarajevo), Bosnia and Herzegovina
- Vidovec, Croatia
- Vinkovci, Croatia
- Windsor, Canada
- Wollongong, Australia
- Yalova, Turkey

== See also ==
- Archbishopric of Ohrid
- List of archbishops of the Archbishopric of Ohrid
- List of people from Ohrid
- Ohrid Agreement
- Macedonian Orthodox Church – Ohrid Archbishopric
- Orthodox Ohrid Archbishopric

== Sources ==
- Wilkes, John (1992). The Illyrians. Wiley. ISBN 9780631146711.
