= Dobri =

Dobri means good in several Slavic languages and may refer to

- Dobri (given name)
- Dobri dol (disambiguation)
- Dobri Do (disambiguation)
- Dobri, Hungary, a village
- Dobri Dub, a village in Serbia
- Dobri Laki, a village in Bulgaria
- Novigrad na Dobri, a village in Croatia
- Don Dobri Airport in Chile
- Dobri Isak, a former Yugoslav post-punk/darkwave band
- Dobří holubi se vracejí, a 1987 Czech dark comedy

== See also ==
- Dobry (disambiguation)
