= Dobri Do =

Dobri Do (Serbian Cyrillic: Добри До) is a Serbo-Croatian place name, meaning "good dale". It may refer to:

Serbia

- Dobri Do, Ivanjica
- Dobri Do, Kuršumlija
- Dobri Do, Pirot
- Dobri Do, Smederevo

Bosnia and Herzegovina

- Dobri Do, Neum

== See also ==
- Dobri dol (disambiguation)
- Dobrodol (disambiguation)
- Dobrodo
