= Olesya Zhupanska =

Ukrainian-American engineer

Olesya I. Zhupanska is a Ukrainian and American mechanical engineer and materials scientist whose research concerns composite materials and their application in extreme environments, such as in wind turbine blades subject to lightning strikes. She is a professor in the Department of Aerospace & Mechanical Engineering at the University of Arizona, and is a member of the American Society for Composites, which she was the president of from 2024 to 2025.

== Education and career ==
Zhupanska graduated from the Taras Shevchenko National University of Kyiv in 1996 with a bachelor's and master's degree in mechanics and applied mathematics. She continued in the same program for a Ph.D. in 2000.

After holding postdoctoral and visiting positions at the University of Florida from 2002 to 2007, in 2007 she became an assistant professor in the Department of Mechanical and Industrial Engineering at the University of Iowa, where she was promoted to associate professor in 2013. In 2016, she moved to her present position as a full professor at the University of Arizona.

== Works ==
Zhupanska has 85 works credited to her. Among these includes, “Integrating variable wind load, aerodynamic, and structural analyses towards accurate fatigue life prediction in composite wind turbine blades”, in 2015.

== Recognition ==
Zhupanska's research with Air Force Research Laboratory scientist Bob Sierakowski won the 2007 American Society of Mechanical Engineers Boeing Best Paper Award. She was named an ASME Fellow in 2017. The University of Arizona listed her as one of the 2022 winners of their Women of Impact in Research & Innovation Award. She additionally is the recipient of DARPA's Young Faculty Award in 2011. In 2012, she was also given the Best Paper Award by the American Society of Composites at the organization's 27th annual conference.
