= Barovo =

Barovo may refer to:

- Barovo, Demir Kapija, North Macedonia
- Barovo, Sopište, North Macedonia
