= Sopište Municipality =

Municipality of North Macedonia

Coordinates: 41.96°N 21.41°E

Municipality of Sopište Општина Сопиште Komuna e Sopishtit
- Rural municipality
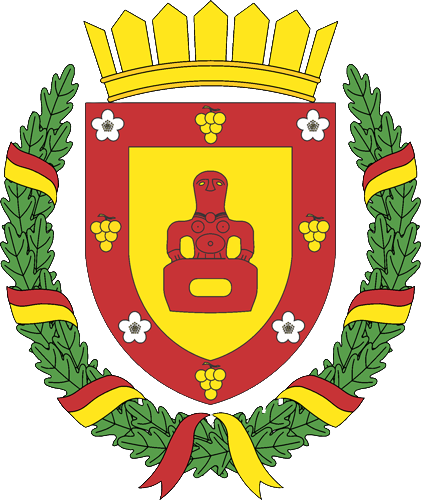
- Flag Coat of arms

- Country: North Macedonia
- Region: Skopje
- Municipal seat: Sopište

Government
  - Mayor: Jane Micevski (VMRO-DPMNE)

Area
  - Total: 222.1 km^{2} (85.8 sq mi)
- Highest elevation: 2,500 m (8,200 ft)
- Lowest elevation: 600 m (2,000 ft)

Population (2021)
  - Total: 6,713
  - Density: 30.23/km^{2} (78.28/sq mi)
- Time zone: UTC+1 (CET)
- Postal code: 1054
- Area code: 02
- Vehicle registration: SK

Sopište (Macedonian: Сопиште, Albanian: Sopisht) is a municipality in the northern part of North Macedonia. Sopište is also the name of the village where the municipal seat is found. It is located in the Skopje Statistical Region.

== Geography ==
The municipality borders the City of Skopje to the north, Želino Municipality and Makedonski Brod Municipality to the west, and Studeničani Municipality to the east.

== Demographics ==
According to the 2021 North Macedonia census, the municipality has 6,713 inhabitants. Ethnic groups in the municipality:

	2002		2021	
	Number	%	Number	%
TOTAL	5,656	100	6,713	100
Macedonians	3,404	60.18	4,045	60.26
Albanians	1,942	34.34	1,693	25.22
Turks	243	4.3	463	6.9
Serbs	32	0.56	49	0.73
Vlachs	4	0.07	19	0.28
Roma			1	0.01
Other / Undeclared / Unknown	31	0.55	33	0.49
Persons for whom data are taken from administrative sources			410	6.11

Demographic Trends Live births by ethnic affiliation of mother, 2010-2021

	Macedonians		Albanians		Turks		Others		TOTAL
Year	Births	%	Births	%	Births	%	Births	%	Births
2010	44	51.16	35	40.70	3	3.49	4	4.65	86
2011	37	39.78	45	48.39	7	7.53	4	4.30	93
2012	39	45.35	44	51.16	2	2.33	1	1.16	86
2013	44	40.37	56	51.38	7	6.42	2	1.83	109
2014	46	41.44	59	53.15	6	5.41	0	0.00	111
2015	51	49.04	50	48.08	1	0.96	2	1.92	104
2016	39	41.49	47	50.00	5	5.32	3	3.19	94
2017	47	47.47	46	46.46	5	5.05	1	1.01	99
2018	39	41.05	48	50.53	6	6.32	2	2.11	95
2019	38	38.38	50	50.51	8	8.08	3	3.03	99
2020	38	38.78	52	53.06	5	5.10	3	3.06	98
2021	34	42.50	40	50.00	6	7.50	0	0.00	80
2022	24	28.57	45	53.57	13	15.48	2	2.38	84
2023	41	48.24	35	41.18	8	9.41	1	1.18	85

== People from Sopište ==
- Igor Durlovski, a Macedonian opera singer
- Ana Durlovski, a Macedonian opera singer
- Rabi W. Sédrak, Immigration specialist and founder of Balkan's Integration and Immigration Program

== Inhabited places ==
The 5656 inhabitants of the municipality of Sopište live in 1510 houses and 3398 apartments. There are 13 settlements in Sopište with the absence of a classic urban center.

In the municipality there are the following settlements:

- Sopište 1365
- Rakotinci 394
- Dobri Dol 431
- Dolno Sonje 707
- Gorno Sonje 240
- Barovo 24
- Govrlevo 31
- Čiflik 664
- Sveta Petka 718
- Jabolče 44
- Nova Breznica 89
- Držilovo 365
- Patiška Reka 584
