= Patiška Reka =

Patiška Reka Патишка Река Patishka Rekë
- Village
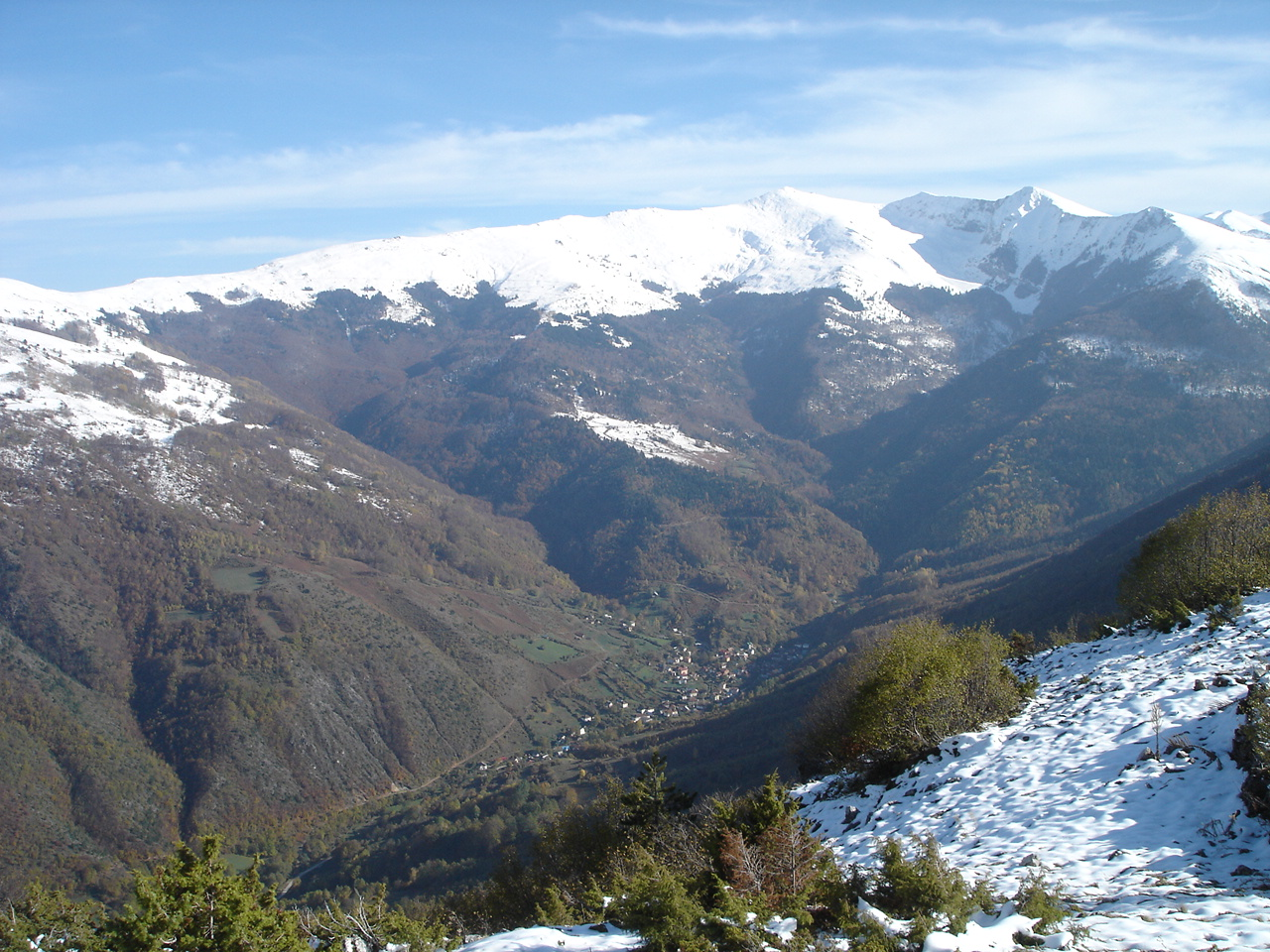
- Patiška Reka and Karadžica mountain

- Location within North Macedonia
- Coordinates: 41°48′N 21°19′E
- Country: North Macedonia
- Region: Skopje
- Municipality: Sopište

Population (2021)
  - Total: 231
- Time zone: UTC+1 (CET)
  - Summer (DST): UTC+2 (CEST)
- Car plates: SK
- Website: .

Patiška Reka (Macedonian: Патишка Река, Albanian: Patishka Rekë) is a village in the municipality of Sopište, North Macedonia.

== Demographics ==
In the 19th century some Christian Albanian speaking villagers from Upper Reka migrated to Patiška Reka where they constituted the local Orthodox village population and remained Albanian speaking until World War Two, living among Muslim Albanians before relocating to Skopje thereafter.

As of the 2021 census, Patiška Reka had 231 residents with the following ethnic composition:

- Albanians 191
- Persons for whom data are taken from administrative sources 39
- Turks 1

According to the 2002 census, the village had a total of 579 inhabitants. Ethnic groups in the village include:

- Albanians 579
