= Jakupica range =

Mountain range in North Macedonia

Jakupica Jakupicë
- Solunska Glava
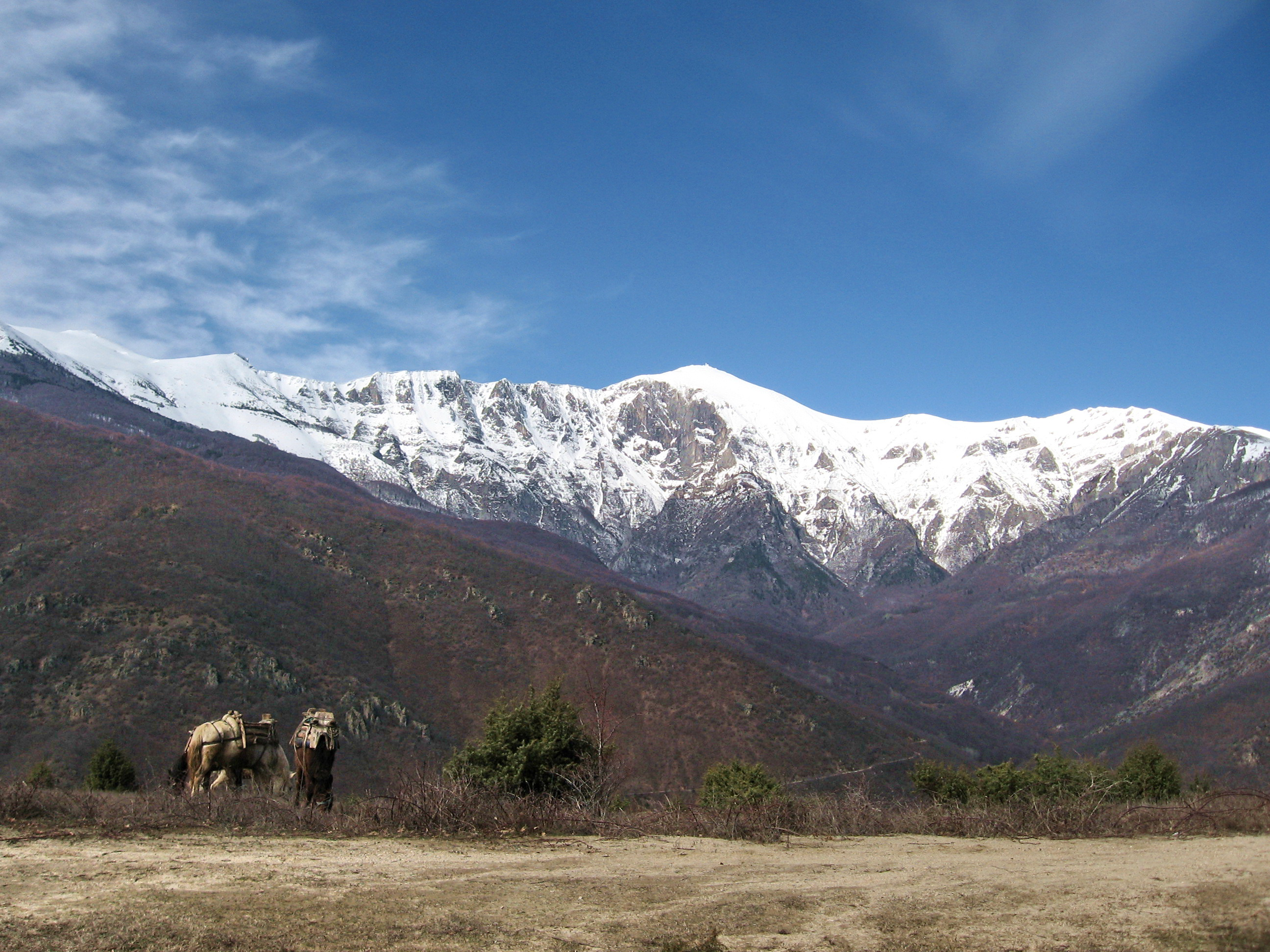
- Jakupica mountain with its peak Solunska Glava in the center

Highest point
- Elevation: 2,540 m (8,330 ft)
- Prominence: 1,666 m (5,466 ft)
- Listing: Ultra
- Coordinates: 41°42′15″N 21°24′19″E

Geography
- Location within North Macedonia
- Location: North Macedonia
- Parent range: Jakupica

Climbing
- Easiest route: Easy hike, but the very summit (approx. last 30 meters) is closed by military.

Jakupica (Macedonian: Јакупица, Albanian: Jakupicë) or Mokra (Macedonian: Мокра, Albanian: Mokër) is a mountain range in the central part of North Macedonia. The headwaters of the Axios river (Ancient Greek: Ἀξιός), mentioned by Homer (Il. 21.141, Il. 2.849) as the home of the Paeonians allies of Troy, spring from its flanks.

== Geography ==
The highest peak is Solunska Glava 2,540 m (8,333 ft). Other significant peaks are: Karadžica (Albanian: Karaxhicë, 2,473 m), Popovo Brdo (2,380 m), Ostar Breg (2,365 m), Ubava (Albanian: Ubavë, 2,353 m), Ostar Vrv (2,275 m), and Dautica (2,178 m). The mountain range can be easily approached from the capital Skopje, or from the town of Veles and many villages in the area. On clear days, from the peak Solunska Glava, one can see the city of Thessaloniki in Greece.

== Environment ==
The relief is criss-crossed by numerous clear and fast mountain rivers. Large areas are covered with beech, oak, and conifer forests. There are also obvious traces of the primeval glaciation from the diluvial period. A number of institutions have been recommending this area (as well as the Šar Mountains) as a national park. A 19,600 ha area of the mountain range has been designated an Important Bird Area (IBA) by BirdLife International because it supports populations of golden eagles, yellow-billed choughs, wallcreepers and alpine accentors.

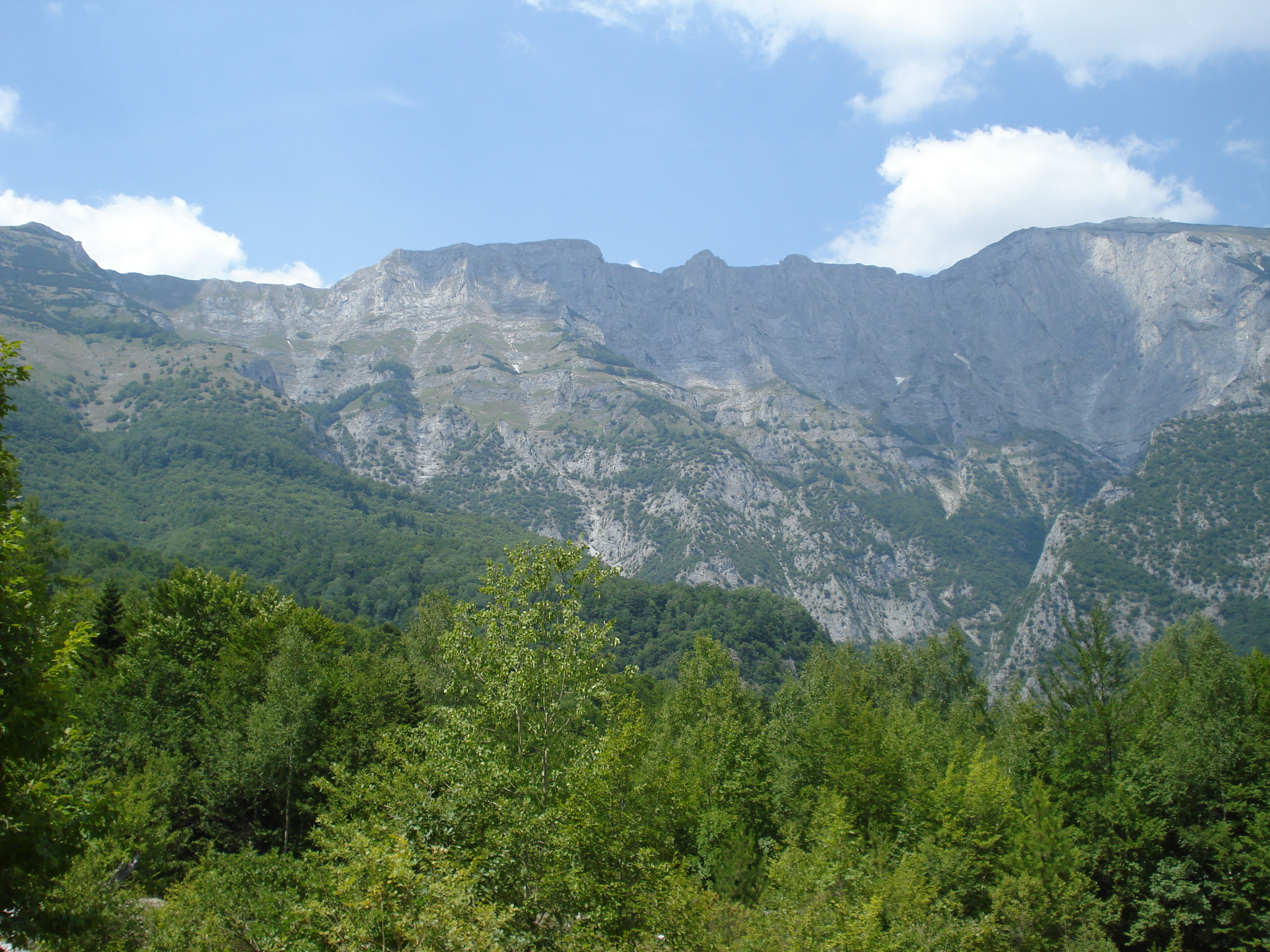
Landscape of Jakupica, Solunska Glava at far right

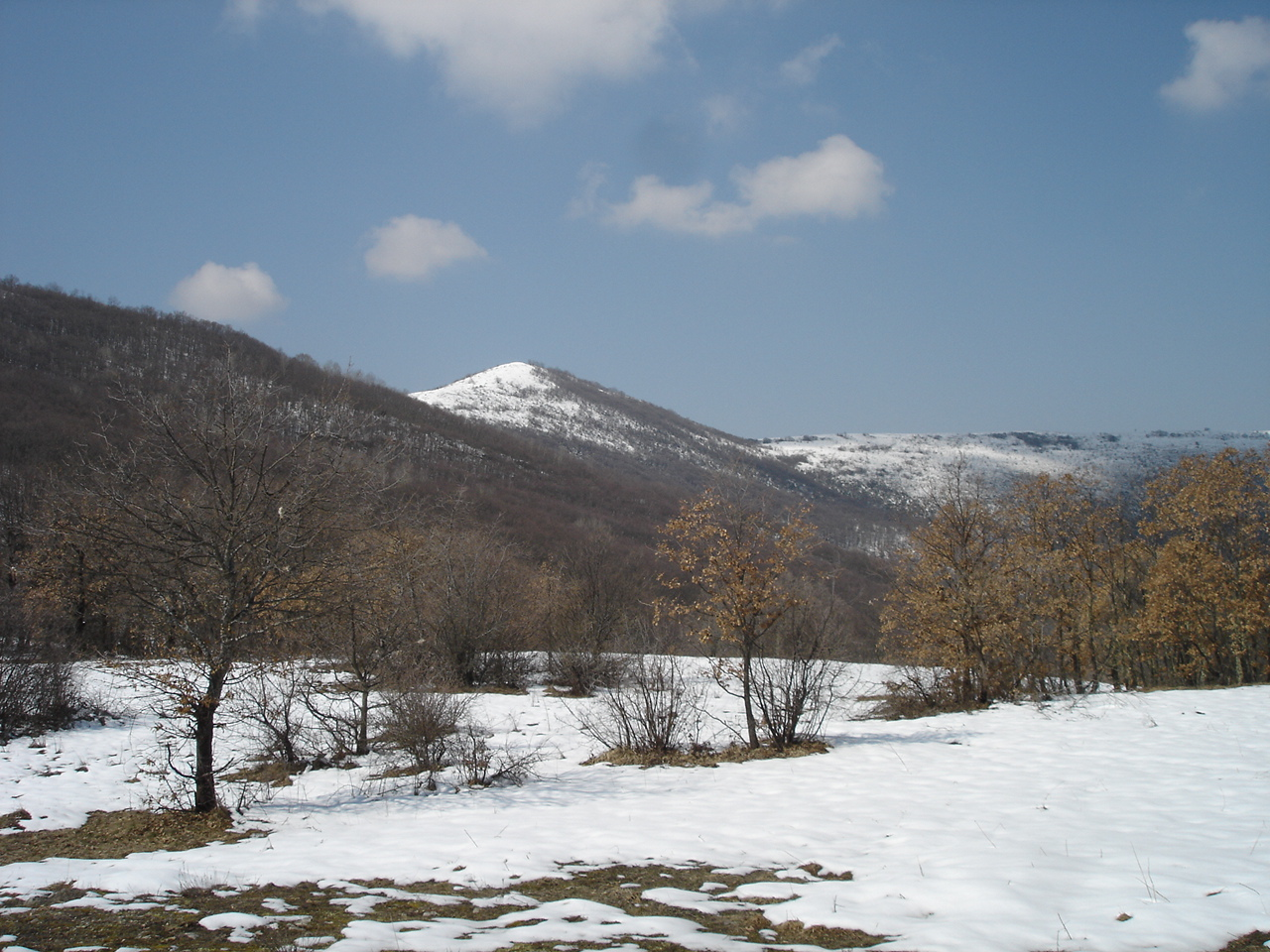
Dautica mountain

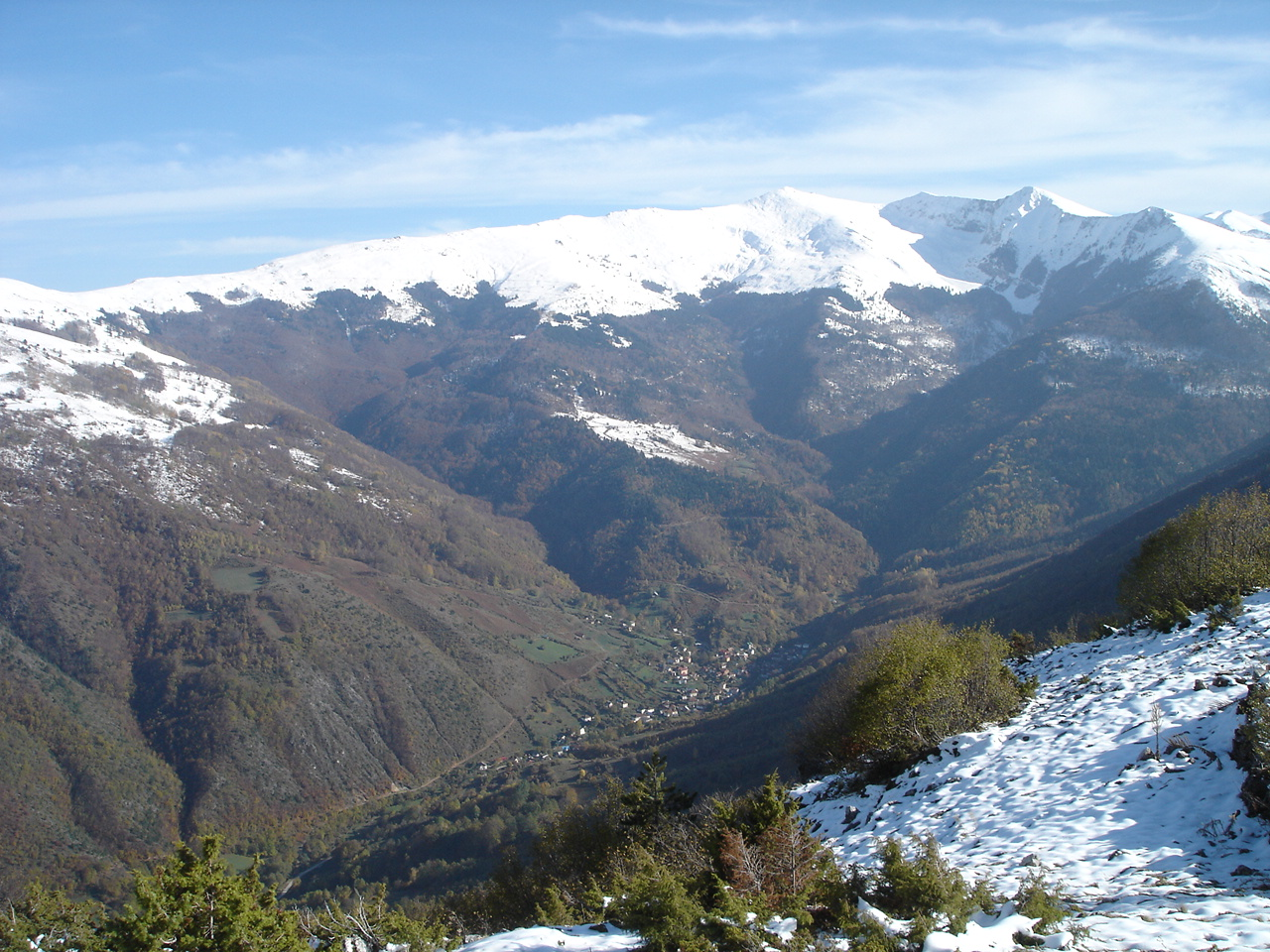
Karadžica mountain and Patiška Reka village

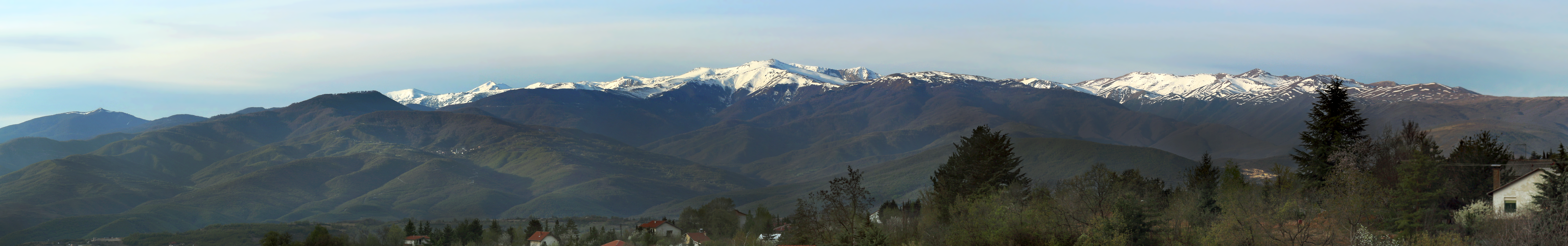
Jakupica mountain range, as seen from Dolno Sonje, North Macedonia, with the highest peak Solunska Glava in the middle

== See also ==
- List of mountains in North Macedonia
- List of European ultra-prominent peaks
