= Sveta Petka, Sopište =

Sveta Petka Света Петка Satapetkë
- Location within North Macedonia
- Coordinates: 41°56′N 21°20′E
- Country: North Macedonia
- Region: Skopje
- Municipality: Sopište

Population (2002)
  - Total: 712
- Time zone: UTC+1 (CET)
  - Summer (DST): UTC+2 (CEST)
- Car plates: SK
- Website: .

Sveta Petka (Macedonian: Света Петка, Albanian: Satapetkë) is a village in the municipality of Sopište, North Macedonia.

== Demographics ==
According to the 2002 census, the village had a total of 712 inhabitants. Ethnic Albanians constitute the overwhelming majority of the village population, as all but 11 residents belong to that ethnic group.

== Buildings ==
The village church in Sveta Petka was constructed from 1855 to 1858. Its carved wooden iconostasis, crafted by artists Veno and Zafir in 1868, is a notable feature. The church interior includes wall paintings completed in 1886 by Dimitrije Andonov and Petar Nikolic, with additional decorative work added by an unknown artist in 1902.

== Rockfall hazard and safety measures ==
The access road to the Sveta Petka dam presents a significant rockfall hazard, primarily due to steep rock cuts made in marble limestone combined with intense tectonic activity in the area. These geological conditions frequently cause rock movements and rockfalls onto the road, endangering vehicles and construction workers. An analysis conducted using the Rockfall Hazard Rating System (RHRS) identified multiple sections along the road that require urgent remedial measures. The study revealed that reducing the speed limit could substantially influence the hazard level, indicating that slower traffic speeds correlate with an increased risk of rockfall accidents. Suggested protective measures include removing unstable rock blocks, installing rockfall barriers and anchors, reinforcing slopes with shotcrete, and constructing concrete galleries or supports in the most hazardous zones. Ongoing monitoring through an annual stabilization program was recommended to maintain road safety effectively.
