= Dobry (disambiguation) =

Dobry is a book by Monica Shannon first published in 1934.

Dobry (masculine), Dobraya (feminine), or Dobroye (neuter) may also refer to:

Surname

- Karel Dobrý (born 1969), Czech film, television and stage actor
- Pavel Dobrý (born 1976), Czech footballer

Places

- Dobry, Poland, a village in Warmian-Masurian Voivodeship, Poland
- Dobry, Russia (Dobraya, Dobroye), name of several rural localities in Russia

Other

- Dobry, a musical jazz piece on the 2009 album Coincidence by Jaroslav Jakubovič
