= Matanzas oil storage facility explosion =

2022 oil explosion in Matanzas, Cuba

- Time: 5 August 2022
- Duration: Extinguished itself
- Location: Matanzas, Cuba; 23°04′28″N 81°32′16″W
- Type: Oil storage explosion
- Cause: Lightning strike
- Deaths: 17 Firefighters
- Injuries: 80–125
- Missing: 17
- Property damage: Unknown

The Matanzas oil storage facility explosion was an explosion on 5 August 2022 of an oil storage facility in Matanzas, Cuba. It resulted in the death of at least one person, injuring 80 to 125 others, and leaving 17 firefighters missing. The explosion forced the evacuation of 4,900 people from the city, shut the local thermal power station, and sparked fears of an energy crisis in the country.

== Explosion ==
The explosion took place on the night of 5 August during a thunderstorm. Lightning struck a fuel tank, causing an explosion. Black smoke from the ensuing fire spread up to 100 kilometers (62 miles) towards Cuba's capital city of Havana. Subsequent to the first explosion, the fire spread to several other fuel tanks at the facility, destroying significant amounts of fuel. The first tank was at 50%, containing 25,000 cubic meters (883,000 cubic feet) of fuel while the second was full. The injured were hospitalized with five people in critical condition and 20 remained hospitalized.

During the weekend, firefighters sprayed water on the remaining 10 fuel tanks to keep them cool and prevent the spread of the fire. Local officials warned residents to wear facemasks and stay indoors to avoid the sulfur dioxide smoke. The smoke also contained nitrogen oxide, carbon monoxide and other poisonous substances with the risk of acid rain. Five days after the fire started, the fires had been mostly brought under control with grey smoke mostly replacing the original black plumes.

== International aid ==
The countries of Mexico and Venezuela aided Cuba during the event by sending 100 firefighters, firefighting equipment, and two fireboats from both countries. Venezuela sent 85 volunteers and 20 tons of foam and chemicals. China sent aid with rescue and recovery operations. At least one senior Cuban government official showed frustration due to the lack of United States help. The United States had offered Cuba technical support, but as of early August no material had arrived. Cuban officials were glad to have technical advice on social media but at the same time consistently pointed out how little they received from the US. A United States Department of State spokesperson later stated that they had a general discussion on the event, but that the Cuban government had not formally requested U.S. government aid. A high-ranking Cuban official made urgent calls to the international community for help. In Miami, several activists asked the U.S. Department of State to do more to assist.
