= Jabolci =

Jabolci Јаболци Jabollcë
- Village
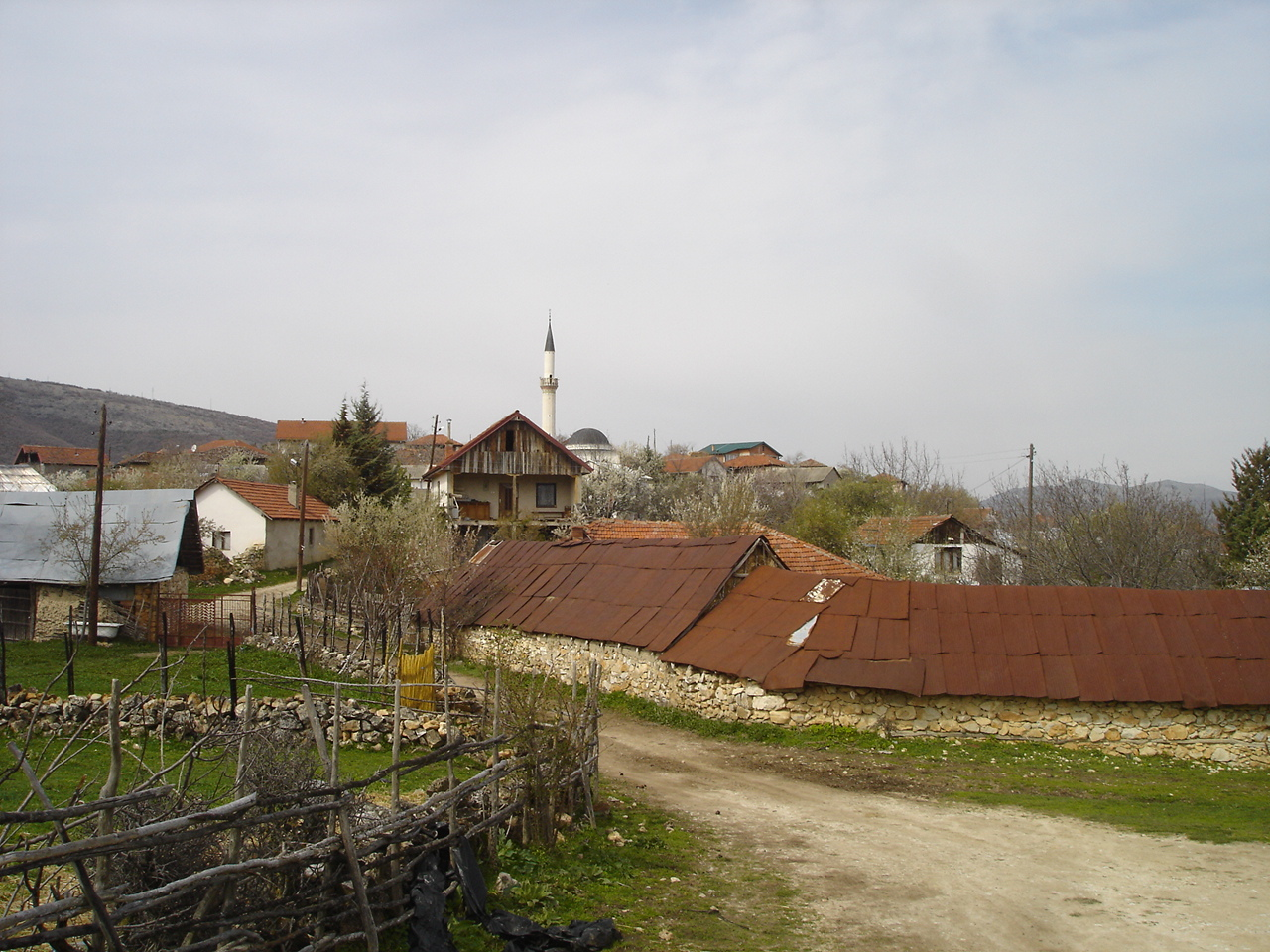
- Street in the village of Jabolci

- Location within North Macedonia
- Coordinates: 41°54′N 21°20′E
- Country: North Macedonia
- Region: Skopje
- Municipality: Sopište

Population (2002)
  - Total: 56
- Time zone: UTC+1 (CET)
  - Summer (DST): UTC+2 (CEST)
- Car plates: SK
- Website: .

Jabolci (Macedonian: Јаболци, Albanian: Jabollcë) is a village in the municipality of Sopište, North Macedonia.

== Demographics ==
In statistics gathered by Vasil Kanchov in 1900, the village was inhabited by 180 Muslim Albanians and 130 Bulgarian Exarchists.

On the 1927 ethnic map of Leonhard Schulze-Jena, Držilovo is shown as an Albanian village.

According to the 2002 census, the village had a total of 41 inhabitants. Ethnic groups in the village include:

- Macedonians 26
- Albanians 15

As of the 2021 census, Jabolci had 18 residents with the following ethnic composition:

- Macedonians 4
- Serbs 1
- Albanians 5
- Unknown 1
- Persons for whom data was taken from administrative sources 7
