= Sopište =

Sopište Сопиште
- municipality
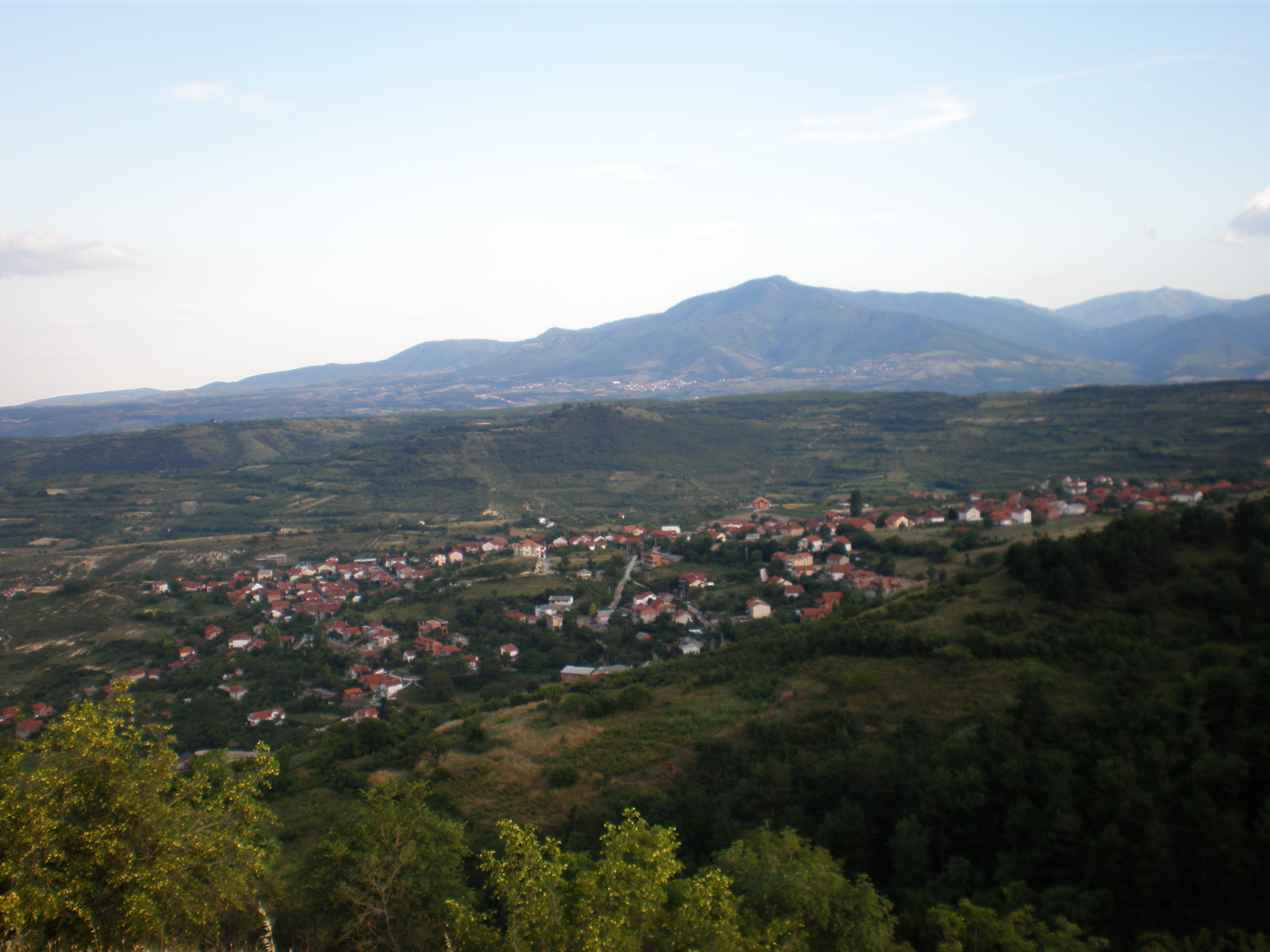
- Sopište

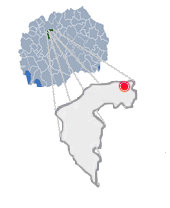

- Location within North Macedonia
- Country: North Macedonia
- Region: Skopje
- Municipality: Sopište

Population (2002)
  - Total: 5,325
- Time zone: UTC+1 (CET)
  - Summer (DST): UTC+2 (CEST)
- Vehicle registration: SK
- Website: .

Sopište (Macedonian: Сопиште) is a municipality in and the seat of the municipality of Sopište, North Macedonia.

== Demographics ==
According to the 2002 census, the village had a total of 5,325 inhabitants. Ethnic groups in the village include:

- Macedonians 5,255
- Turks 1
- Serbs 39
- Aromanians 11
- Others 19
