= Dobrodol =

Dobrodol may refer to:

- Dobrodol (Irig), a village in Syrmia, Serbia
- Dobrodol, Croatia, a village near Zagreb, Croatia

== See also ==
- Dobri Do (disambiguation)
- Dobri dol (disambiguation)
