= Lightning strike =

Electric discharge between the atmosphere and the ground

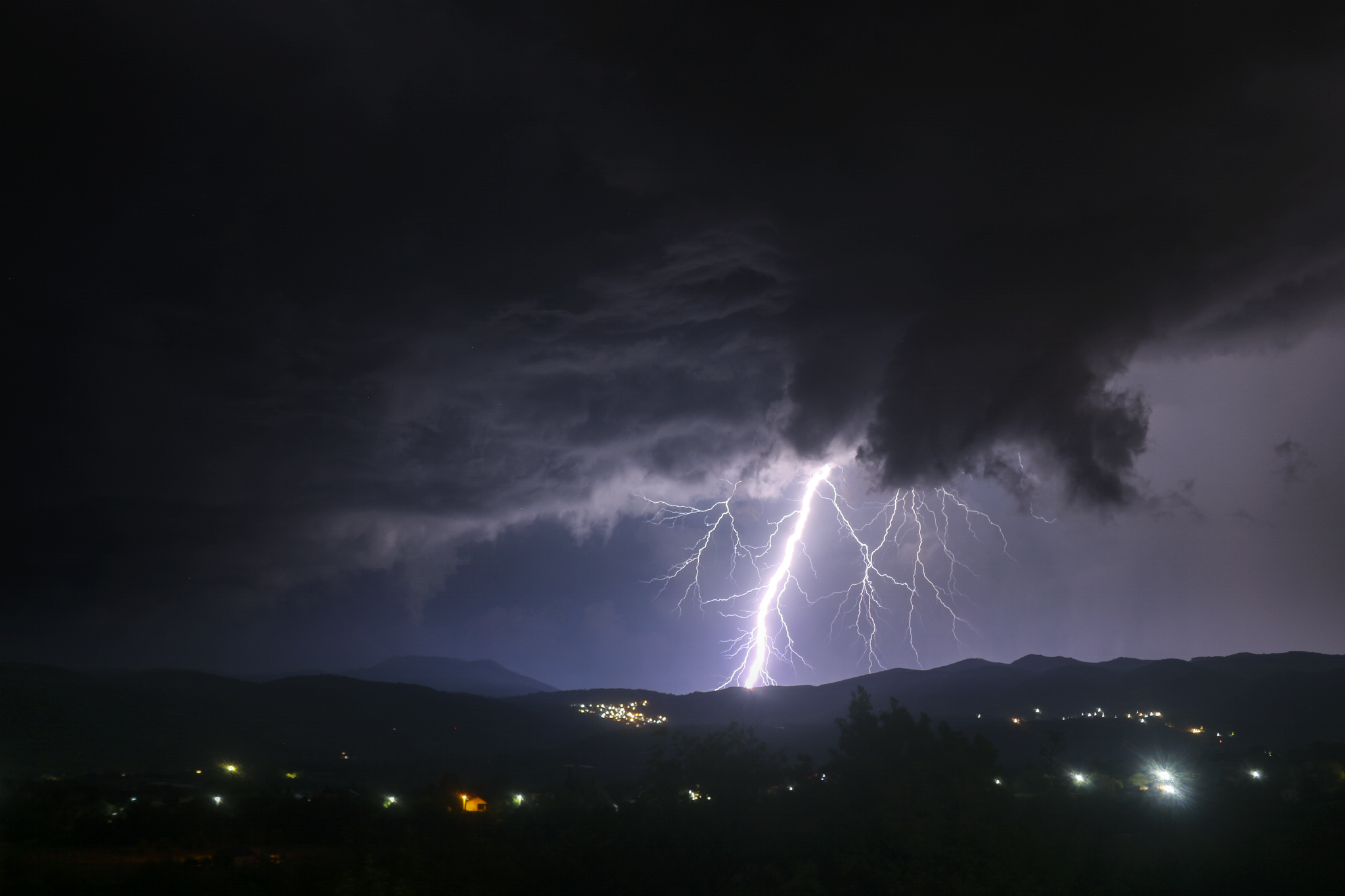
A lightning strike as seen from the village of Dolno Sonje, in a rural area south of Skopje, North Macedonia

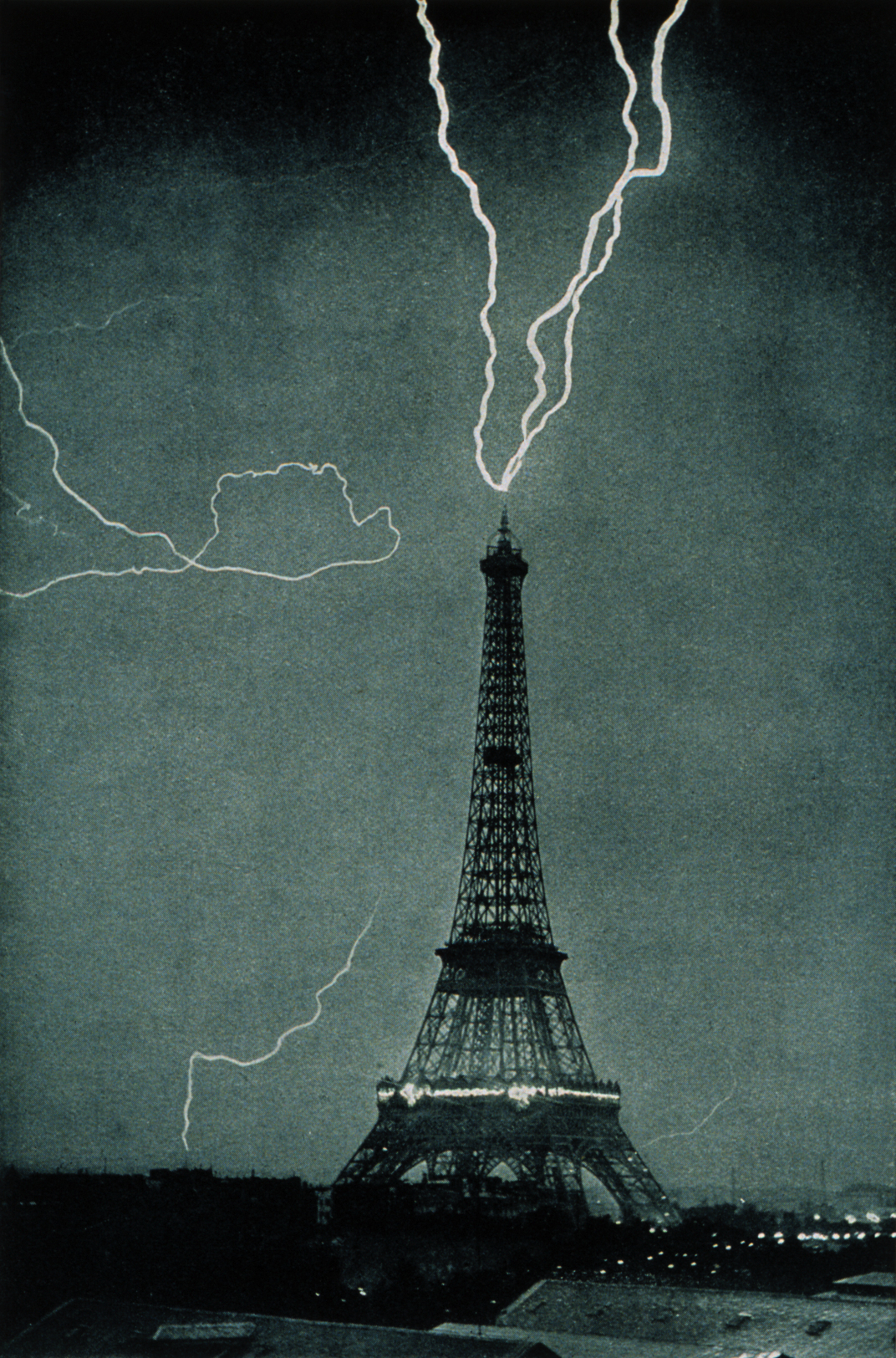
Lightning striking the Eiffel Tower in 1902. The metal tower acts as a colossal lightning conductor. The presence of multiple bolts shows this is a time-exposure photograph.

A lightning strike or lightning bolt is a lightning event in which an electric discharge takes place between the atmosphere and the ground. Most originate in a cumulonimbus cloud and terminate on the ground, called cloud-to-ground (CG) lightning. A less common type of strike, ground-to-cloud (GC) lightning, is upward-propagating lightning initiated from a tall grounded object and reaching into the clouds. About 25% of all lightning events worldwide are strikes between the atmosphere and earth-bound objects. Most are intracloud (IC) lightning and cloud-to-cloud (CC), where discharges only occur high in the atmosphere. Lightning strikes the average commercial aircraft at least once a year, but modern engineering and design means this is rarely a problem. The movement of aircraft through clouds can even cause lightning strikes.

== Epidemiology ==
Lightning strikes can injure humans in several different ways:

1. Direct
  - Direct strike – the person is part of a flash channel. Enormous quantities of energy pass through the body very quickly, resulting in internal burns, organ damage, explosions of flesh and bone, and nervous system damage. Depending on the flash strength and access to medical services, it may be instantaneously fatal or cause permanent injury and impairment.
  - Contact injury – an object (generally a conductor) that a person is touching is electrified by a strike.
  - Side splash – branches of currents "jumping" from the primary flash channel electrify the person.
  - Blast injuries – being thrown and suffering blunt-force trauma from the shock wave (if very close) and possible hearing damage from the thunder.
2. Indirect
  - Ground current or "step potential" – Earth surface charges race towards the flash channel during discharge. Because the ground has high impedance, the current "chooses" a better conductor, often a person's legs, passing through the body. The near-instantaneous rate of discharge causes a potential (difference) over distance, which may amount to several thousand volts per linear foot. This phenomenon (also responsible for reports of mass reindeer deaths due to lightning storms) leads to more injuries and deaths than all direct strike effects combined.
  - EMPs – the discharge process produces an electromagnetic pulse (EMP), which may damage an artificial pacemaker, or otherwise affect normal biological processes.
  - Visual artefacts may be induced in the retinas of people located within 200 m (650 ft) of a severe lightning storm.
3. Secondary or resultant:
  - Explosions, fires, accidents.

Warning signs of an impending strike nearby can include a crackling sound, sensations of static electricity in the hair or skin, the pungent smell of ozone, or the appearance of a blue haze around persons or objects (St. Elmo's fire). People caught in such extreme situations—without having been able to flee to a safer, fully enclosed space—are advised to assume the "lightning position", which involves "sitting or crouching with knees and feet close together to create only one point of contact with the ground" (with the feet off the ground if sitting; if a standing position is needed, the feet must be touching).

Lightning strikes can produce severe injuries in humans, and are lethal in 10–30% of cases, with up to 80% of survivors sustaining long-term injuries. These severe injuries are not usually caused by thermal burns, since the current is too brief to greatly heat up tissues; instead, nerves and muscles may be directly damaged by the high voltage producing holes in their cell membranes, a process called electroporation. Metallic objects in contact with the skin may "concentrate" the lightning's energy, given it is a better natural conductor and the preferred pathway, resulting in more serious injuries, such as burns from molten or evaporating metal. At least two cases have been reported where a strike victim wearing an iPod suffered more serious injuries as a result.

During a flash, though, the current flowing through the channel and around the body can generate large electromagnetic fields and EMPs, which may induce electrical transients (surges) within the nervous system or pacemaker of the heart, upsetting normal operations. This effect might explain cases where cardiac arrest or seizures followed a lightning strike that produced no external injuries. It may also point to the victim not being directly struck at all, but just being very close to the strike termination.

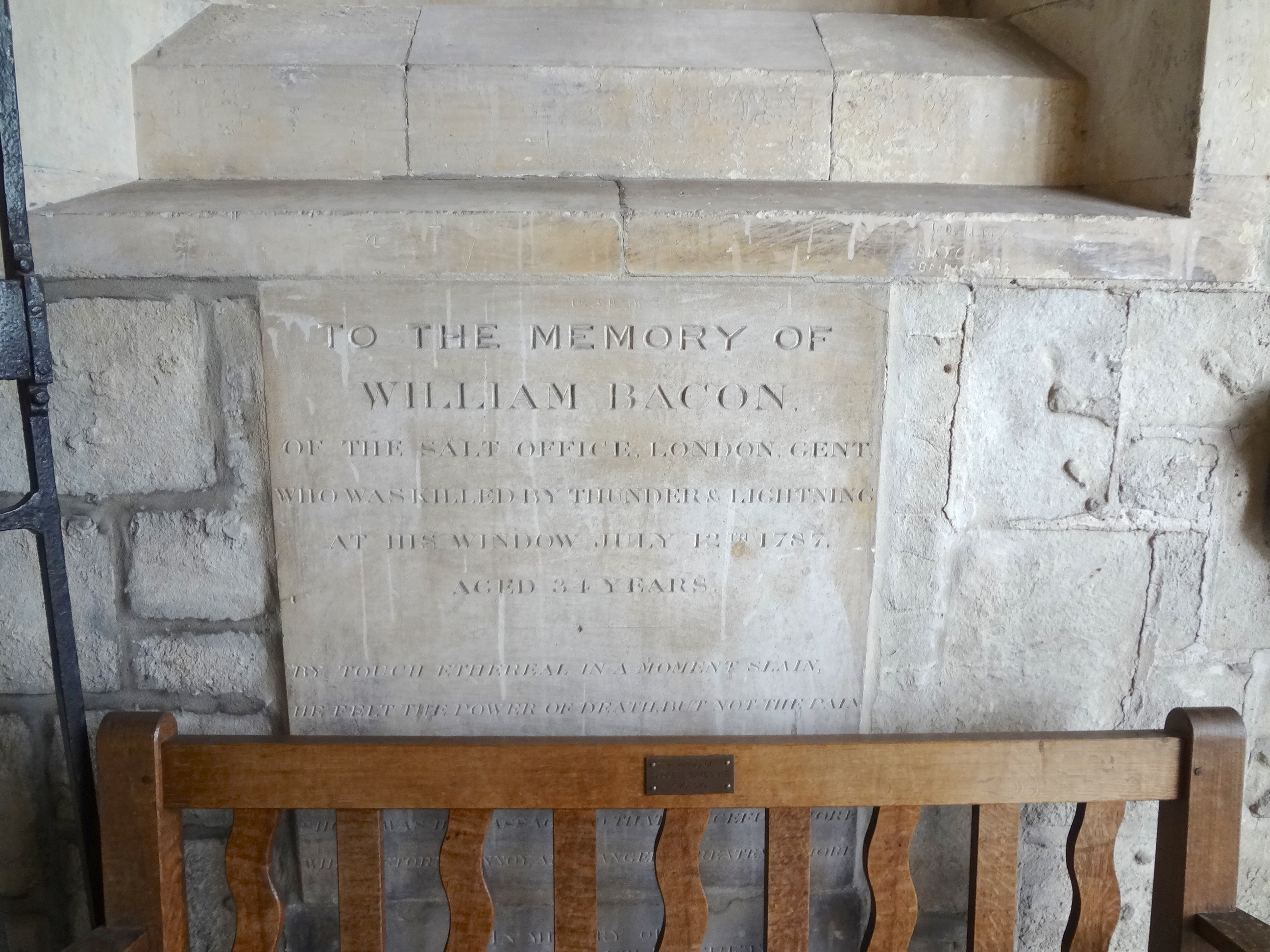
Memorial to a man killed by lightning in London, 1787

According to the CDC there are about 6,000 lightning strikes per minute, or more than 8 million strikes every day. As of 2008 there were about 240,000 "lightning strikes incidents" around the world each year.

According to the National Oceanic and Atmospheric Administration in 2012, over the twenty years to 2012 the United States averaged 51 annual lightning strike fatalities, making it the second-most frequent cause of weather-related death after floods. In the US, as of 1999, between 9 and 10% of those struck died, with an annual average of 25 deaths in the 2010s decade (16 in 2017).

In the United States in the period 2009 to 2018 an average of 27 lightning fatalities occurred per year. In the United States an average of 23 people died from lightning per year from 2012 to 2021. Some people suffer from lifelong brain injuries.

As of 2005, in Kisii, Kenya, some 30 people die each year from lightning strikes. Kisii's high rate of lightning fatalities occurs because of the frequency of thunderstorms and because many of the area's structures have metal roofs. As of 2013, direct-strike casualties could be much higher than reported numbers. In 2015 it was reported that between five and ten deaths from lightning occur in Australia every year with over 100 injuries occurring.

In 2018, it was reported that "a direct strike accounts for only 3 to 5 percent of all injuries and death, while ground currents, which spread out over the ground after lightning strikes, account for up to 50 per cent... ...Where the lightning strikes the ground, the ground becomes highly electrified and if you're within that area of ground electrification..." you can receive an electrical shock from the lightning.

In 2021, one report wrote that "30–60 people are struck by lightning each year in Britain, and on average, 3 (5–10%) of these strikes are fatal." It also estimated that "...one in four people struck by lightning were sheltering under trees."

== Effect on animals ==
Lightning strikes are a threat to animals. They are most studied as a threat to livestock used in human ranching and agriculture. In particular, large quadrupeds such as cattle, sheep, and horses are at particular risk to the electricity from a lightning strike. A few unlucky ones are struck directly by lightning or by side flashes, but there is a larger danger: step potential and step voltage. When a huge amount of electricity goes to ground, such as during a lightning strike, there can become a step voltage difference between multiple points of contact with the ground. This difference creates a path for the current to pass through an entity standing on the affected ground. Bipeds such as humans are less likely to fall victim to this, as their two feet are comparatively close together, reducing the voltage difference. If some current goes through them, it may be largely through non-lethal areas such as the legs. Quadrupeds are not so lucky. The large distance between their front legs and back legs invite the surging electricity to path through one set of legs, through their body, and out the other set of legs. Further, this electricity will go through critical organs in their heart and nervous system more easily than for humans, killing them. This can result in simultaneous mass kills of livestock that crowded near a tree from the current in the ground itself. This situation is worsened as trees provide shade from the heat and partial shelter from the rain, and thus attract livestock to congregate nearby. But trees also attract lightning strikes due to being a local high point.

Similarly, a metal or wire fence struck by lightning is also a danger. Livestock that don't seek shelter under trees are reported to sometimes gather at the periphery of a property as if trying to get away from a storm, which can result in groups of livestock all in contact with a fence. To mitigate these risks, farmers and ranchers using wire fences are encouraged to stick ground rods every so often along them. Otherwise, a lightning strike can easily travel down a fence and electrocute livestock touching any section of it. They are also encouraged to discourage livestock from lone trees on hilltops, which can attract both a herd of nervous livestock while being a prime danger area for lightning strikes in a storm. If deterrence with a wooden fence or the like is not feasible or desirable (such as for trees intended to provide such shade in hot climates), covering the surface near the at-risk tree with gravel or a similarly non-conductive insulating material is recommended. For even further protection, the tree can have metal wire wrapped around the trunk, connected with vertical wire that goes beneath the surface and spreads radially from the tree. This would attempt to provide a low-resistance path to guide the electric current farther away and deeper underground during a strike.

Deaths by lightning to large livestock don't leave obvious marks as to the cause to an untrained eye; afflicted cattle appear to have simply fallen over. This lack of obvious sign means that farmers sometimes incorrectly classify livestock death as due to lightning, or possibly dishonestly attempt to pass off deaths due to negligence as lightning deaths as a form of insurance fraud. One study of cattle deaths claimed to be the result of lightning in Belgium found that only around half of the deaths claimed to be due to lightning were verified by expert veterinary analysis. Still, making a conclusive determination of cause of death can be difficult even for forensic investigators who know what to look for.

The effect of lightning on wild animals is poorly documented and not closely tracked, but seem to be a risk to wild quadrupeds for similar reasons as livestock from the cases that are known. One mass mortality incident in Norway saw 323 wild reindeer killed by lightning.

== Effect on nature ==
=== Impact on vegetation ===
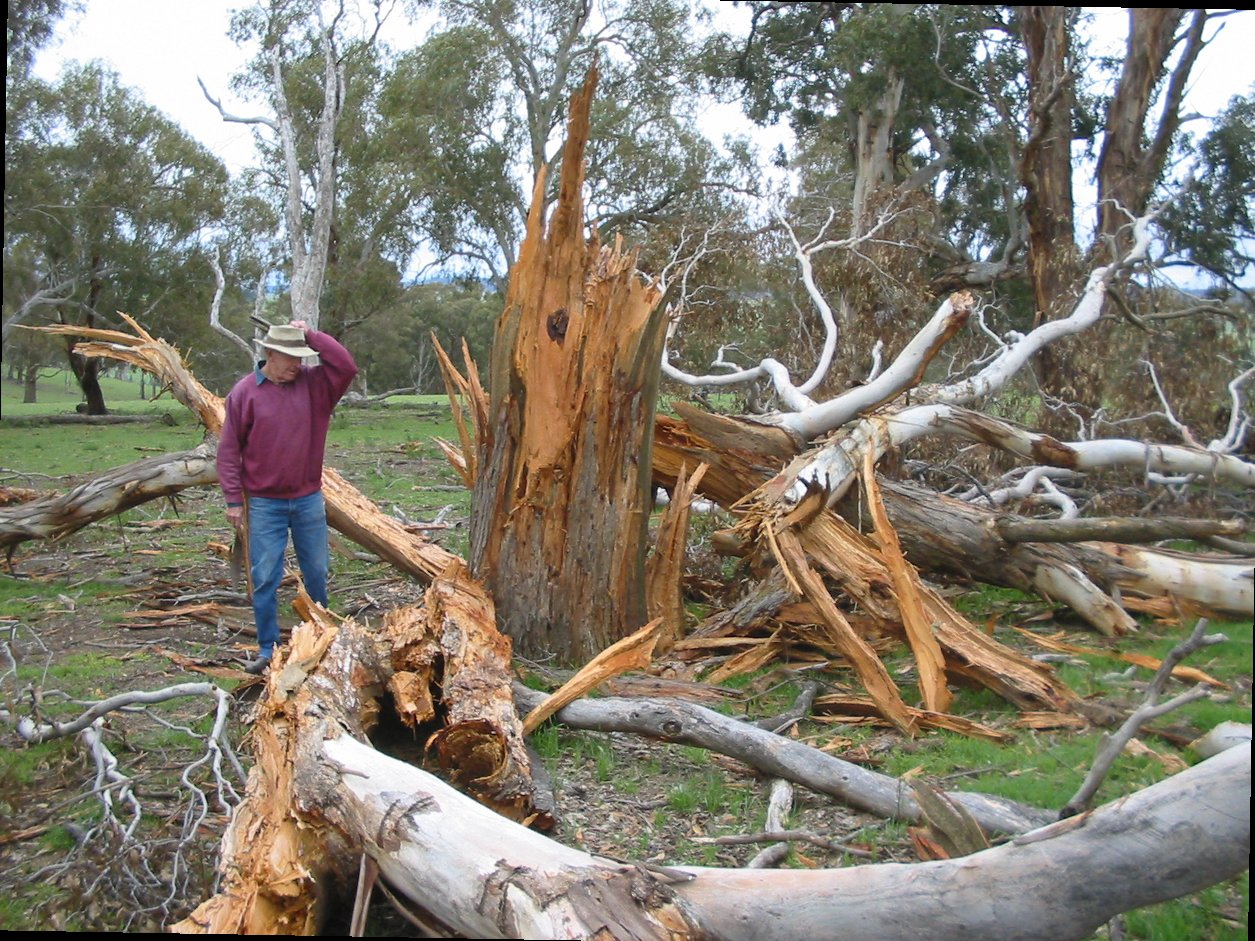
A tree exploded when struck by lightning.

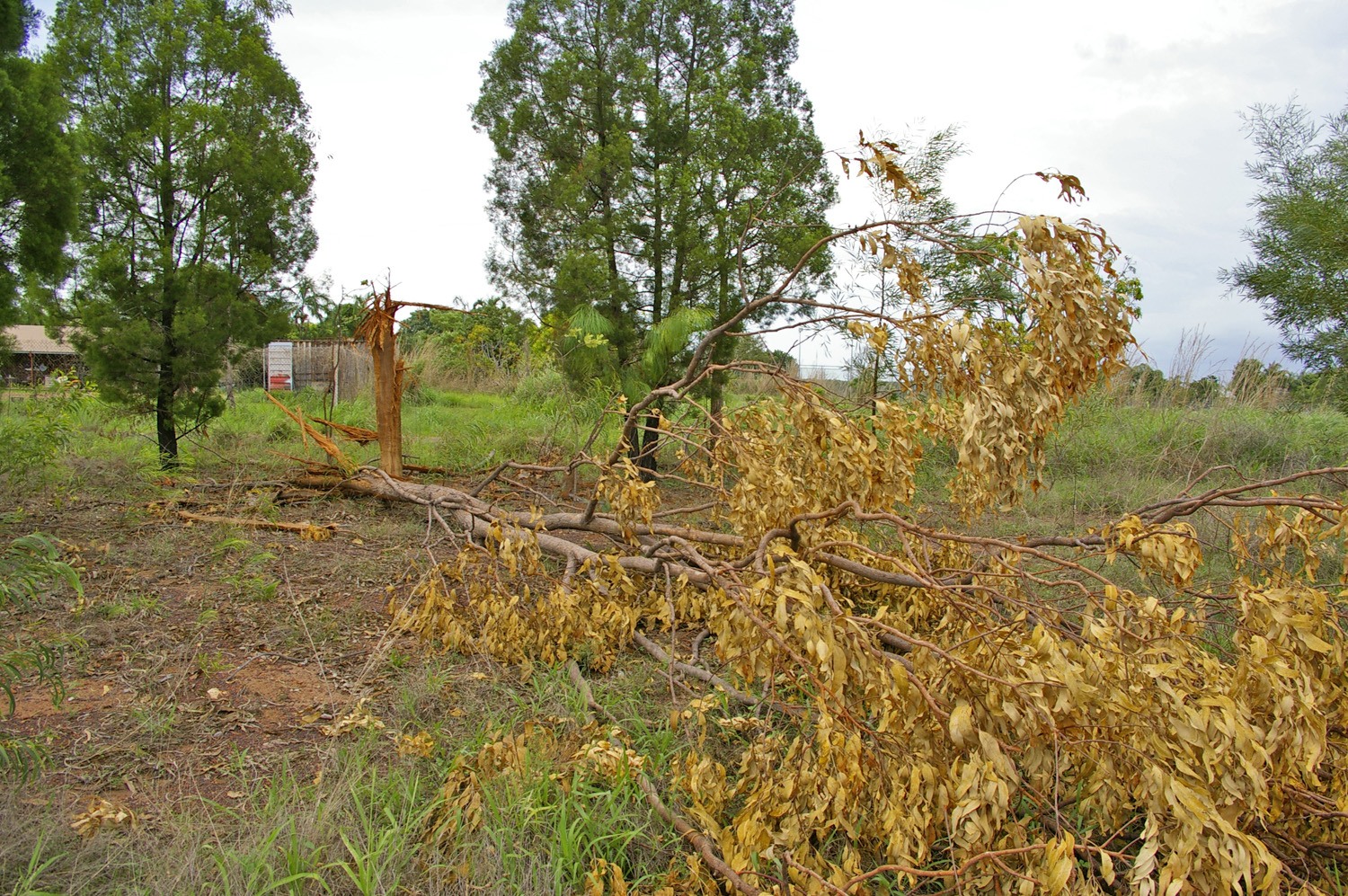
This eucalyptus tree was struck by lightning, while two nearby conifers were untouched, Darwin, Northern Territory, Australia.

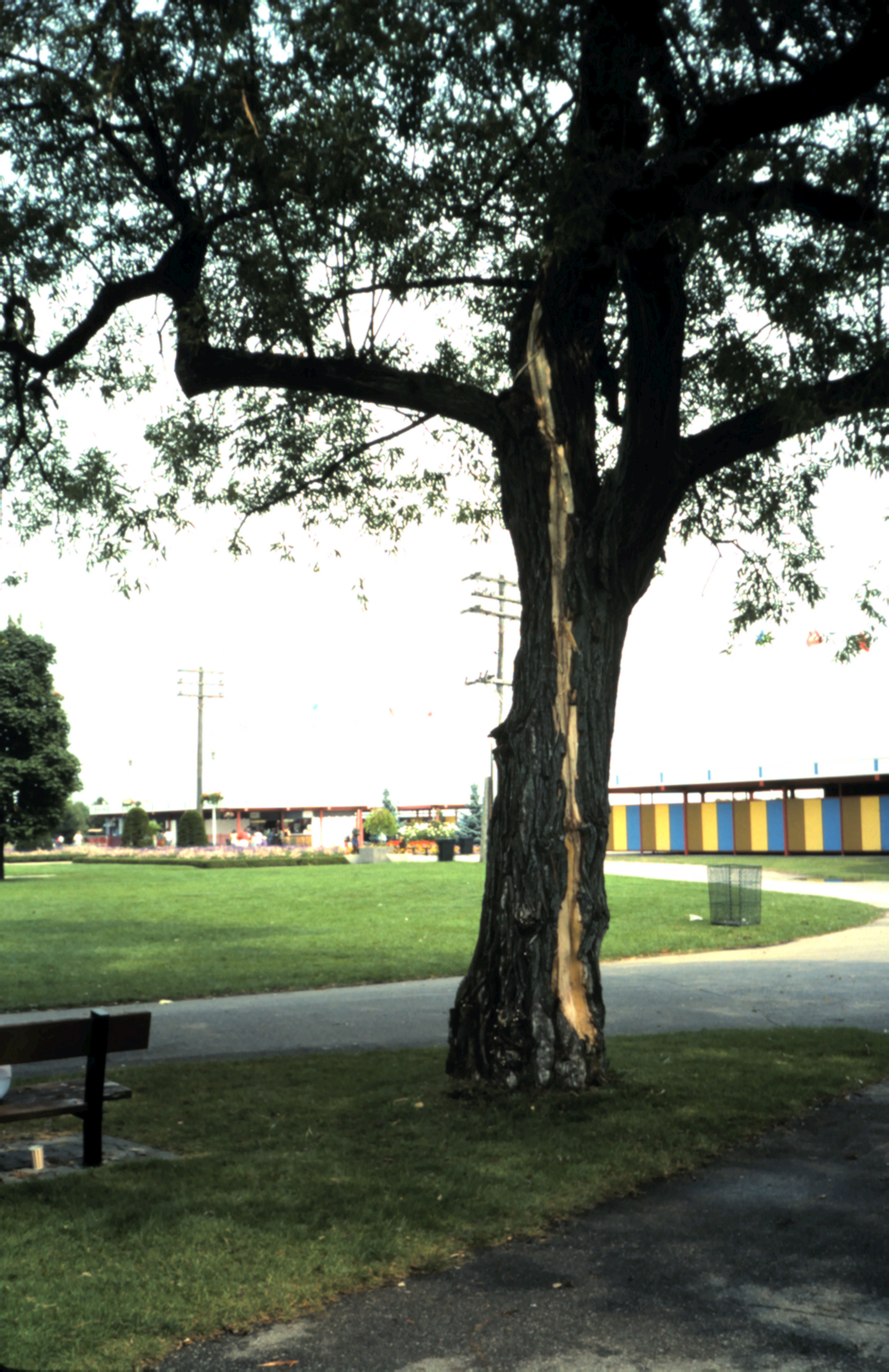
A lightning-struck tree in the Toronto Islands, clearly shows the path that the charge took into the ground.

In sparsely populated areas such as the Russian Far East and Siberia, lightning strikes are one of the major causes of forest fires. The smoke and mist expelled by a very large forest fire can cause secondary lightning strikes, starting additional fires many kilometers downwind.

=== Shattering of rocks ===
When water in fractured rock is rapidly heated by a lightning strike, the resulting steam explosion can cause rock disintegration and shift boulders. It may be a significant factor in erosion of tropical and subtropical mountains that have never been glaciated. Evidence of lightning strikes includes erratic magnetic fields.

== Electrical and structural damage ==
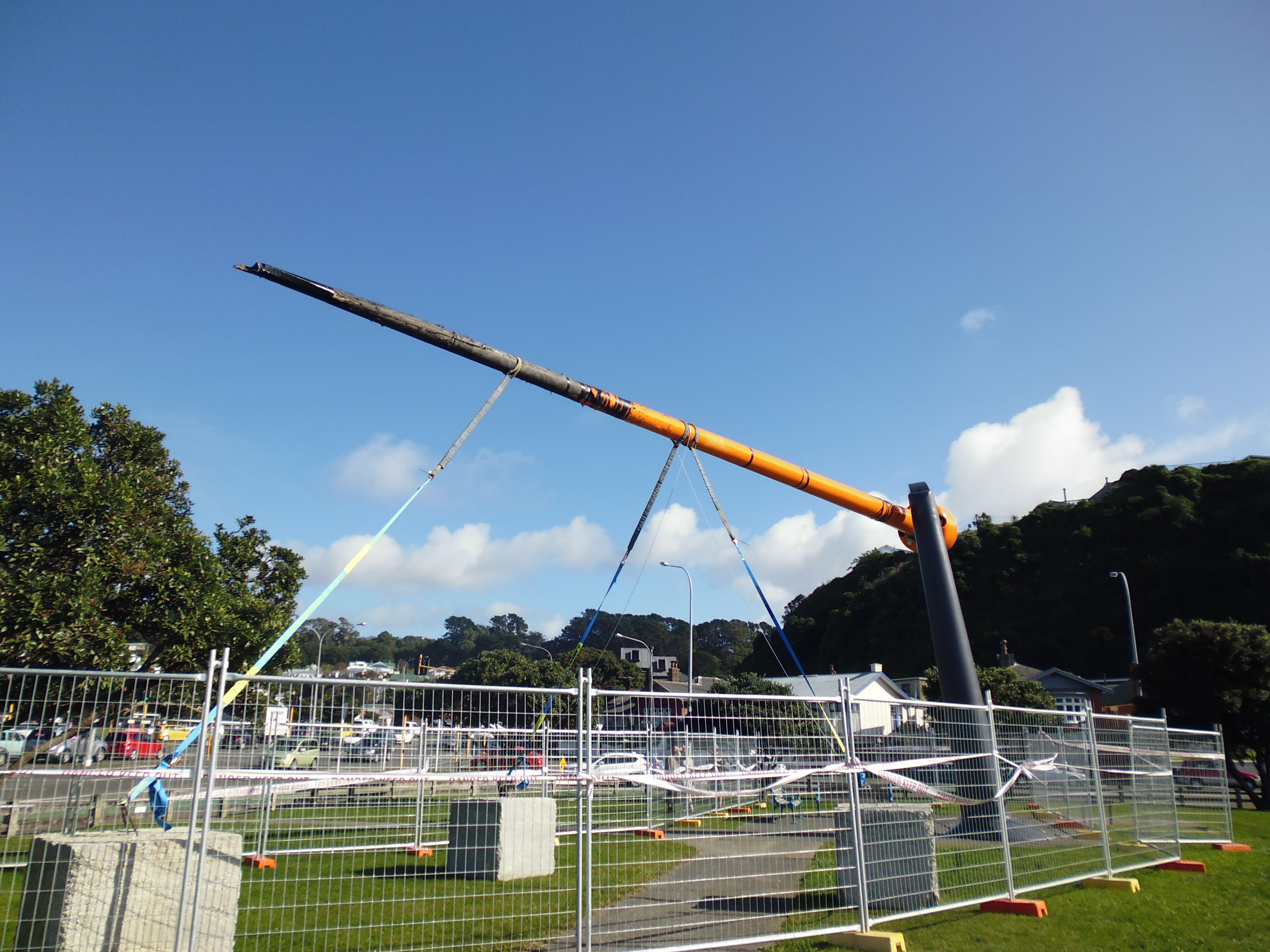
The Zephyrometer sculpture in Wellington, New Zealand, damaged by lightning

Telephones, modems, computers, and other electronic devices can be damaged by lightning, as harmful overcurrent can reach them through the phone jack, Ethernet cable, or electricity outlet.

Lightning currents have a very fast rise time, on the order of 40 kA per microsecond. Hence, although lightning is a form of direct current, conductors of such currents exhibit marked skin effect as with an alternating current, causing most of the currents to flow through the outer surface of the conductor.

== Prevention and mitigations ==
=== Protection systems ===
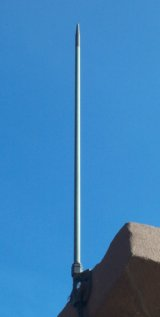
An example of a standard, pointed-tip, air terminal

Hundreds of devices, including lightning rods and charge transfer systems, are used to mitigate lightning damage and influence the path of a lightning flash.

A lightning rod (or lightning protector) is a metal strip or rod connected to earth through conductors and a grounding system, used to provide a preferred pathway to ground if lightning terminates on a structure. The class of these products is often called a "finial" or "air terminal". A lightning rod or "Franklin rod" in honor of its famous inventor, Benjamin Franklin, is simply a metal rod, and without being connected to the lightning protection system, as was sometimes the case in the past, will provide no added protection to a structure. Other names include "lightning conductor", "arrester", and "discharger"; however, over the years these names have been incorporated into other products or industries with a stake in lightning protection. Lightning arrester, for example, often refers to fused links that explode when a strike occurs to a high-voltage overhead power line to protect the more expensive transformers down the line by opening the circuit. In reality, it was an early form of a heavy duty surge-protection device. Modern arresters, constructed with metal oxides, are capable of safely shunting abnormally high voltage surges to ground while preventing normal system voltages from being shorted to ground.

=== Monitoring and warning systems ===
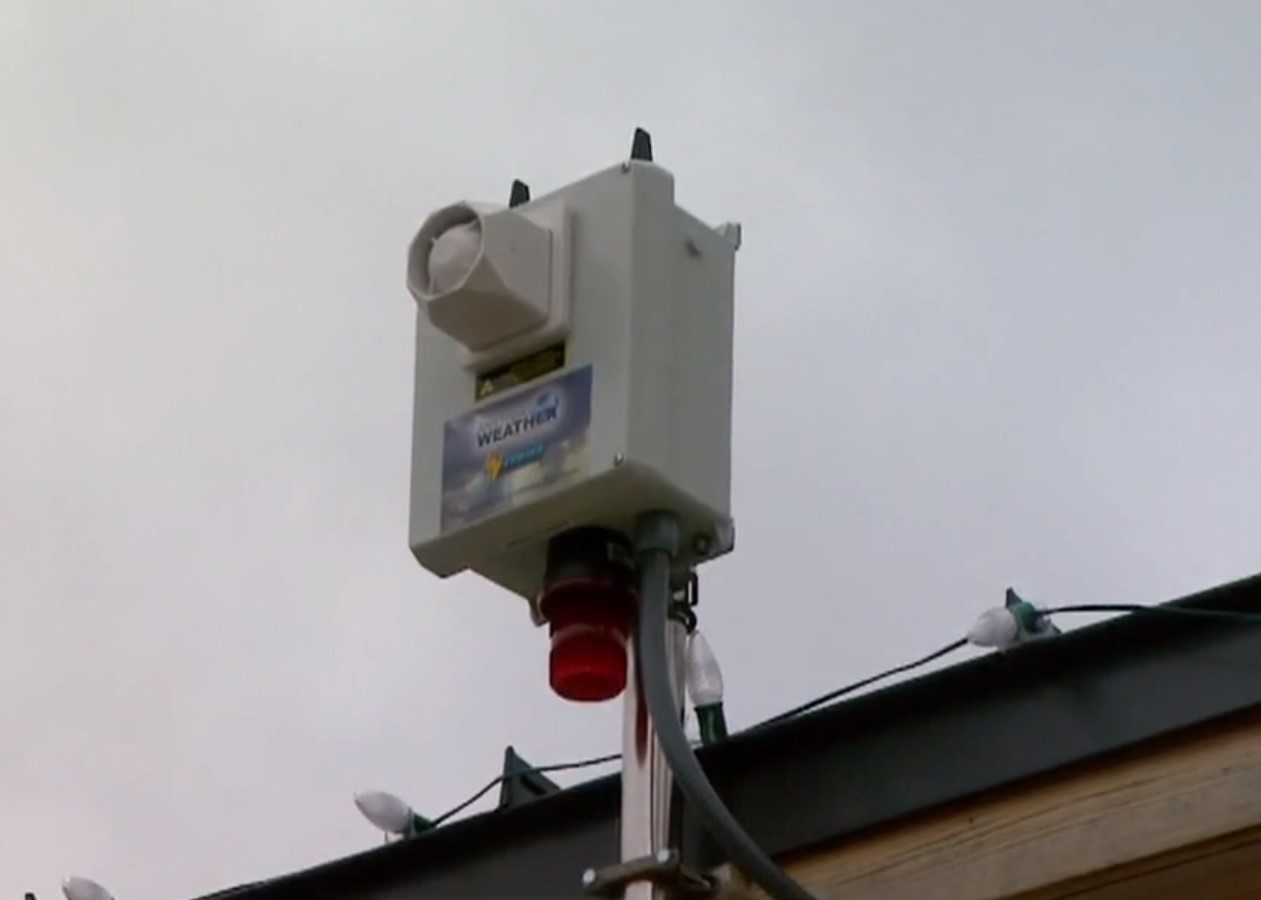
Lightning siren system with strobe

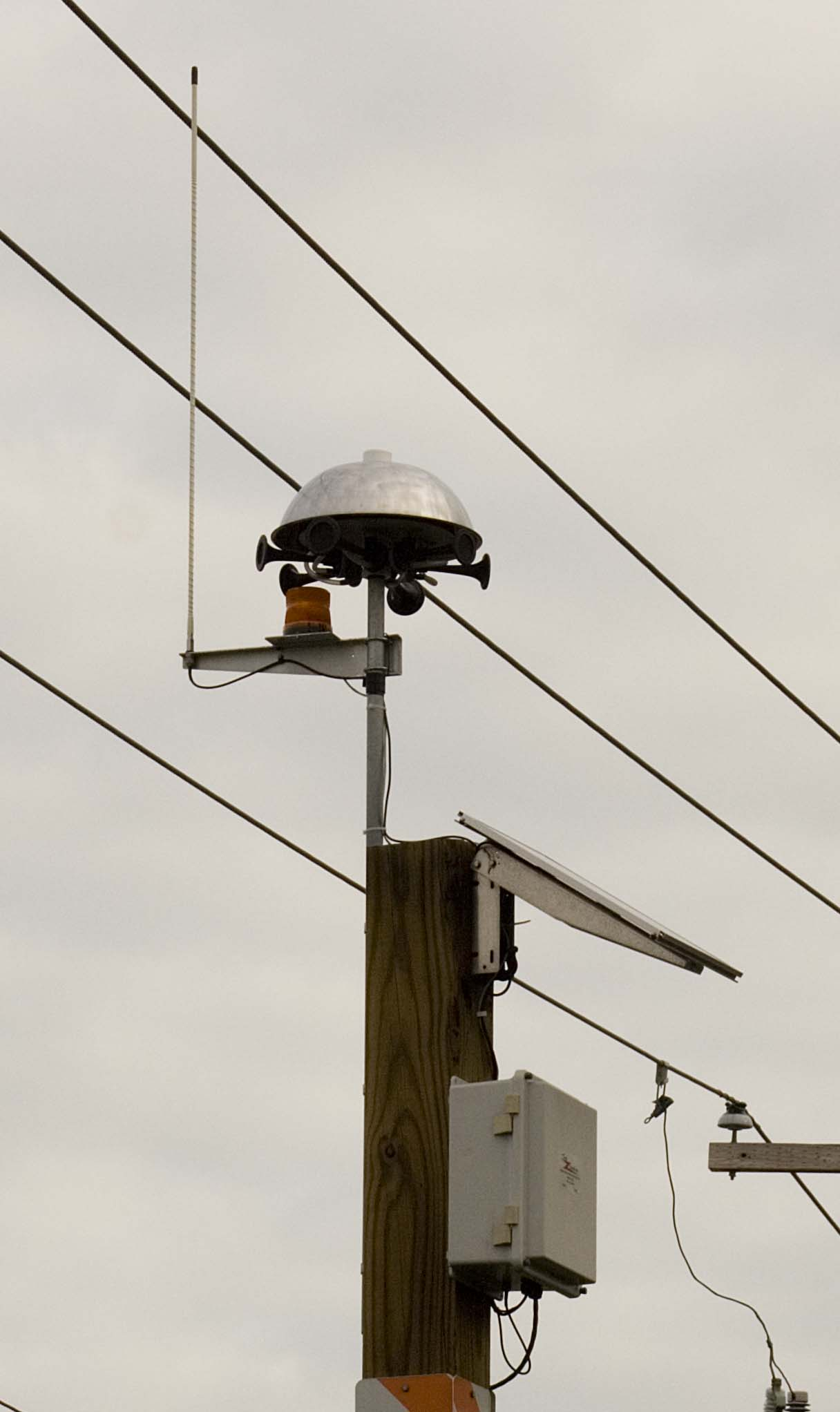
A lightning prediction system

The exact location of a lightning strike and when it will occur are still impossible to predict. However, products and systems have been designed of varying complexities to alert people as the probability of a strike increases above a set level determined by a risk assessment for the location's conditions and circumstances. One significant improvement has been in the area of detection of flashes through both ground- and satellite-based observation devices. The strikes and atmospheric flashes are not predicted, but the level of detail recorded by these technologies has vastly improved in the past 20 years.

Although commonly associated with thunderstorms at close range, lightning strikes can occur on a day that seems devoid of clouds. This occurrence is known as "a bolt from the blue [sky]".

Lightning interferes with amplitude modulation (AM) radio signals much more than frequency modulation (FM) signals, providing an easy way to gauge local lightning strike intensity.

=== Personal safety ===
The U.S. National Lightning Safety Institute advises American citizens to have a plan for their safety when a thunderstorm occurs and to commence it as soon as the first lightning is seen or thunder heard. This is important, as lightning can strike without rain actually falling and a storm being overhead, contrary to popular belief. If thunder can be heard at all, then a risk of lightning exists.

The National Lightning Safety Institute also recommends using the F-B (flash to boom) method to gauge distance to a lightning strike. The flash of a lightning strike and resulting thunder occur at roughly the same time. But light travels 300,000 km/sec, almost a million times the speed of sound. Sound travels at the slower speed of about 340 m/sec (depending on the temperature), so the flash of lightning is seen before thunder is heard. A method to determine the distance between lightning strike and viewer involves counting the seconds between the lightning flash and thunder. Then, dividing by three to determine the distance in kilometers, or by five for miles. Immediate precautions against lightning should be taken if the F-B time is 25 seconds or less, that is, if the lightning is closer than 8 km or 5 miles.

A 2014 report suggested that whether a person was standing up, squatting, or lying down when outside during a thunderstorm does not matter, because lightning can travel along the ground; this report suggested being inside a solid structure or vehicle was safest. The riskiest activities include fishing, boating, camping, and golf. A person injured by lightning does not carry an electrical charge, and can be safely handled to apply first aid before emergency services arrive. Lightning can affect the brainstem, which controls breathing.

Several studies conducted in South Asia and Africa suggest that the dangers of lightning are not taken sufficiently seriously there. A research team from the University of Colombo found that even in neighborhoods that had experienced deaths from lightning, no precautions were taken against future storms. An expert forum convened in 2007 to address how to raise awareness of lightning and improve lightning-protection standards, and expressed concern that many countries had no official standards for the installation of lightning rods.

Safety measures

- Do not be next to a high object such as a tree or near metal objects like poles and fences.
- Do not take shelter in car ports, open garages, covered patios, picnic shelters, beach pavilions, tents, sheds, greenhouses, golf shelters and baseball dugouts.
- Take shelter in a building or a vehicle. It was reported that "The steel frame of a hard topped vehicle can protect you from lightning..." and to "avoid using electronic equipment inside the car and avoid touching anything metal."
- If inside a building, avoid electrical equipment and plumbing including taking a shower.
- Risk remains for up to 30 minutes after the last observed lightning or thunder.
- It has been reported that "If you are on water, get to the shore and off wide, open beaches as quickly as possible as water will transmit strikes from further away. Studies have shown that proximity to water is a common factor in lightning strikes."
- It has been reported that "If you do not have anywhere to go, then you should make for the lowest possible ground like a valley or ravine."
- Do not huddle up "...with other people in a group—spread out from your friends as much as you can."
- If your hair stands on end, lightning is about to strike you or in your vicinity. Get indoors as fast as possible. If not, drop to your knees and bend forward but don't lie flat on the ground. You may also feel a tingling sensation of static electricity on your skin.

== Notable incidents ==
=== Earth-bound ===
- 930 July 24:Lightning struck the Seiryōden—where Emperor Daigo was present—in Heian-kyō (Kyoto), Japan, killing seven people. Emperor Daigo passed away three months later.
- 1769: A particularly deadly lightning incident occurred in Brescia, Italy. Lightning struck the Church of St. Nazaire, igniting the 90 tonnes of gunpowder in its vaults; the resulting explosion killed up to 3,000 people and destroyed a sixth of the city.
- 1772 October 8: John Montagu reported that Captain William Maltby stationed at Virginia was struck by lightning aboard HMS Glasgow, disabling the Fore top gallant and top masts. Several people were reportedly knocked down but none killed or severely injured.
- 1893 June 21: During a severe thunderstorm, lightning struck the center pole in the menagerie of Ringling Bros. Circus in River Falls, Wisconsin, killing eight people instantly and injuring around 30 or 40 more, some of the latter succumbing to their wounds.
- 1901: 11 killed and one was paralyzed below the hips by a strike in Chicago.
- 1902: A lightning strike damaged the upper section of the Eiffel Tower, requiring the reconstruction of its top.
- 1916 June 9: At least one man named only as "Johnson" is killed following a lightning strike at his home near San Antonio, Texas.
- 1974 August 14: Eight-year-old Lisa Christina Hill died after being struck by lightning on Bethany Beach, Delaware. Her death inspired Katherine Paterson, whose son David was best friends with Hill, to write the novel Bridge to Terabithia.
- 1976 July 18: During a celebration, a sudden lightning strike killed 9 people at Alpe di Catenaia on the Apennine Mountains in Italy.
- 1980 June 30: A lightning incident killed 11 pupils in Biego primary school in Kenya in present-day Nyamira County. Another 50 pupils were injured, while others were left traumatized.
- 1994 November 2: A lightning incident led to the explosion of fuel tanks in Durunka, Egypt, causing 469 fatalities.
- 1998 October 28: A lightning strike at a football stadium in the Democratic Republic of the Congo killed 11 players.
- 2005 October 31: Sixty-eight dairy cows died on a farm at Fernbrook on the Waterfall Way near Dorrigo, New South Wales, after being involved in a lightning incident. Three others were temporarily paralyzed for several hours, later making a full recovery. The cows were sheltering near a tree when it was struck by lightning. Soil resistivity is generally higher than that of animal tissue. When immense amounts of energy are released into the soil, just the few meters up an animal's leg, through its body and down other legs can present a markedly reduced resistance to electrical current and a proportionally higher amount will flow through the animal than the soil on which it is standing. This phenomenon, called earth potential rise, can cause significant and damaging electrical shock, enough to kill large animals.
- 2007 July: A lightning incident killed up to 30 people when it struck Ushari Dara, a remote mountain village in northwestern Pakistan.
- 2008 October: 52 cattle were killed at a Uruguayan ranch in San José by a single strike. The cattle had all been touching the same fence during a storm.
- 2011 June 8: A lightning strike sent 77 Air Force cadets to the hospital when it struck in the middle of a training camp at Camp Shelby, Mississippi.
- 2013 February: Nine South African children were hospitalized after a lightning incident occurred on a cricket field at their school, injuring five children on the pitch and four girls who were walking home.
- 2016 May–June: Rock am Ring festival near Frankfurt was cancelled after at least 80 people were injured due to lightning in the area. Additionally, 11 children in France and three adults in Germany were injured and one man killed in southern Poland around the same dates.
- 2016 August 26: A herd of wild reindeer was struck on the Hardangervidda in central Norway, killing 323. Norwegian Environment Agency spokesman Kjartan Knutsen said it had never heard of such a death toll before. He said he did not know if multiple strikes occurred, but that they all died in "one moment".
- 2017: The first live recording of a lightning strike on a cardiac rhythm strip occurred in a teenaged male who had an implanted loop recorder as a cardiac monitor for neurocardiogenic syncope.
- 2018: A lightning strike killed at least 16 people and injured dozens more at a Seventh-Day Adventist church in Rwanda.
- 2021: A lightning strike killed a 9-year-old boy in a field in Blackpool, England.
- 2021: In April, at least 76 people across India were killed by lightning strike on a single weekend; 23 people died on the watchtower of Amer Fort, a popular tourist spot in Rajasthan, and 42 were killed in Uttar Pradesh with the highest toll of 14 happening in the city of Allahabad. Lastly, 11 were killed in Madhya Pradesh with two of them killed while sheltering under trees when they were tending sheep.
- 2021: On August 4, 17 people were killed by a single lightning strike in Shibganj Upazila of Chapainawabganj district in Bangladesh; 16 people died on the spot and the other one died by heart attack while seeing the others.
- 2022: On August 4, 3 people were killed and another person was injured after lightning struck a tree in Lafayette Square, Washington, D.C.
- 2022: On August 5, lightning struck a fuel tank at an oil storage facility in Matanzas, causing a fire and a series of explosions that resulted in at least one death and up to 125 injuries. In addition, 17 firefighters were reported missing.
- 2022: On August 18, a woman was killed and two people hospitalized after lightning struck a tree in Winter Springs, Florida.
- 2023: On September 18, a Mexican tourist and a local hamac salesman were struck and killed by a lightning bolt on a beach in Michoacán, Mexico.
- 2026: On January 25, 72 supporters of former Brazilian president Jair Bolsonaro were struck by lightning at a rally in Brasília, with 30 requiring hospitalization.
- 2026: Between 26 April and 2 May, at least 71 people were killed by lightning strikes in various parts of Bangladesh. Fifteen deaths were reported on a single day, April 26.

=== In-flight ===
Airplanes are commonly struck by lightning without damage, with the typical commercial aircraft hit at least once a year. Sometimes, though, the effects of a strike are serious.

- 1963 December 8: Pan Am Flight 214 crashed outside Elkton, Maryland, during a severe electrical storm, with a loss of all 81 passengers and crew. The Boeing 707-121, registered as N709PA, was on the final leg of a San Juan–Baltimore–Philadelphia flight.
- 1969 November 14: The Apollo 12 mission's Saturn V rocket and its ionized exhaust plume became part of a lightning flash channel 36.5 seconds after lift-off. Although the discharge occurred "through" the metal skin and framework of the vehicle, it did not ignite the rocket's highly combustible fuel.
- 1971 December 24: LANSA Flight 508, a Lockheed L-188A Electra turboprop, registered OB-R-941, operated as a scheduled domestic passenger flight by Lineas Aéreas Nacionales Sociedad Anónima (LANSA), crashed after a lightning strike ignited a fuel tank while it was en route from Lima, Peru, to Pucallpa, Peru, killing 91 people—all of its 6 crew-members and 85 of its 86 passengers. The sole survivor was Juliane Koepcke, who fell 2 miles (3.2 km) down into the Amazon rainforest strapped to her seat and remarkably survived the fall, and was then able to walk through the jungle for 10 days until she was rescued by local fishermen.
- 2012 November 4: a plane was reported as exploding off the coast of Herne Bay, Kent, while in flight. This did not turn out to be the case; rather, the plane became part of the flash channel, causing observers to report the plane and surrounding sky appeared bright pink.
- 2019 May 5: Aeroflot Flight 1492, a Sukhoi Superjet 100, was, according to the flight captain, struck by lightning on take-off, damaging electrical systems and forcing the pilots to attempt an emergency landing. The plane hit the ground hard and caught on fire, which engulfed the plane on the runway. Of the 78 people on board, 41 were killed.

=== Most-stricken human ===
- Roy Sullivan national park ranger, died 1983, holds a Guinness World Record after surviving seven different lightning strikes. He had multiple injuries across his body.

=== Longest lightning bolt ===
A 2017 lightning bolt across the midwestern United States set the record for the longest lightning bolt ever detected. The bolt stretched for 829 km (515 miles) from Dallas, Texas, to Kansas City, Missouri. The World Meteorological Organization confirmed its record-breaking status in July 2025.

== See also ==
- Fulgurites are a CG lightning discharge event that can produce "petrified lightning", demonstrating the enormous amount of energy transferred by lightning column.
- Geomagnetically induced currents are phenomena related to space radiation, causing transients and electrical irregularities that impact electrical and data-transmission systems on a broad scale.
