= Dobri dol =

Dobri dol or Dobri Dol may refer to the following villages:

In Bulgaria

- Dobri dol, Kyustendil Province, a village near Treklyano
- Dobri dol, Montana Province, a village near Lom
- Dobri dol, Plovdiv Province, a village near Parvomay
- Dobri Dol, Varna Province, a village near Avren

In Croatia

- Dobri dol, Zagreb, a neighbourhood in Maksimir

In the Republic of Macedonia

- Dobri Dol, Sopište Municipality, a village
- Dobri Dol, Vrapčište, a village

== See also ==
- Dobri Do (disambiguation)
- Dobrodol (disambiguation)
