= Rakotinci =

Rakotinci Ракотинци
- Village
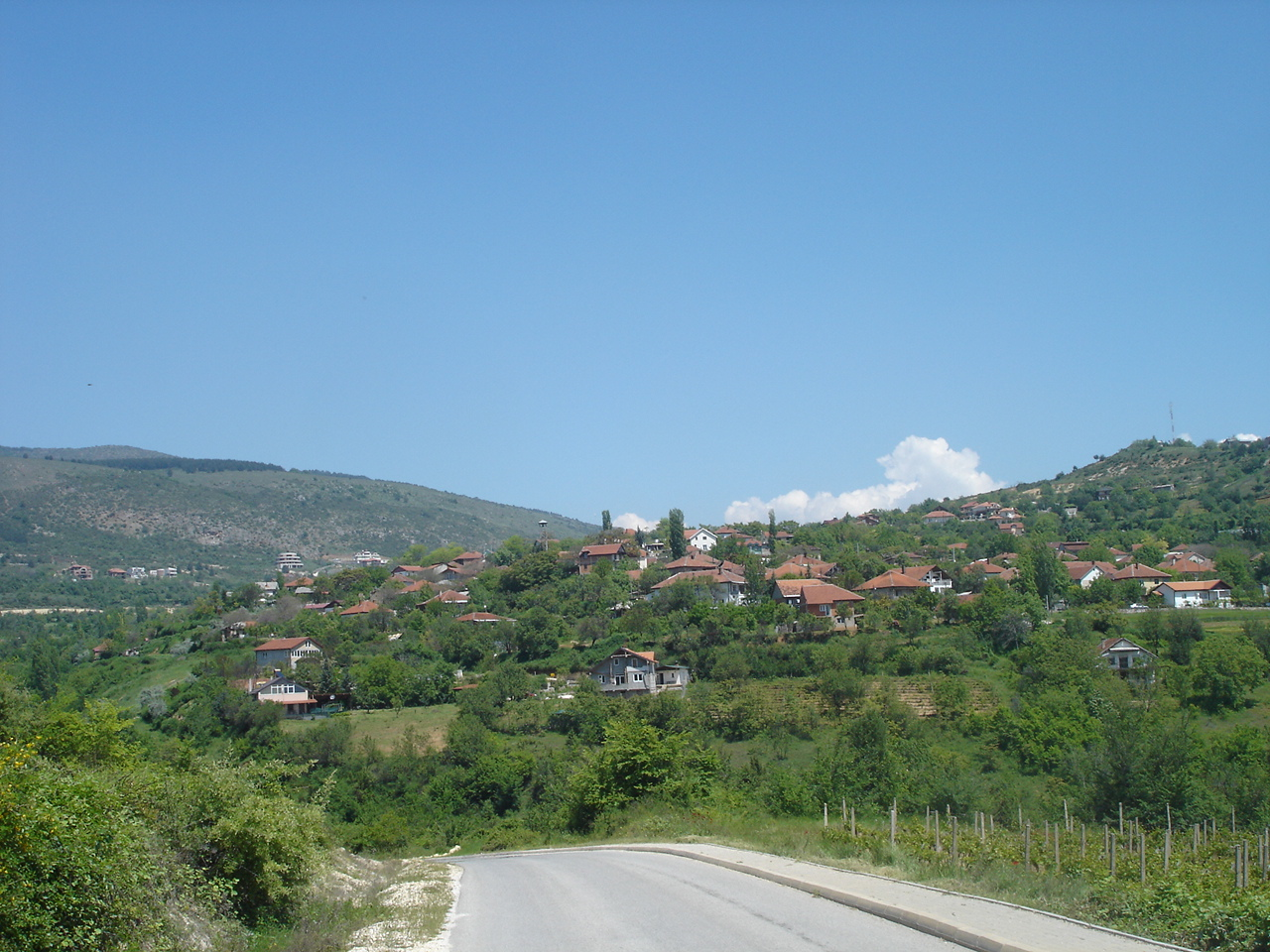

- Location within North Macedonia
- Coordinates: 41.940310°N 21.413708°E
- Country: North Macedonia
- Region: Skopje
- Municipality: Sopište

Population (2021)
  - Total: 694
- Time zone: UTC+1 (CET)
  - Summer (DST): UTC+2 (CEST)
- Website: .

Rakotinci (Macedonian: Ракотинци) is a village in the municipality of Sopište, North Macedonia.

== Demographics ==
As of the 2021 census, Rakotinci had 694 residents with the following ethnic composition:

- Macedonians 575
- Turks 47
- Albanians 46
- Persons for whom data are taken from administrative sources 16
- Serbs 7
- Vlachs 3

According to the 2002 census, the village had a total of 390 inhabitants. Ethnic groups in the village include:

- Macedonians 389
- Serbs 1
