= Držilovo =

Držilovo Држилово Dırjılova
- Village
- Location within North Macedonia
- Coordinates: 41°51′N 21°21′E
- Country: North Macedonia
- Region: Skopje
- Municipality: Sopište

Population (2002)
  - Total: 362
- Time zone: UTC+1 (CET)
  - Summer (DST): UTC+2 (CEST)
- Car plates: SK
- Website: .

Držilovo (Macedonian: Држилово; Turkish: Drjilova; Albanian: Dërzhillovë) is a village in the municipality of Sopište, North Macedonia.

== History ==
During the great migration movements in Macedonia at the end of the 17th and beginning of the 18th centuries, Slavic-speaking Muslims left the Debar area for the central regions of Macedonia and established villages such as Držilovo located in the Skopje area.

== Demographics ==
On the 1927 ethnic map of Leonhard Schulze-Jena, Držilovo is shown as an Albanian village. According to the 1929 ethnographic map by Russian Slavist Afanasy Selishchev, Držilovo was an Albanian village.

In the second half of the 20th century, Držilovo was inhabited by a Torbeši population.

According to the 2002 census, the village had a total of 362 inhabitants. Ethnic groups in the village include:

- Turks 242
- Macedonians 115
- Others 5
