= Čiflik, Sopište =

Čiflik Чифлик Çiflik
- Village
- Location within North Macedonia
- Coordinates: 41°56′50″N 21°21′10″E
- Country: North Macedonia
- Region: Skopje
- Municipality: Sopište

Population (2002)
  - Total: 636
- Time zone: UTC+1 (CET)
  - Summer (DST): UTC+2 (CEST)
- Car plates: SK
- Website: .

Čiflik (Macedonian: Чифлик, Albanian: Çiflik) is a village in the municipality of Sopište, North Macedonia.

== Demographics ==
According to the 2002 census, the village had a total of 636 inhabitants. Ethnic groups in the village include:

- Albanians 634
- Macedonians 2
