= Dobri Dol, Sopište =

Dobri Dol Добри Дол
- Village
- Location within North Macedonia
- Coordinates: 41.927353°N 21.405871°E
- Country: North Macedonia
- Region: Skopje
- Municipality: Sopište

Population (2002)
  - Total: 431
- Time zone: UTC+1 (CET)
  - Summer (DST): UTC+2 (CEST)
- Website: .

Dobri Dol (Macedonian: Добри Дол) is a village in the municipality of Sopište, North Macedonia.

== Demographics ==
According to the 2002 census, the village had a total of 431 inhabitants. Ethnic groups in the village include:

- Macedonians - 424 (98.3%)
- Turks - 1 (0.2%)
- Serbs - 1 (0.2%)
- Vlachs- 2 (0.4%)
- Others - 3 (0.6%)
