= Dobri Do, Ivanjica =

Dobri Do Добри До
- Village
- Location within Serbia
- Coordinates: 43°30′30″N 20°20′22″E
- Country: Serbia
- District: Moravica District
- Municipality: Ivanjica

Area
  - Total: 45.96 km^{2} (17.75 sq mi)

Population (2011)
  - Total: 244
  - Density: 5.31/km^{2} (13.8/sq mi)
- Time zone: UTC+1 (CET)
  - Summer (DST): UTC+2 (CEST)

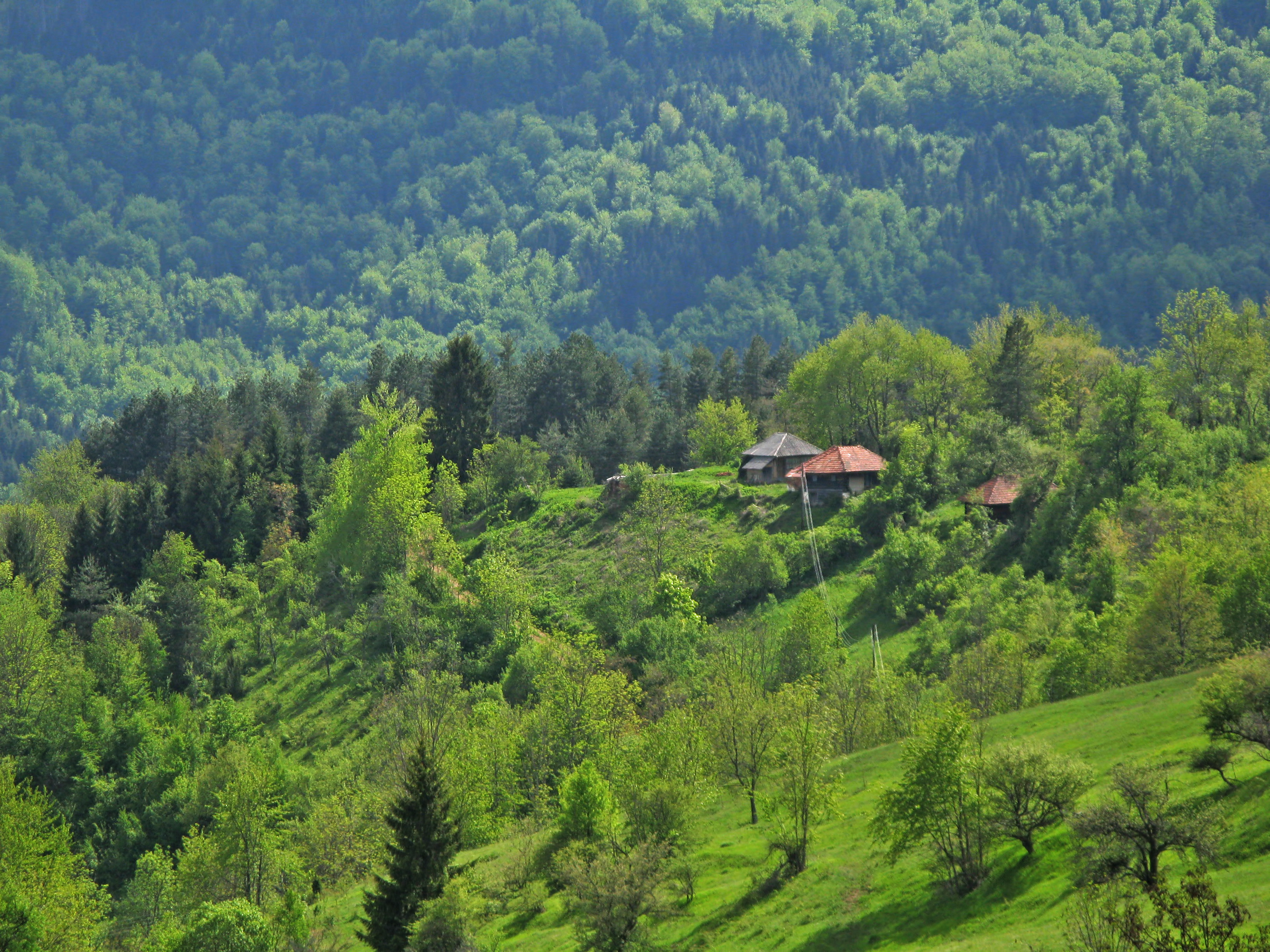
Forests, Meadows, and Houses of Dobri Do in Spring

Dobri Do is a village in the municipality of Ivanjica, Serbia. According to the 2011 census, the village has a population of 244 inhabitants.
