= Dobrodo =

- Village
- Location within Serbia
- Coordinates: 43°53′N 19°57′E
- Country: Serbia

Population (2022)
  - Total: 194
- Time zone: UTC+1 (CET)
  - Summer (DST): UTC+2 (CEST)

Dobrodo (Serbian Cyrillic: Добродо) is a village located in the Užice municipality of Serbia. According to the 2022 census, the village had a population of 194.
