= Dobri, Hungary =

Dobri
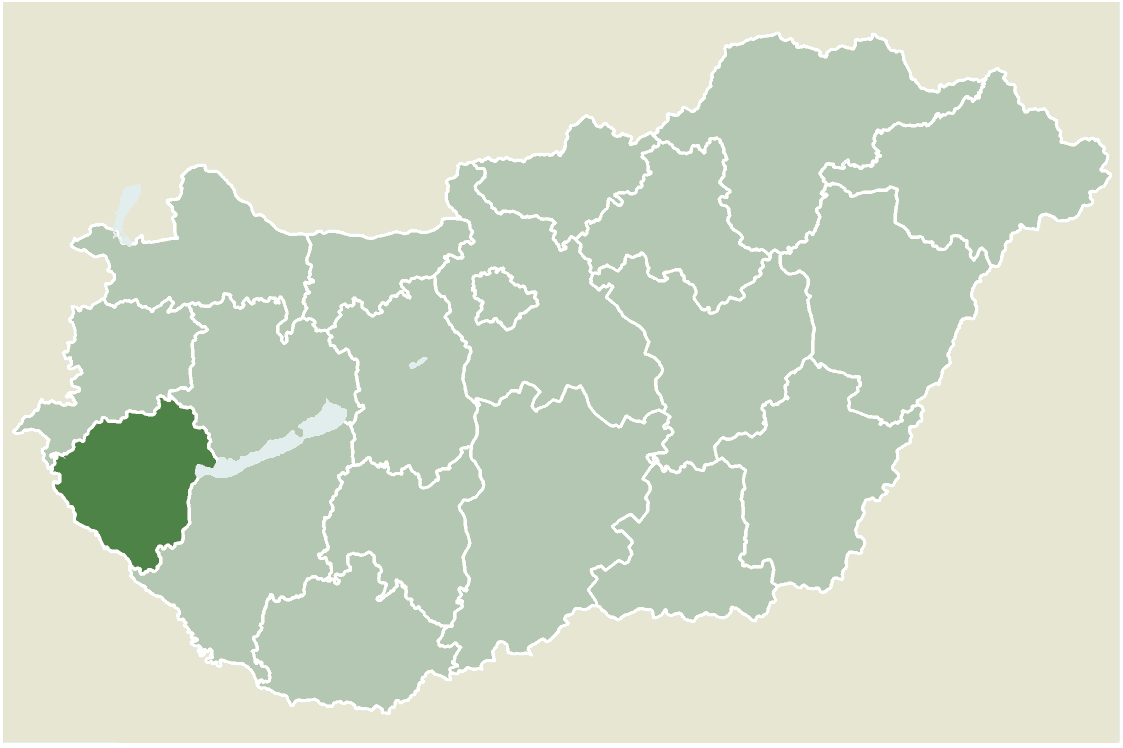
- Location of Zala county in Hungary

- Location of Dobri
- Coordinates: 46.51624°N 16.58099°E
- Country: Hungary
- County: Zala

Area
  - Total: 7.89 km^{2} (3.05 sq mi)

Population (2004)
  - Total: 203
  - Density: 25.72/km^{2} (66.6/sq mi)
- Time zone: UTC+1 (CET)
  - Summer (DST): UTC+2 (CEST)
- Postal code: 8874
- Area code: 92
- Motorways: M70

Dobri (Croatian: Dobriba) is a village in Zala County, Hungary, close to the border with Slovenia.
