= Dobri (given name) =

Dobri (Bulgarian: Добри) is a Bulgarian masculine given name that may refer to

- Dobri Bozhilov (1884–1945), Prime Minister of Bulgaria
- Dobri Chintulov (1822–1886), Bulgarian poet, teacher and composer
- Dobri Dobrev (1914–2018), Bulgarian ascetic
- Dobri Dobrev (footballer) (born 1982), Bulgarian football midfielder
- Dobri Dzhurov (1916–2002), Bulgarian politician and military leader
- Dobri Hristov (1875–1941), Bulgarian composer
- Dobri Veličkovski (1943–2006), Macedonian politician
- Dobri Voynikov (1833–1878), Bulgarian teacher, playwright and journalist
- Dobri Zhelyazkov (1800–1865), Bulgarian businessman
