= Don Dobri Airport =

- IATA: none; ICAO: SCDD

Summary
- Airport type: Public
- Serves: Puerto Varas, Chile
- Elevation AMSL: 226 ft / 69 m
- Coordinates: 41°14′05″S 72°30′54″W

Map
- Location of Don Dobri Airport in Chile

Runways
| Direction | Length | | Surface |
| Direction | m | ft | Surface |
|---|---|---|---|
| 15/33 | 590 | 1,936 | Grass |
- Source: Landings.com Google Maps

Don Dobri Airport (ICAO: SCDD) is an airstrip 3 kilometres (1.9 mi) southeast of Ensenada (es), a village on the eastern shore of Llanquihue Lake in the Los Lagos Region of Chile.

== See also ==
- Transport in Chile
- List of airports in Chile
