= Barovo, Sopište =

Barovo Барово Barovë
- Village
- Location within North Macedonia
- Coordinates: 41°56′42″N 21°20′41″E
- Country: North Macedonia
- Region: Skopje
- Municipality: Sopište

Population (2002)
  - Total: 23
- Time zone: UTC+1 (CET)
  - Summer (DST): UTC+2 (CEST)
- Car plates: SK
- Website: .

Barovo (Macedonian: Барово, Albanian: Barovë) is a village in the municipality of Sopište, North Macedonia.

== Demographics ==
According to the 1467-68 Ottoman defter, Barovo appears as being inhabited by an Orthodox Albanian population. Some families had a mixed Slav-Albanian anthroponomy - usually a Slavic first name and an Albanian last name or last names with Albanian patronyms and Slavic suffixes.

The names are: Staj-ko the son of Rusha, Stepan the son of Stajko, Niko the son of Dimitri, Vlado the son of Lazor, Doba the son of Rush, Stepan the son of Krydosa (Kry- Dosac), Minço his brother, Daba son of Persuka (Petr Suka), Damjan son of Vaso.

According to the 2002 census, the village had a total of 23 inhabitants. Ethnic groups in the village include:

- Albanians 13
- Macedonians 9
- Serbs 1
