= Dobri Do, Smederevo =

Dobri Do Добри До
- Village (Selo)
- Location within Serbia
- Coordinates: 44°29′16″N 20°57′43″E
- Country: Serbia
- District: Podunavlje District
- Municipality: Smederevo

Population (2022)
  - Total: 810
- Time zone: UTC+1 (CET)
  - Summer (DST): UTC+2 (CEST)

Dobri Do is a village in the municipality of Smederevo, Serbia. According to the 2011 census, the village has a population of 1049 people.
