= Dobri Do, Pirot =

Dobri Do Добри До
- Village
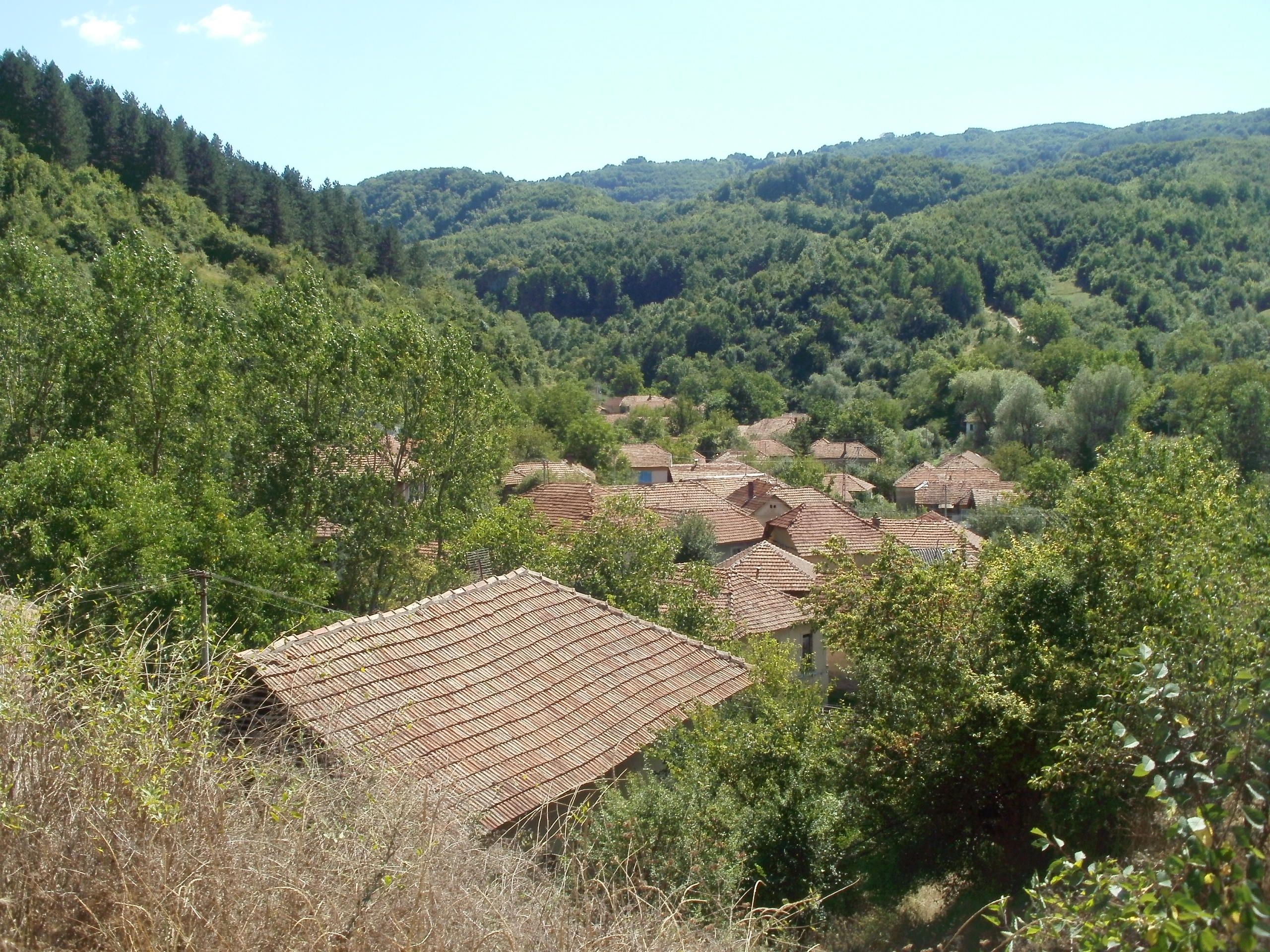

- Location within Serbia
- Coordinates: 43°12′49″N 22°38′1″E
- Country: Serbia
- Region: Southern and Eastern Serbia
- District: Pirot
- Municipality: Pirot

Population (2002)
  - Total: 116
- Time zone: UTC+1 (CET)
  - Summer (DST): UTC+2 (CEST)

Dobri Do is a village in the municipality of Pirot, Serbia. According to the 2002 census, the village has a population of 116 people.
