= Dolno Sonje =

Dolno Sonje Долно Соње
- Village
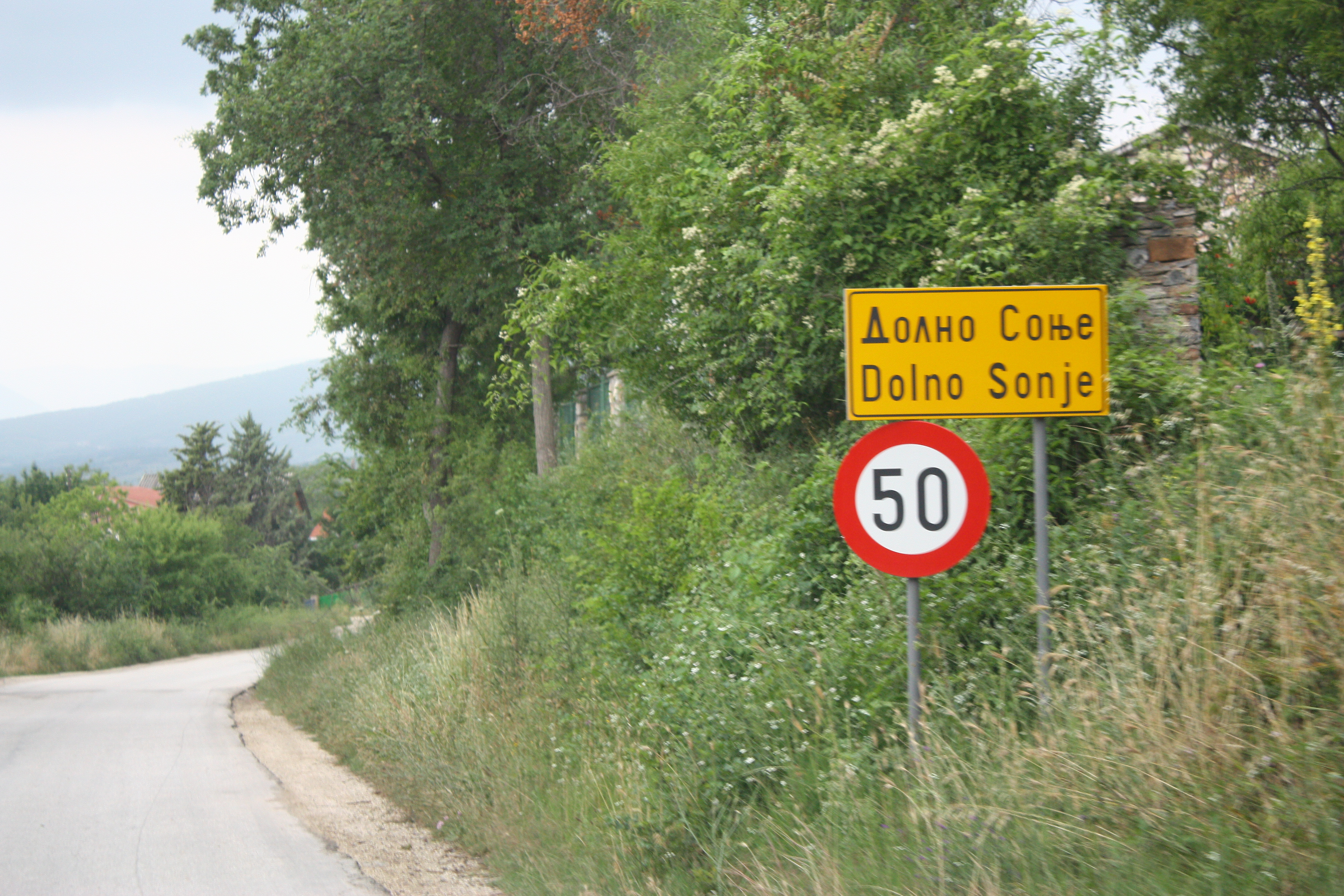
- Dolno Sonje

- Location within North Macedonia
- Country: North Macedonia
- Region: Skopje
- Municipality: Sopište

Population (2021)
  - Total: 793
- Time zone: UTC+1 (CET)
  - Summer (DST): UTC+2 (CEST)
- Website: .

Dolno Sonje (Macedonian: Долно Соње) is a village in the municipality of Sopište, North Macedonia. It is located on the other side of Mount Vodno from Skopje, but a road running around the mountain connects the two communities.

Dolno Sonje is a popular vacation spot for its clean air, beautiful surroundings, and medieval churches.

== Demographics ==
As of the 2021 census, Dolno Sonje had 793 residents with the following ethnic composition:

- Macedonians 689
- Persons for whom data are taken from administrative sources 82
- Serbs 9
- Vlachs 7
- Others 6

According to the 2002 census, the village had a total of 689 inhabitants. Ethnic groups in the village include:

- Macedonians 678
- Serbs 4
- Aromanians 2
- Others 5

Most residents work in Skopje.
