= Dobry, Russia =

Dobry (Russian: До́брый; masculine), Dobraya (До́брая; feminine), or Dobroye (До́брое; neuter) is the name of several rural localities in Russia.

== Belgorod Oblast ==
As of 2010, two rural localities in Belgorod Oblast bear this name:

- Dobroye, Grayvoronsky District, Belgorod Oblast, a selo in Grayvoronsky District
- Dobroye, Shebekinsky District, Belgorod Oblast, a selo in Shebekinsky District

== Jewish Autonomous Oblast ==
As of 2010, one rural locality in the Jewish Autonomous Oblast bears this name:

- Dobroye, Jewish Autonomous Oblast, a selo in Oktyabrsky District

== Kaliningrad Oblast ==
As of 2010, one rural locality in Kaliningrad Oblast bears this name:

- Dobroye, Kaliningrad Oblast, a settlement in Nizovsky Rural Okrug of Guryevsky District

== Kaluga Oblast ==
As of 2010, three rural localities in Kaluga Oblast bear this name:

- Dobroye, Maloyaroslavetsky District, Kaluga Oblast, a village in Maloyaroslavetsky District
- Dobroye, Zhukovsky District, Kaluga Oblast, a village in Zhukovsky District
- Dobraya, Kaluga Oblast, a village in Baryatinsky District

== Kursk Oblast ==
As of 2010, one rural locality in Kursk Oblast bears this name:

- Dobroye, Kursk Oblast, a selo in Dobro-Kolodezsky Selsoviet of Solntsevsky District

== Lipetsk Oblast ==
As of 2010, one rural locality in Lipetsk Oblast bears this name:

- Dobroye, Lipetsk Oblast, a selo in Dobrovsky Selsoviet of Dobrovsky District

== Moscow Oblast ==
As of 2010, one rural locality in Moscow Oblast bears this name:

- Dobroye, Moscow Oblast, a settlement in Tsarevskoye Rural Settlement of Pushkinsky District

== Oryol Oblast ==
As of 2010, one rural locality in Oryol Oblast bears this name:

- Dobry, Oryol Oblast, a settlement in Saburovsky Selsoviet of Orlovsky District

== Smolensk Oblast ==
As of 2010, two rural localities in Smolensk Oblast bear this name:

- Dobry, Smolensk Oblast, a village in Bogdanovskoye Rural Settlement of Roslavlsky District
- Dobroye, Smolensk Oblast, a village in Slobodskoye Rural Settlement of Ugransky District

== Tula Oblast ==
As of 2010, two rural localities in Tula Oblast bear this name:

- Dobroye, Bogoroditsky District, Tula Oblast, a village in Krasnobuytsky Rural Okrug of Bogoroditsky District
- Dobroye, Suvorovsky District, Tula Oblast, a selo in Dobrinskaya Rural Territory of Suvorovsky District

== Tver Oblast ==
As of 2010, three rural localities in Tver Oblast bear this name:

- Dobroye, Ostashkovsky District, Tver Oblast, a village in Ostashkovsky District
- Dobroye, Penovsky District, Tver Oblast, a village in Penovsky District
- Dobraya, Tver Oblast, a village in Rzhevsky District
