= Albanians in North Macedonia =

Ethnic group

Albanians in North Macedonia Shqiptarët në Maqedoninë e Veriut Албанци од Северна Македонија
Total population
- 619,187 (2021 census) (Note: Number does not include people with Albanian ancestry who are not citizens of North Macedonia and citizens in the diaspora who did not choose to self-enumerate in the census)

Regions with significant populations
- North Macedonia: 446,245 (2021)
- Diaspora: 172,942 (2021) (Note: Macedonian citizens of Albanian descent who have not resided in North Macedonia for at least one year but chose to self-enumerate in the census)

Languages
- Albanian; Macedonian

Religion
- Majority Islam: (Sunni Islam; Bektashism); Minority Christianity: (Roman Catholicism; Eastern Orthodoxy)

Related ethnic groups
- Other Albanian subgroups

Albanians in North Macedonia (Albanian: Shqiptarët në Maqedoninë e Veriut, Macedonian: Албанци од Северна Македонија, romanized: Albanci od Severna Makedonija) are ethnic Albanians who constitute the second largest ethnic group in North Macedonia, forming 446,245 individuals or 24.3% of the resident population. Of the 2,097,319 total population in the 2021 census (including self-enumerated diaspora), 619,187 or 29.52% are Albanians.

== Geography ==
The Albanian minority is concentrated mostly in the western, north-western and partially middle area of the country with small communities located in the south-west. The largest Albanian communities are in the cities and surrounding regions of Tetovo, Gostivar, Debar, Struga, Kičevo, Kumanovo and Skopje. Smaller numbers are also found in and/or around the cities of Ohrid, Kruševo, Resen, Bitola and Veles.

=== Toponymy ===
A number of placenames in North Macedonia have been considered as being ultimately derived through Albanian. Some cases include:

- Štip (Shtip in Albanian) is a city in eastern North Macedonia. It was known in antiquity as Astibo-s. About the date of settlement of Proto-Albanians in eastern North Macedonia similar arguments as in the case of Nish have emerged.
- Ohrid (Ohër in Albanian) is a city in southwestern North Macedonia. It has been proposed that the modern name is a modified version of the ancient Greek name, where the transition of "Lychnidus" to "Ohrid".
- Skopje (Shkupi in Albanian) is the capital of North Macedonia. Scupi as it was known in Classical Antiquity.
- Drin is a river in western North Macedonia. It is recorded in Ancient Greek as Drilon (Δρίλων) and in Latin as Drinus. The form Drin- has been evidenced by Pliny the Elder (fl. 1st century AD) and is most likely primary. The ancient name Drinus has undergone sound changes reaching the current Albanian form Drin through the evolution of Albanian sound changes.
- Veles (Qyprill in Albanian) was renamed during Ottoman rule as Köprülü, named after the noble Köprülü family.
- Malesia (Malësia in Albanian) is a small region north of Struga. The toponym Malesija is of Albanian origin from the word Malësi meaning a mountainous area or region.
- Šar (Sharr in Albanian) is a mountain range in Kosovo, Albania and North Macedonia.

== History ==
=== Antiquity ===
The multi-layered Albanian dialects in western Macedonia demonstrate that they have, at different stages, immigrated into an area that was inhabited by Proto-Albanians since antiquity. The name development of 'Shtip' and 'Shkupi' may indicate that Proto-Albanian was spoken in the region in pre-Slavic antiquity. Mihaescu argues that Albanian evolved in a region with much greater contact to Western Romance regions than to Romanian-speaking regions, and located this region in present-day Albania, Kosovo and Western North Macedonia, spanning east to Bitola and Pristina.

The toponym Albanopolis has been found on a funeral inscription in Gorno Sonje, near the city of Skopje (ancient Scupi), present-day North Macedonia. It was discovered in 1931 by Nikola Vulić and its text was analyzed and published in 1982 by Borka Dragojević-Josifovska. The inscription in Latin reads "POSIS MESTYLU F[ILIUS] FL[AVIA] DELVS MVCATI F[ILIA] DOM[O] ALBANOP[OLI] IPSA DELVS". It is translated as "Posis Mestylu, son of Flavia, daughter of Delus Mucati, who comes from Albanopolis". It dates to the end of the 1st century CE or the beginning of the 2nd century CE.

The ethnonym Albanos was found on a funeral inscription from ancient Stobi in 1992 in present-day North Macedonia, near Gradsko about 90 km to the southeast of Gorno Sonje. The inscription in ancient Greek reads "ΦΛ(ΑΒΙΩ) ΑΛΒΑΝΩ ΤΩ ΤΕΚΝΩ ΑΙΜΙΛΙΑΝΟΣ ΑΛΒΑΝΟ(Σ) ΜΝΗΜ(Η)Σ [ΧΑΡΗΝ]" ("In memory of Flavios Albanos, his son Aemilianos Albanos"). It dates to the 2nd/3rd century AD.

=== Middle Ages ===
The Slavic migration probably shaped the present geographic spread of the Albanians. It is likely that Albanians took refuge in the mountainous areas of northern and central Albania, eastern Montenegro, western North Macedonia and Kosovo. Long-standing contact between Slavs and Albanians might have been common in mountain passages and agriculture or fishing areas, in particular in the valleys of the White and Black branches of the Drin and around the Shkodër and Ohrid lakes. The contact with one another in these areas have caused many changes in Slavic and Albanian local dialects.

Placenames with the designation Arbanasi, an archaic term for Albanians, are usually found in "onomastic provinces" throughout the area of western, northeastern, central and southern North Macedonia: located in the area of Skopje, Kumanovo, Sveti Nikole, Stip, Kratovo, Prespa, Bitola, Ohrid, Prilep, Kichevo, Gostivar, and Tetovo. These "Albanian onomastic provinces" in the area of North Macedonia are chronologically old, which speaks of early contacts of Arbanasi (Albanians) with Latin and Old Slavic, and goes against the idea of a late 18th-century migration of Albanians into Macedonia.

In a document of Serbian King Stefan Milutin that dates between 1293 and 1302, in which the citizens of Štip are named, there are several figures listed with Albanian names and anthroponomy. Likewise, in a charter issued by the same ruler in 1300, it is noted that whoever visited the market of Skopje - be they Greek, Bulgarian, Serbian, Latin, Albanian, or Vlach - must pay the dues in both Tetovo and Gračanica. Furthermore, in a 1330 letter by Serbian Tsar Stefan Dušan, several figures with Albanian names and anthroponomy (including the last name Arbanasin, which literally means Albanian) were recorded. In 1350 the Serbian Tsar had donated a church and a number of serfs to the nobleman Ivanko around the region of Štip, and among the serfs a certain Gin Arbanasi is attested.

Coinage of Albanian nobleman Andrea Gropa, Lord of Ohrid, findings dating to c. 1377 – c. 1385, inscribed in Old Serbian with his title as župan and gospodar, with his signature as "Po milosti Božijoj župan Gropa".

In a text by Emperor John VI Kantakouzenos there is mention of nomadic Albanians present in the vicinity of Ohrid at around 1328. Andrea Gropa ruled the region and the city of Ohrid as an ally of King of Serbia Vukašin Mrnjavčević until Vukašin's death in 1371, with Andrea beginning a rivalry with his son, Prince Marko. Ruling as an independent ruler since the time of Vukašin, Andrea became de jure independent from Prince Marko in 1371 and was referred to as Župan and Gospodar of Ohrid (Lord of Ochrid). He joined the Albanian ruler and noble Andrea II Muzaka, and managed to take Kostur, Prilep and all Dibër region from Marko by that year. During Andrea's reign, the Gropa family forged their own coins.

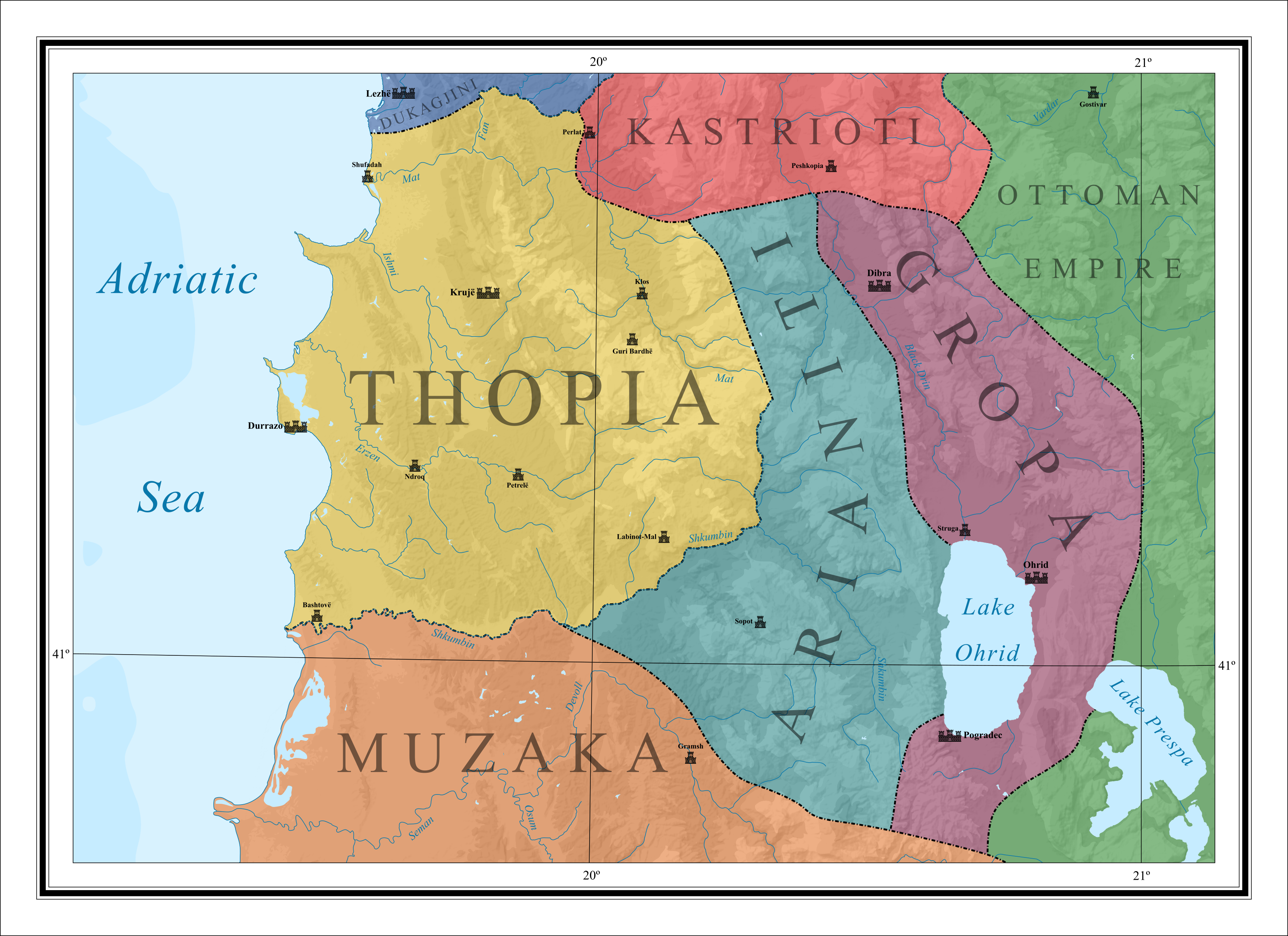
Gropa domains located in modern-day North Macedonia in the late 14th century

Albanian noble families controlled swathes of land in North Macedonia during different historical periods within the Middle Ages. The Gropa family ruled the regions between Pogradec, Ohrid and Debar during the 12th — 14th centuries. The presence of Albanians within modern-day North Macedonia is attested to by Serbian kings of the Middle Ages. In 1330, Stefan Dečanski explicitly mentioned the presence of Albanians and the Albanian names of villages in Kosovo, particularly in the district of Prizren, as well as within the district of Skopje. Between 1348 and 1353, Albanians are mentioned by Stefan Dušan as farmers and soldiers in the district of Tetovo and frequenters of the Fair of Saint George held in the vicinity of Skopje. In fact, entire Albanian villages were gifted by Serbian kings, especially by Stefan Dušan, as presents to the Serbian monastery of Tetovo, as well as to the monasteries of Prizren and Deçan.

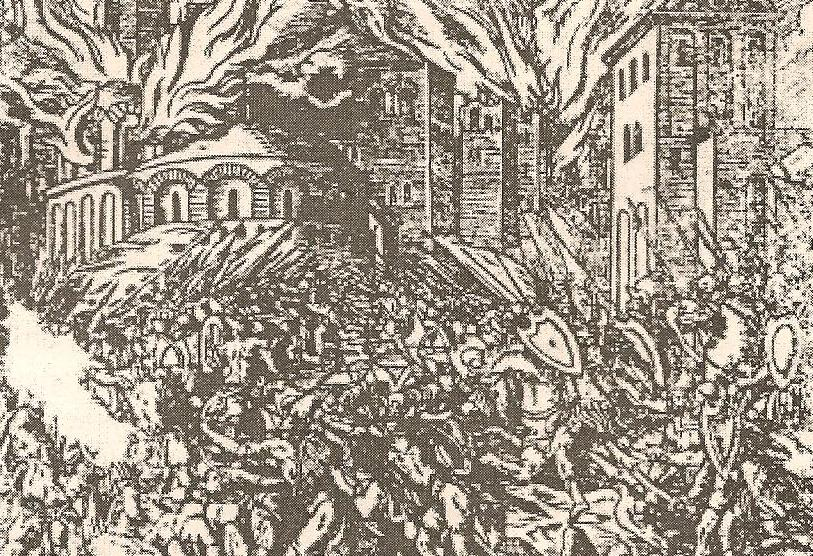
1480 engraving of an engagement between Albanian and Ottoman forces during the siege of Svetigrad.

In the Middle Ages, Dibër was part of the Principality of Kastrioti ruled by the royal Kastrioti family with Gjon Kastrioti on the Albanian throne. After the death of Gjon Kastrioti in 1437, the eastern region was annexed by the Ottomans and became seat of the Sanjak of Dibra. Skanderbeg carried out several military actions in the territory of modern-day North Macedonia during his rebellion against the Ottoman Turks, such as the Battle of Oranik and the Battle of Ohrid. Svetigrad had initially served as a fortress for the League of Lezhë before being taken by the Ottomans. Both Svetigrad and Modriç, along with the surrounding areas in the Dibër region, were under Skanderbeg's control. Skanderbeg’s mother Voisava Kastrioti was also recorded to have been from a valley called Polog in modern day North Macedonia which is also populated by the Albanian community of North Macedonia today.

=== Ottoman Empire ===
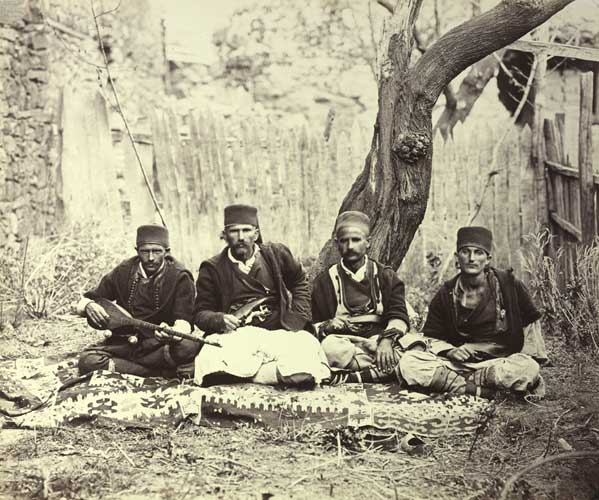
Albanians from Debar in 1863

The arrest and liquidation of local Albanophone pashas, most notably that of Abdurrahman Pasha of Kalkandelen (now Tetova) and his two brothers, Havzi Pasha of Üsküb (now Shkup) and Hussein Pasha of Kustendil, directly caused the Uprising of Dervish Cara, which occurred between 1843 and 1844. The rebels of this uprising were led by Dervish Cara, and they had the support of the Christian population as well as other Albanophone pashas. The revolt began in Üsküb in July 1843 and several Ottoman-controlled towns and regions were captured over the next two years - in North Macedonia, these territories included Gostivar, Tetova, Skopje, Kumanova, Ohrid and Manastir. The Ottoman government declared an amnesty, the abolishment of the new taxes and the postponement of the recruitment process, in an effort to disunite the rebels. In May 1844, the Ottoman army attacked the rebels, forcing them to retreat to the areas of Kalkandelen, Üsküb and Kumanova. Heavy fighting took place from 13 to 17 May 1844 in Katlanovo Pass, and on 18 May in Katlanovo thermals. The rebels could no longer resist the numerically superior and better-armed Ottoman army. In May–July, the Ottoman army retook all areas taken by the rebels. Dervish Cara was captured by Ottoman forces in summer 1844.

The resistance would continue in the Dibër valley, which was very strong under its local leaders. Ottoman forces led by Rexhep Pasha were defeated by the rebels in the field of Mavrova. The rebels in the Sanjak of Dibër were led from Sheh Mustafa Zerqani, a Bektashi priest. In a meeting in November 1844 they declared that the old autonomy of Dibër was not to be changed. The rebel army led by Cen Leka tried to stop the advancing Ottoman army led by Hayredin Pasha. The Ottoman commander declared again an amnesty, the abolishment of the new taxes and the postponement of the recruitment process which would become voluntary in the future.

The League of Prizren fought against Bulgarian groups and repelled them in the regions of Köprülü, Përlep and Manastir, which were at that time inhabited by Albanians, wiping out the Bulgarian movements in those areas.

In a 1903 document by the Cartographic Society of Sofia, the villages of Struga Malesia were all registered with Albanian Orthodox majorities, but nowadays they have assimilated and identify as Macedonians. There is a sizeable amount of Turkified Albanians in Ohrid who originate from the cities of Elbasan, Durrës and Ulcinj. A significant part of the Muslim Albanian population of Kumanovo and Bitola was also Turkified during Ottoman rule.

Skopje after being captured by Albanian revolutionaries in August 1912 after defeating the Ottoman forces holding the city

An Albanian revolt took place against the Ottoman Empire lasted from January until August 1912. Albanians took Skopje on August. The revolt ended when the Ottoman government agreed to fulfill the rebels' demands, namely the creation of an Albanian Vilayet and expansion of Albanians rights on 4 September 1912.

German linguist Gustav Weigand described the process of Turkification of the Albanian urban population of Macedonia in his 1923 work Ethnographie Makedoniens (Ethnography of Macedonia). He writes that in the cities, especially noting Skopje and Bitola, many of the Turkish inhabitants are in fact Albanians, being distinguished by the difference in articulation of certain Turkish words, as well as their clothing and tool use. They speak Albanian at home, however use Turkish when in public. They refer to themselves as Turks, the term at the time also being a synonym for Muslim, with ethnic Turks referring to them as Turkoshak, a derogatory term for someone portraying themselves as Turkish.

=== Balkan Wars ===
Photograph of Albanian prisoners in front of the Kumanovo Municipality building after the Battle of Kumanovo

During the Balkan wars Serbia took control of cities in northern and western Ottoman Macedonia, lands inhabited by a large Albanian population. The advance of the Serbian army as well as the formation of local Chetnik groups was followed beatings, imprisonments, massacres, disarmaments, burnings of Albanian villages as well as looting Albanian possessions. In this state of war, large numbers of Albanians fearing persecution by the Serbian army fled to Anatolia, mostly from Kumanovo and Skopje but also from Veles, Prilep, Krushevo, Tetovo, Gostivar, Kichevo, Ohrid and Bitola. Most of these Muhacirs never returned. After the Battle of Kumanovo, Chetnik paramilitary groups supported by the Serbian Army attacked and expelled the Albanian populations of Kratovo, Štip, Veles, Kruševo and Bitola. Albanians were massacred in Skopje, Veles, Prilep, Tetovo, Gostivar and most other cities.

=== Yugoslavia ===
Shortly after the defeat of Turkey by the Balkan allies, a conference of ambassadors of the Great Powers (Britain, Germany, Russia, Austria-Hungary, France, and Italy) convened in London in December 1912 to settle the outstanding issues raised by the conflict. With support given to the Albanians by Austria-Hungary and Italy, the conference agreed to create an independent state of Albania, which became a reality in 1913. However, the boundaries of the new state were drawn in such a way that large areas with Albanian populations remained outside of Albania, including the area that would go on to become the Socialist Republic of Macedonia.

During the Skopje communist party conference held 12–13 August 1945, Qemal Sejfulla, a representative of the Turkish minority, although himself of Albanian origin from Kaçanik, declared that: "In the cities there are some regroupings - differentiations between Turks and Albanians. As it is known that the great Serbian policy towards the Albanian masses was a policy of physical liquidations. While the policy towards the Turks - was more tolerant, for which a very large part of the Albanians became Turks - were assimilated."

When the Socialist Republic of Macedonia was established in 1946, the constitution guaranteed the right of minorities to cultural development and free use of their language. Minority schools and classes in minority languages were introduced immediately, in order to counter the high percentage of illiteracy among these groups. In the following two decades, the communist party continuously introduced measures meant to promote the incorporation of the Albanian community into the economic and social life of the new socialist state through education, professional training, and social opportunities.

A policy of Turkification of the Albanian population was employed by the Yugoslav authorities in cooperation with the Turkish government, stretching the period of 1948–1959. A commission was created to tour Albanian communities in Macedonia, visiting Tetovo, Gostivar, Debar, Kičevo, Struga, Kumanovo, Gjorče Petrov and Resen. Starting in 1948, six Turkish schools were opened in areas with large Albanian majorities, such as Tearce, Gorna Banjica, Dolna Banjica Vrapčište as well as in the outskirts of Tetovo and Gostivar. In 1951–52, a total of 40 Turkish schools were opened in Debar, Kičevo, Kumanovo, Struga, Resen, Bitola, Kruševo and Prilep.

In 1952, Yugoslavia and Turkey signed a free emigration agreement that allowed for Muslims in Yugoslavia to migrate to Turkey. Some of these individuals from more northern portions of Yugoslavia did not complete their migrations and instead settled in Macedonia, including 10,643 Albanians from Sandžak.

Contemporary analysis described cases of resistance to the Turkish schools in the Polog area, with Albanian speaking students and teachers refused to attend Turkish schools. In Tetovo, none of the native teachers wanted to give lessons in Turkish, so substitutes from Skopje were brought in instead. Another notable case happened in Gostivar, where a teacher from Banjica, who according to the committees analysis: "even though he was born in the same village and his mother tongue is Turkish, when the Turkish school was opened he refused to teach in Turkish and had asked to work in Albanian villages ...". Thus the Yugoslav committee characterized the local population as having adopted a "Greater Albanian political worldview". Resistance against the opening of Turkish schools was most prevalent in Tetovo and Gostivar. In 1952, on the night of Eid al-Adha, the local Tetovo political leader Mehmet Riza Gega distributed flyers imploring Albanian parents from sending their children to Turkish speaking schools. In Gostivar the nationalist activist Myrtezan Bajraktari was detained and interrogated by the Yugoslav secret police (UDBA). During his interrogation he stated he openly opposed the Turkish schools, and that he does so "just so Albanians can feel like patriots and not allow themselves to be Turkified."

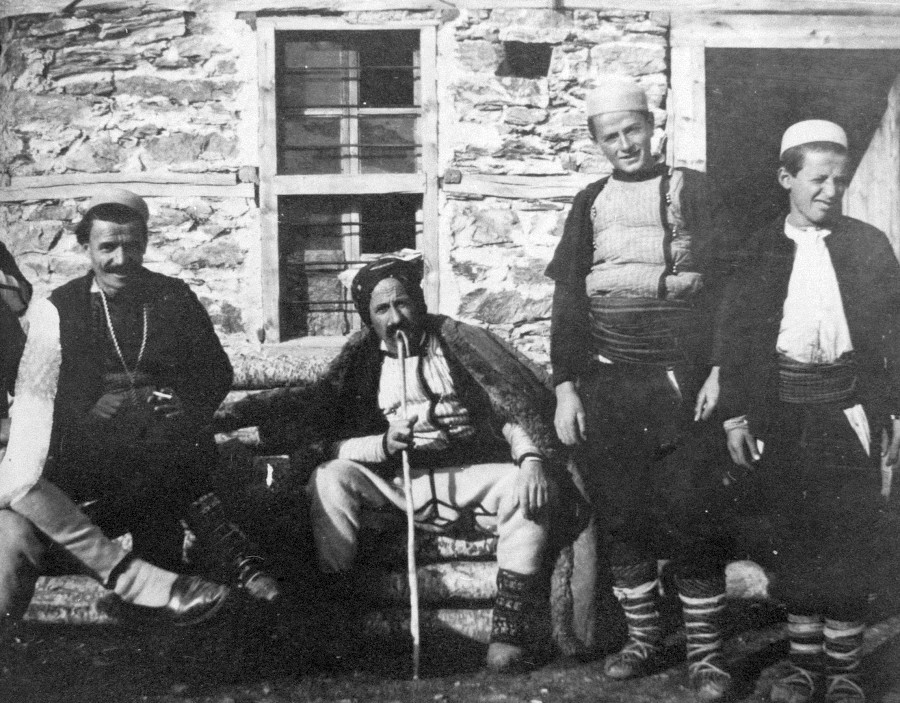
Albanians from Štirovica, Gostivar in 1907

In the late 1980s when the autonomy of the province of Kosovo was revoked, and the repression of the Albanian population significantly increased, these developments also took place in the Socialist Republic of Macedonia. Albanian was removed from public sight, Albanian families were prohibited from naming their children with Albanian names on the ground that it caused divisions with the other communities in the republic, and finally, to lower the significantly high birth rate of the Albanian population, Albanian families were prohibited from having more than two children. This assimilative campaign can be clearly seen by the fact that in 1990 the amended Constitution redefined the state from "a state of the Macedonian people and the Albanian and Turkish nationalities" to a "national state of the Macedonian people".

=== Contemporary ===
In 1994 the US Department of State's Report on Human Rights in Macedonia reported that the following forms of discrimination against ethnic Albanians existed in Macedonia: limited access to Albanian-language media and education; poor representation in public sector jobs; poor representation in the police corps; poor representation in the military officer corps; denial of citizenship to many long-time ethnic Albanian residents of Macedonia as well as discrimination in the process of citizenship applications; and unfair drawing of voting districts which dilutes their voting strength.

In the September 2002 elections, an SDSM-led pre-election coalition won half of the 120 seats in parliament. Branko Crvenkovski was elected Prime Minister in coalition with the ethnic Albanian Democratic Union for Integration (DUI) party and the Liberal-Democratic Party (LDP).

On 26 November 2019, an earthquake struck Albania. Albanians from North Macedonia responded in large numbers to the Albanian government's appeal for financial assistance through donations to various humanitarian organisations and special bank accounts fundraising for aid.

== Demography ==
According to the 1903 Austrian consular reports on ethnic composition of the kazas of the Sanjak of Skopje in 1903, the kaza of Kočani was populated by a total of 39,406 inhabitants, of whom 16,524 (41.93%) were Bulgarian Exarchists, 11,600 (29.44%) Ottoman Muslim, 7,800 (19.79%) Albanians, 1,680 (4.26%) Aromanians, 1,090 (2.77%) Patriarchists and 712 (1.8%) Romanis.

In the 1953 census, large portions of Albanians declared themselves as ethnic Turks:

- In the municipality of Lipkovo, 12,733 Albanians were registered in 1948 a number which dropped to 3609 in 1953. The Turkish population went from numbering 5 people in 1948, to 9,878 in 1953.
- In the municipality of Radostuša, 2,252 Albanians were registered in 1948 and 410 in 1953, with the Turkish community going from 7 members in 1948, to numbering 2,453 in 1953.
- In the municipality of Demir Hisar, 964 Albanians were registered in 1948 and 50 in 1953, with the Turkish community going from 6 members in 1948, to numbering 1,027 in 1953.
- In the municipality of Dolneni, 4,786 Albanians were registered in 1948 and 174 in 1953, with the Turkish community going from 1,005 members in 1948, to numbering 6,450 in 1953.
- In the municipality of Krivogaštani, 594 Albanians were registered in 1948 and 12 in 1953, with the Turkish community going from 2 members in 1948, to numbering 656 in 1953.
- In the municipality of Kruševo, 2,335 Albanians were registered in 1948 and 1,265 in 1953, with the Turkish community going from 3 members in 1948, to numbering 1,269 in 1953.
- In the then municipality of Tabanovce, 3,372 Albanians were registered in 1948 and 476 in 1953, with the Turkish community going from 436 members in 1948, to numbering 3,434 in 1953.
- In the municipality of Kičevo, 1,187 Albanians were registered in 1948 and 413 in 1953, with the Turkish community going from 1,748 members in 1948, to numbering 5,192 in 1953.
- In the municipality of Butel, 4,755 Albanians were registered in 1948 and 2,958 in 1953, with the Turkish community going from 14 members in 1948, to numbering 2,204 in 1953.
- In the municipality of Gjorče Petrov, 12,443 Albanians were registered in 1948 and 8,827 in 1953, with the Turkish community going from 48 members in 1948, to numbering 4,783 in 1953.
- In the municipality of Kumanovo, 3,919 Albanians were registered in 1948 and 1,331 in 1953, with the Turkish community going from 1,793 members in, to numbering 5,622 in 1953.
- In the municipality of Tetovo, 22,631 Albanians were registered in 1948 and 20,873 in 1953, with the Turkish community going from 306 members in 1948, to numbering 4,516 in 1953.
- In the then municipality of Dračevo, 7,006 Albanians were registered in 1948 and in 5,745 1953, with the Turkish community going from 178 members in 1948, to numbering 5,195 in 1953.
- In the municipality of Bitola, 13,166 Albanians were registered in 1948 and 4,014 in 1953, with the Turkish community going from 14,050 members in 1948, to numbering 29,151 in 1953.
- In the municipality of Rakotince, 2,494 Albanians were registered in 1948 and 1,362 in 1953, with the Turkish community going from 60 members in 1948, to numbering 4,538 in 1953.

Of the 203,087 Turks in Macedonia in 1953, 27,086 or 13.28% gave Albanian as their mothertongue.

Since the end of World War II, the Socialist Republic of Macedonia's population has grown steadily, with the greatest increases occurring in the ethnic Albanian community. From 1953 through the time of the latest census in 2002 (initial results were released December 2003), the percentage of Albanians living in North Macedonia rose 25.2%. Most of the ethnic Albanians live in the western part of the country. According to the official census data, Albanians made up 19% of the total population in 1953. The population fell to 13% in 1961, but grew again in 1971 to 17%. The group formed 19.7% in 1981 and 21% in 1991. At the last census in 2002, the Albanian population was at 25.2%. Ethnologue in 2002 estimated some 500,000 people speaking Albanian in North Macedonia. In the decade since the republic declared independence from Yugoslavia, some Albanians have claimed to account for 30% of the population and demanded an appropriate share of power. On the other side, ethnic Macedonians said Albanians were barely 20%. However, the widely accepted number of Albanians in North Macedonia is according to the internationally monitored 2002 census. The census data estimated that Albanians account for about 25.2% of the total population. The 2012 census was not held and boycotted by the Albanian political parties. In the 2008 Macedonian parliamentary elections, Albanian political parties received 22.61% of the total vote, receiving 29 of 120 seats.

Albanian is co-official at a state level (excluding defense and monetary policy) and in local self-government units where speakers of the population are 20% or more. The change in status occurred in 2019 as use of Albanian became no longer geographically limited. The new law extended the official use of Albanian over the entire country, easing communication in Albanian with the institutions. Under the new legislation, Macedonian continues to be the primary official language, while Albanian may be used now as a second one, including at a national level in official matters. The legislation stipulates also all public institutions in the country will provide Albanian translations in their everyday work.

The Albanian population in the country is largely rural with ethnic Albanians forming a majority or plurality in only 3 of the country's 34 cities.

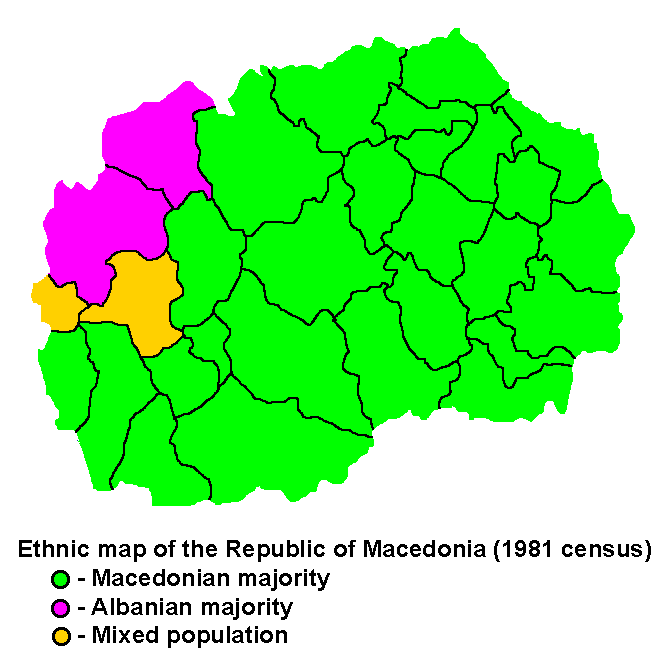
Albanians in North Macedonia, according to the 1981 census

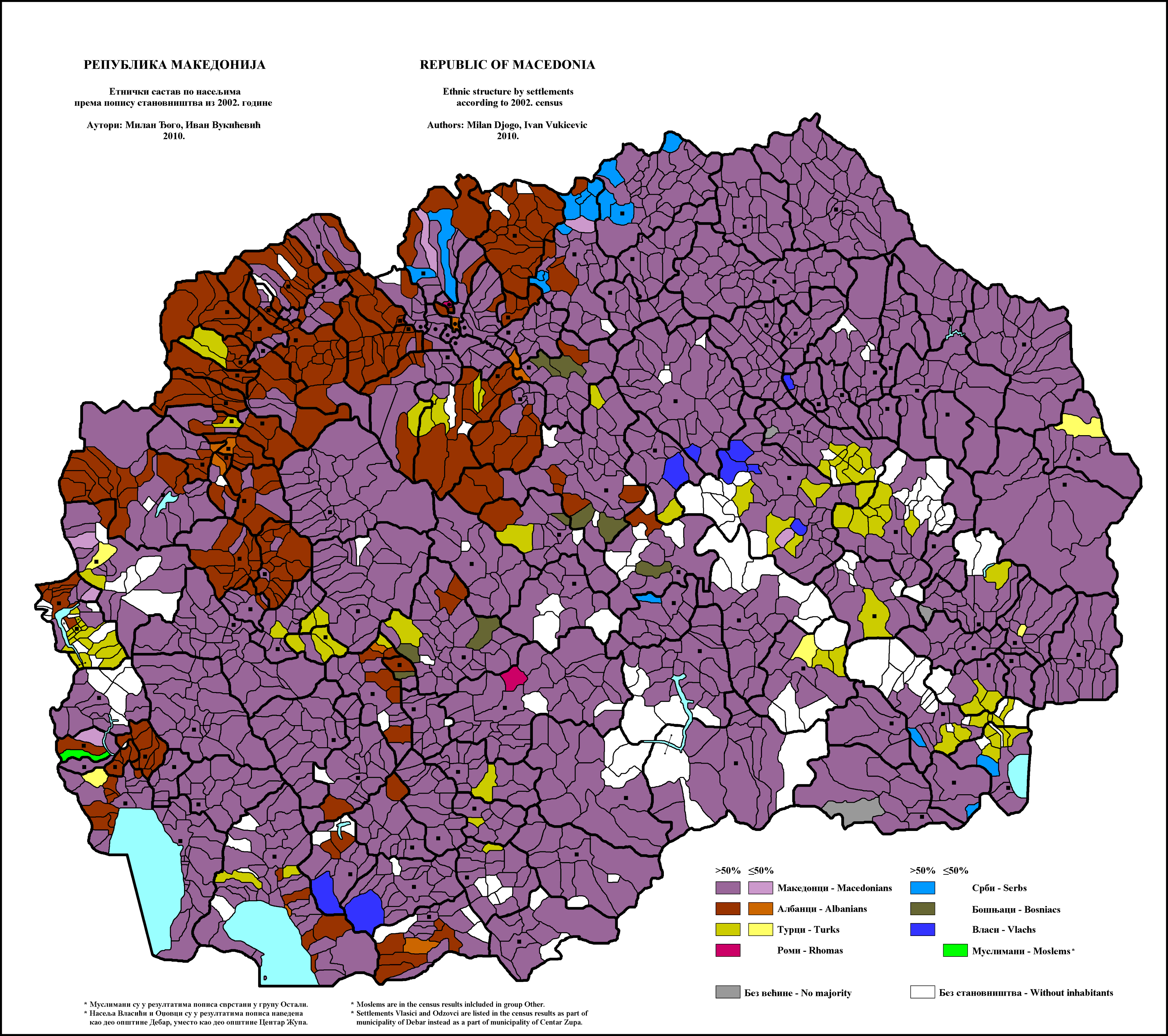
Predominant ethnic group by settlement with Albanians in brown, 2002 census

Majority ethnic groups of North Macedonia by municipality, 2002 census

Municipalities in North Macedonia colored according to the ethnic affiliation of the resident population, 2021 census

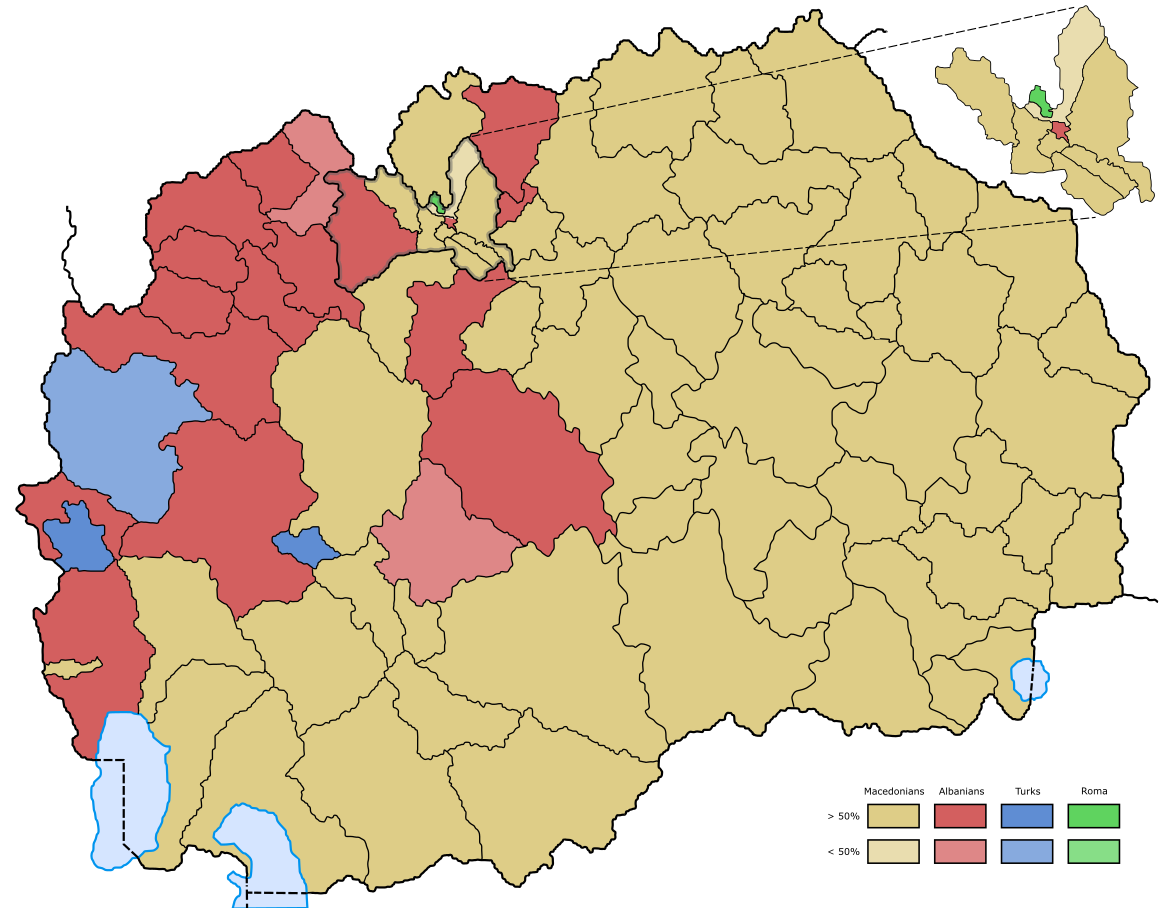
Municipalities in North Macedonia colored according to the ethnic affiliation of the total enumerated population, 2021 census

Around 35% of the newborns in North Macedonia belong to the Albanian ethnic minority. In 2017, 21,754 children were born in Macedonia. The ethnic affiliation of these newborns was: 11,260 (51.76%) Macedonian; 7,404 (34.03%) Albanians; 940 (4.32%) Turkish; 1,276 (5.87%) Roma; 40 (0.18%) Vlach; 129 (0.59%) Serbian; 213 (0.98%) Bosniaks; 492 (2,26%) other ethnic affiliation and unknown.

Newborns in North Macedonia according to ethnic group of the mother
Ethnic group	1994		2002		2012		2021	
Macedonians	16,704	49.88	13,639	49.13	11,995	50.89	9,338	50.08
Albanians	12,010	35.86	10,118	36.45	8,035	34.09	6,663	35.73
Turks	1,616	4.83	1,202	4.33	1,092	4.63	835	4.48
Romani	1,378	4.11	1,678	6.04	1,552	6.59	1,267	6.79
Serbs	403	1.20	168	0.61	125	0.53	123	0.66
Bosniaks					251	1.06	177	0.95
Vlach (Aromanians)	25	0.07	23	0.08	37	0.16	17	0.09
other / unspecified	1,351	4.03	933	3.36	481	2.04	228	1.22
Total	33,487		27,761		23,568		18,648	

=== Municipalities ===
According to the 2021 census, of the 80 municipalities in the country Albanians were the dominant resident ethnic group in 17 municipalities, with 15 having a resident ethnic Albanian majority and 2 a resident ethnic Albanian plurality. When accounting the total population, including self-enumerated diaspora, Albanians make up the majority in 16 municipalities and the plurality in 2.

Emblem	Municipality	Population		Enumerated population Includes residents plus citizens who have been abroad for more than 12 consecutive months who opted to participate in the 2021 census as diaspora	
Emblem	Municipality	Total	%	Total	%
	Aračinovo; Haraçinë	12,353	97.45%	14,329	97.54%
	Bogovinje; Bogovinë	20,475	89.39%	28,878	91.70%
	Brvenica; Bërvenicë	7,377	54.06%	11,812	64.48%
	Butel; Butel	14,095	37.12%	15,678	38.60%
	Čair; Çair	42,180	67.40%	47,460	68.81%
	Čaška; Çashkë	4,032	50.77%	4,367	51.83%
	Debar; Dibër	8,438	54.75%	11,720	59.24%
	Dolneni; Dollnen	4,442	33.84%	5,205	35.75%
	Gazi Baba; Gazi Babë	14,146	20.32%	16,271	22.07%
	Gostivar; Gostivar	33,076	55.34%	64,703	68.87%
	Jegunovce; Jegunoc	3,482	39.15%	5,070	47.32%
	Kičevo; Kërçovë	16,373	41.27%	31,610	55.72%
	Kruševo; Krushevë	2,464	29.39%	2,809	31.20%
	Kumanovo; Kumanovë	25,493	25.99%	36,984	32.80%
	Lipkovo; Likovë	21,560	96.65%	30,872	97.38%
	Saraj; Saraj	34,586	90.07%	39,936	90.66%
	Struga; Strugë	25,785	50.58%	41,863	59.72%
	Studeničani; Studeniçan	14,982	68.19%	16,192	68.82%
	Sopište; Sopisht	1,693	25.22%	1,901	27.20%
	Šuto Orizari; Shuto Orizari	8,828	34.32%	9,784	35.31%
	Tearce; Tearcë	14,704	83.10%	22,319	87.05%
	Tetovo; Tetovë	60,460	71.32%	78,860	75.46%
	Vrapčište; Vrapçisht	15,109	76.15%	25,308	81.30%
	Želino; Zhelinë	18,191	95.80%	27,439	96.68%
Source: Census 2021 - first dataset State Statistical Office of North Macedonia

== Politics ==
=== Parties ===
North Macedonia has a few Albanian parties. As of 2020 election The Democratic Union for Integration (DUI) and the Alliance for Albanians are the two largest Albanian political parties in the country. In the 2008 Macedonian parliamentary elections, DUI won 11.3% of the total vote, while DPA got 10.1%. However, due to pre-election fights between the two main Albanian political parties, some Albanian areas of the country have revoted.

In the 2011 Macedonian parliamentary elections, Albanian parties received 20.96% of the total popular vote. DUI received 10.2% of the vote, giving it 15 seats. This is a loss of 3 seats from the previous elections. DPA received 5.9% of the vote, winning 8 seats which is also a drop of 3 seats from the 2008 election. The third Albanian party to receive seats in parliament is the National Democratic Revival party which received two seats with 2.7% of the vote.

In the 2014 elections, three Albanian parties, DUI, DPA, and NDP won 19 seats, seven seats, and one seat, respectively, out of the 123 total seats. Ethnic Albanians parties received just under 21% of the total popular vote.

== Discrimination ==
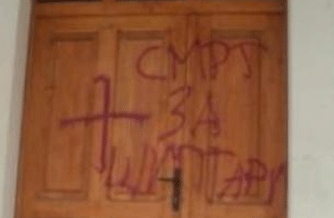
Anti-Albanian inscription written in Macedonian on a mosque, meaning "Death for Shiptars"

Ethnic tensions have simmered in North Macedonia since the end of an armed conflict in 2001, where in July 2001, former NLA fighters created the Albanian National Army (ANA, AKSh), and announced itself on 3 August 2001. The group participated in attacks against Macedonian forces alongside the NLA. After the NLA disbanded, the ANA began to operate in the Preševo Valley.

The Macedonian Academy for Science and Art was accused of Albanophobia in 2009 after it published its first encyclopaedia in which it was claimed that Shqiptar, the Albanian endonym that is primarily used by other Balkan peoples to describe Albanians, is considered derogatory by the Albanian community if used in South Slavic languages. The encyclopaedia also claimed that the Albanians settled the region in the 16th century. Distribution of the encyclopaedia was ceased after a series of public protests.

On 12 April 2012, five ethnic Macedonian civilians were shot dead – allegedly by ethnic Albanians – in an attack known as the Smilkovci lake killings. On 16 April 2012, a protest against these attacks and demanding justice was held in Skopje. Some of the participants in the protests were chanting anti-Albanian slogans.

On 1 March 2013 in Skopje, a mob of ethnic Macedonians protested against the decision to appoint Talat Xhaferi, an ethnic Albanian politician, as Minister of Defence. The protest turned violent when the mob started hurling stones and also attacking Albanian bystanders and police officers alike. The police reports 3 injured civilians, five injured police officers and much damage to private property. Although the city hospital reported treating five heavily injured Albanian men, two of which are on intensive care unit. During this protest part of the mob burned the Albanian flag. A mob of Macedonian nationalists also stormed the Macedonian Parliament on 27 April 2017 in reaction to the election of Talat Xhaferi as Speaker of the Assembly, numerous were injured during the riot.

On the 108th anniversary of the Congress of Manastir, the museum of the Albanian alphabet in Bitola was vandalized, the windows and doors were broken. A poster with the words "Death to Albanians" and with the drawing of a lion cutting the heads of the Albanian double-headed eagle was placed on the front doors of the museum. One week after this incident, on the day of the Albanian Declaration of Independence, graffiti with the same messages, as those of the previous week, were placed on the directorate of Pelister National Park.

=== Current issues ===
Amongst the unemployed, Albanians are highly overrepresented. In public institutions as well as many private sectors they are underrepresented. They also face discrimination by public officials and employers. According to the United States' Country Report on Human Rights 2012 for Macedonia, "certain ministries declined to share information about ethnic makeup of employees". The same report also added:

"...ethnic Albanians and other national minorities, with the exception of ethnic Serbs and Vlachs, were underrepresented in the civil service and other state institutions, including the military, the police force, and the intelligence services, as well as the courts, the national bank, customs, and public enterprises, in spite of efforts to recruit qualified candidates from these communities. Ethnic Albanians constituted 18 percent of army personnel, while minority communities as a whole accounted for 25 percent of the population according to statistics provided by the government."

As of 2019, the Albanian language is a co-official language in the country.

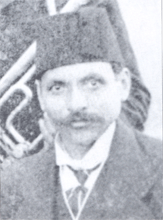
Nikollë Bojaxhiu, a Kosovo Albanian Catholic who later lived in Skopje, where his daughter Mother Teresa was born

== Religion ==
The main religion among Albanians in North Macedonia is Islam, though there are some who are Roman Catholic, with the most prominent member Agnes (Anjeza) Bojaxhiu, also known as Mother Teresa. Another prominent figure is the composer Lorenc Antoni.

=== Eastern Orthodox ===
Orthodox Christian Albanian villages located in Upper Reka, as well as historic communities in Ohrid, Malesia, Resen, Kumanovo (in particular the nearby abandoned village of Dumanovce) as well as Bitola city and certain surrounding villages (Trnovo, Nižepole and Magarevo). These communities largely assimilated into the Slavic corpus.

Presence of Eastern Orthodoxy in the Albanians of North Macedonia has been recorded since the Middle Ages. In 1426, Albanian nobleman Gjon Kastrioti had donated the right to the proceeds from taxes collected from the villages Rostuše and Trebište and from the church of Saint Mary, which was in one of them, to the Serbian monastery Hilandar. Another Albanian noble, Andrea Gropa, became a ktitor for a church in Ohrid dedicated to St. Clement. Gropa also was the last Christian ruler of Ohrid before the Ottoman conquest. His signature is found in the scriptorium of the Church of St. Sofia in Ohrid.

In the 18th century, Orthodox Albanian refugees fleeing the socio-political and economic crises in what is now southern Albania, settled in Krusevo, often in groups of families and led by a priest. Orthodox Albanians arrived from Vithkuq and the Opar region while local Kruševo traditions also relate that other families arrived from Korçë and the villages of Polenë, Dardhë, and Mborje. In the beginning of the 19th century, Orthodox Albanians from Moscopole settled in Kruševo, founding the so called Ohtul di Arbinesh (Hill of the Albanians) neighborhood. This community would soon assimilate into the Aromanian population of the city. In the early 20th century, Kruševo consisted of a mixed population of 4,950 Bulgarians, 4,000 Vlachs (Aromanians) and 400 Christian Albanians, according to Bulgarian geographer Vasil Kanchov's statistics. Due to intermarriage with locals, at the onset of the twentieth century few in the small local Orthodox Albanian community spoke Albanian. A neighbourhood inhabited by Aromanians in Kruševo still bears the name Arbineš meaning Albanians in the Aromanian language. Per Bulgarian teacher Nikola Kirov, who was native to the town, most of the Orthodox Albanians were (sic) Grecomans.

During the Ottoman period, besides the ethnic Turks and the majority Slavic population, Prilep was also home to both a Sunni Muslim and Orthodox Christian Albanian community, which lived alongside. Serbian historiographer Jovan Hadži-Vasiljević writes that:

"Between Turks and Muslim Albanians who have lived in the city (Prilep), it is very difficult to distinguish, especially between the old families of the city. The Mohammedan Albanian families, as soon as they arrived in the city, merged with the Turks, just as the Christian Albanian families merged with the Slavs or the Greeks"

Bulgarian researcher, Georgi Traichev, wrote that:

"In the city of Prilep, there were no pure Greeks, but there are several (dozens) of Grecomans supported by schismatic Vlachs and Albanian Christians."

The newspaper Прилепу преди 100 години ("Prilep 100 years ago". Sofia, 1938) reports that after the arrival of Orthodox Albanians in the city around the 18th-19th century, the Christian Vlach and Albanian elements have assimilated under the influence of Bulgarian population, and that there are no longer any traces of them. Information is also given for Albanians of both denominations. Of the Orthodox Albanians, a part has been Bulgarianized, while others have been Hellenised. In the newspaper there is also a report about the Orthodox Albanian entitled Ico Kishari, whose family, along with the Tilevci, Georgimajkovci and Ladcovci, were Orthodox Albanian refugees from Moscopole who had settled in the beginning of the 19th century.

Two dozen Orthodox Albanians were recorded as living in the villages of Konopište and Mrežičko near Kavadarci in 1900. In 1905, Dimitar Mishev Brancoff gathered statistics about the Christian population of Macedonia, in which the population of Veles appears as consisting of, among others, 12 Christian Albanians.

In statistics gathered by Vasil Kanchov in 1900, the city of Skopje was inhabited by 31900 people, of whom 150 were Christian Albanians. Researcher Dimitar Gađanov wrote in 1916 that Gostivar was populated by, among others, 100 Orthodox Albanians.

== Culture ==
Albanians of North Macedonia often use the Flag of Albania

The spoken dialects of Albanian are Gheg, by majority, and Tosk in parts of the south. Education in Albanian is provided in all levels, including university levels, such as State University of Tetovo, South East European University, also in Tetovo.

Pjetër Bogdani (c. 1630–1689), known in Italian as Pietro Bogdano, is the most original writer of early literature in Albania. He is author of the Cuneus Prophetarum (The Band of the Prophets), 1685, the first prose work of substance written originally in Albania. Born in Gur i Hasit, Has, near Kukës district, Albania about 1630, Bogdani was educated in the traditions of the Catholic Church to which he devoted all his energy. His uncle, Andrea Bogdani (c. 1600–1683), was Archbishop of Skopje and author of a Latin-Albanian grammar, now lost.

== See also ==
- Demographics of North Macedonia
  - Albanians
- Albania–North Macedonia relations
- Republic of Ilirida
- Macedonians in Albania
