= Germiyan (disambiguation) =

Germiyan may refer to:

- Germijan, village in Pelagonia, North Macedonia
- Germiyanids, 14–15th-century dynasty in west Anatolia
- Germiyan, Azerbaijan, village in Khizi Rayon
- Garmian Region, region in Kurdistan region, Iraq
