= Borka Dragojević-Josifovska =

Bosnian archaeologist and philologist (1910–2004)

- Born: 1910; Gornja Srbica
- Died: 2004 (aged 93–94); Skopje
- Education: University of Belgrade
- Employer: Ss. Cyril and Methodius University of Skopje

Borka Dragojević-Josifovska, in Serbian: Борка Драгојевић-Јосифовска (1910 — 2004) was a Bosnian archaeologist, museum curator, numismatist and philologist, who was Professor of Classical Philology at Ss. Cyril and Methodius University of Skopje, and who worked mainly on classical archaeology in North Macedonia.

== Biography ==
Dragojević-Josifovska was born in 1910 in the Bosnian Serb village of Gornja Srbica, which was then part of the Austro-Hungarian empire. She graduated in 1934 with a degree in Classical Philology and Archaeology, awarded by the Faculty of Philosophy, University of Belgrade. From 1948 to 1958 she worked as a curator at the Archaeological Museum of Macedonia in Skopje, where in 1956 she curated the museum's lapidarium. She was then appointed as a lecturer Latin at the Department of Classical Philology at Ss. Cyril and Methodius University of Skopje, where she worked until 1976. From lecturer she was promoted to Senior Lecturer in 1969 and in 1974 to Associate Professor. She died in 2004 in Skopje.

== Research ==
Dragojević-Josifovska conducted excavations and undertook research on several sites across Macedonia. These included: Isar Marvinci, Dračevo, Živojno, Stobi, Skupi and others. In 1961 she led the first team to excavate at Isar Marvinci. During the excavation they uncovered the temple, an aqueduct and a burial monument which featured a soldier holding a Macedonian shield. She also studied the Petralice Hoard of 377 nummi, which was discovered in 1950 near Krivia Palanka.

She was a member of the editorial boards for the publication of ancient inscriptions from Yugoslavia and the Tabula Imperii Romani. She published the archaeological reports on the site of Gorno Sonje in 1982. Inscriptions from the site are significant, as they mention placenames connected to the Albanoi. One reads in Latin "POSIS MESTYLU F[ILIUS] FL[AVIA] DELVS MVCATI F[ILIA] DOM[O] ALBANOP[OLI] IPSA DELVS" ("Posis Mestylu, son of Flavia, daughter of Delus Mucati, who comes from Albanopolis"). It dates to the end of the 1st century CE and the beginning of the 2nd century CE. Dragojević-Josifovska added two lines to the existing reading: VIVA P(OSUIT) SIBI/ ET VIRO SUO. Delus Mucati is an Illyrian name and his home region was Albanopolis (domo Albanopoli). Dragojević-Josifovska proposed that like others he had settled in Macedonia from southern Illyria. She also published inscriptions from the site of Konjuh.

== Selected works ==
- Vodič niz lapidarium (1961)
- Prilog lokalizovanju grada Argosa u Peoniji (1965)
- Inscriptions de la Mésie Supérieure, vol. I (1976)
- Inscriptions de la Mésie Supérieure, vol. VI (1984)
- Depo folesa iz s. Petralice (Makedonija) (1990)

== Gallery ==
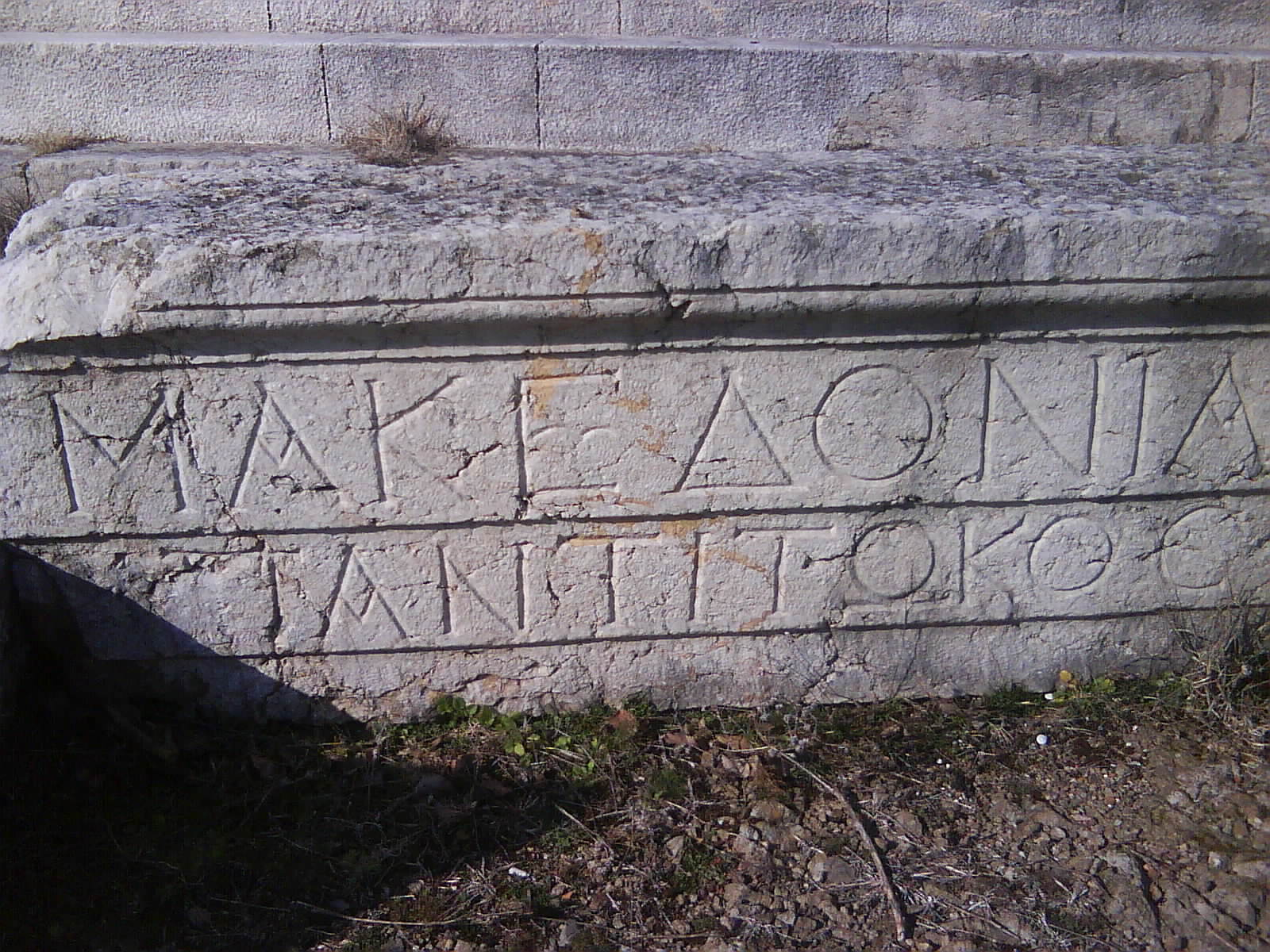
Inscription at Isar Marvinci

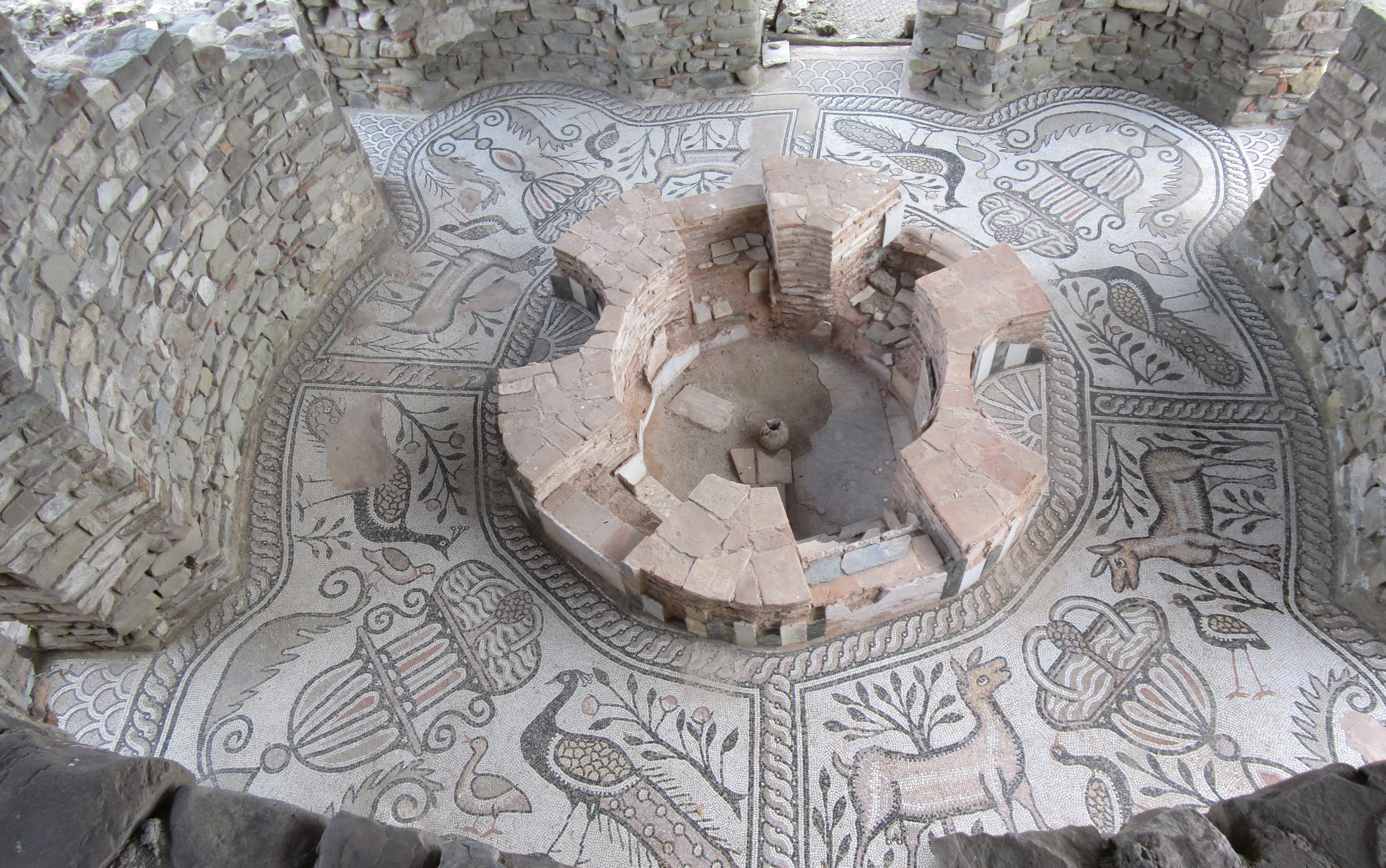
Mosaics in the baptistry in Stobi

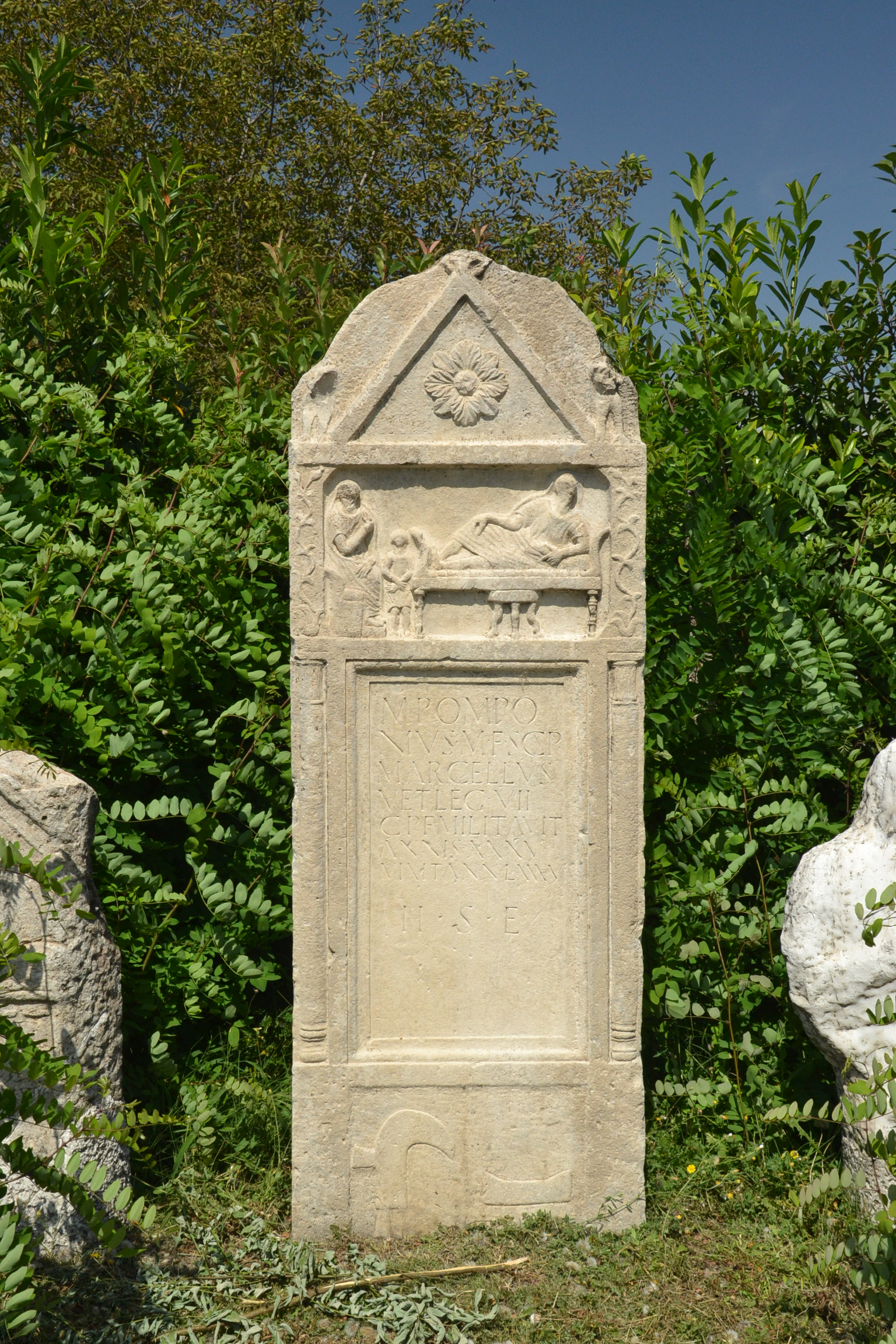
Grave marker in Scupi
