= Zaharia Gropa =

Albanian nobleman

Zaharia Gropa Zaharia Gropaj
- Lord of Pogradec
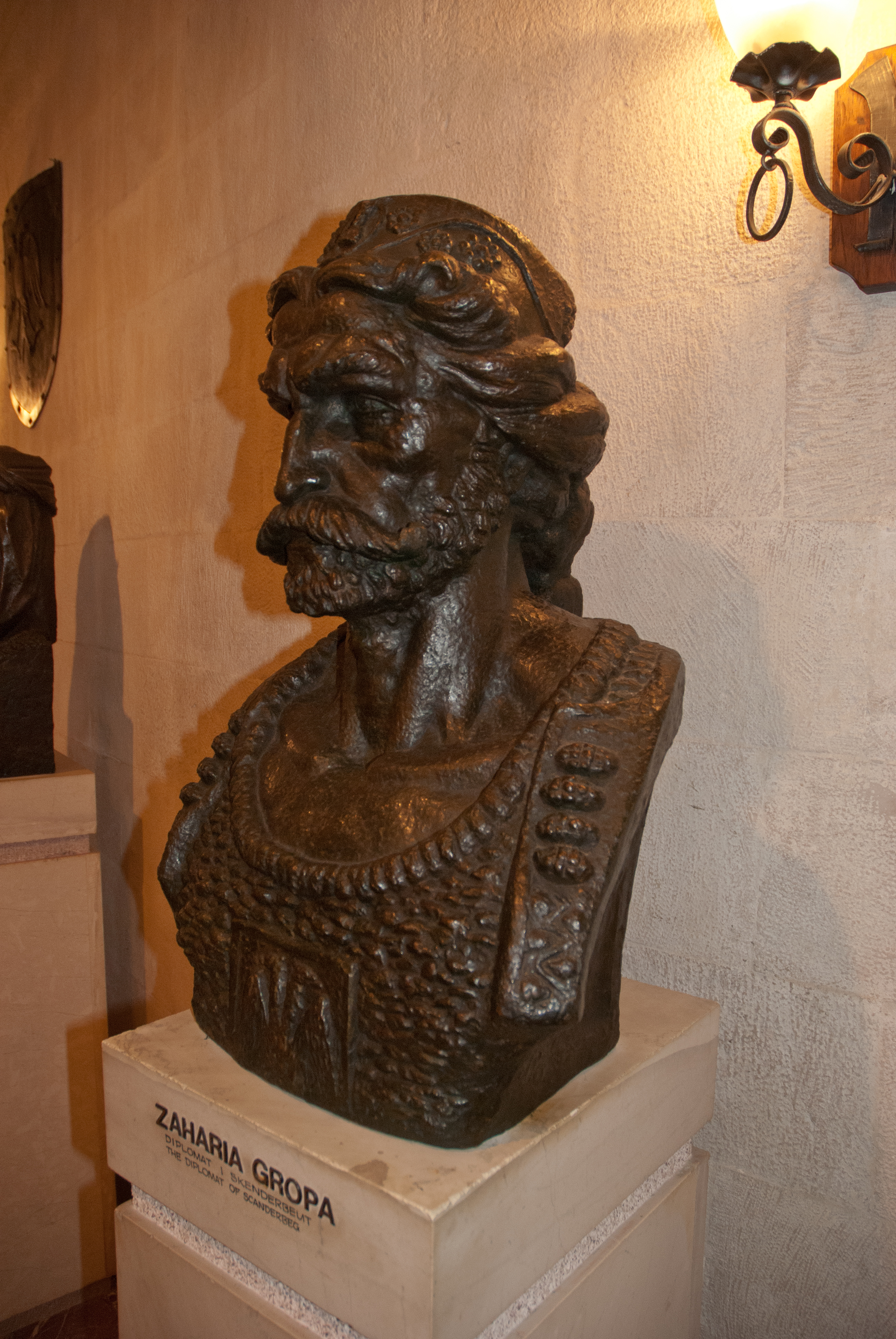
- Modern bust of Zaharia Gropa found in the Castle of Krujë

Prince of Pogradec
- Reign: 1444–1456
- Predecessor: Aidin Gropa
- Successor: Post Abolished.
- Dynasty: Gropa
- Occupation: Military commander during the League of Lezhë

Zaharia Gropa (Albanian: Zaharia Gropaj), also known as Zacharia, was an Albanian nobleman, military commander, and member of the Gropa family who historically ruled over parts of modern-day Albania and North Macedonia. He was a military commander who served in the forces of Skanderbeg during Skanderbeg's rebellion. He was also an associate of Moisi Dibra.

== Biography ==
Zaharia's dynasty, Gropa ruled over the areas of modern-day Pogradec and Ohrid (Albanian: Ohëri) and took titles such as Gospodar and Župan within the Serbian Empire.

Not much is known about him. In 1444 Zaharia joined the League of Lezhë against the Ottoman Empire. He became a military commander. Zaharia took part in the “Battle of Tumenisht” and he died in 1456–1457. A modern bust of him can be found in the Castle of Kruja, Krujë, Albania in his remembrance and was the last official ruler and heir of the Gropa dynasty.
