= Ostoja Rajaković =

Serbian nobleman

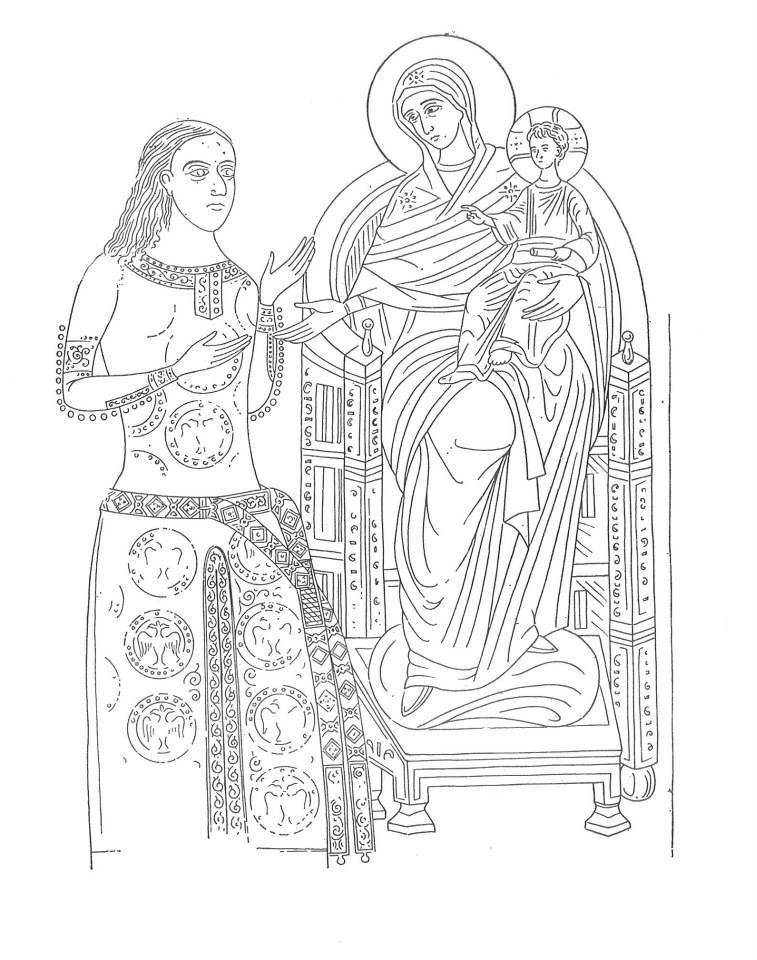
- Ostoja Rajaković with the Mother of God with Christ in the Church of the Theotokos Peribleptos, in Ohrid.
- Died: October 1379
- Occupation: Serbian nobleman in the service of Marko Mrnjavčević
- Relatives: Andrea Gropa (father-in-law)

Ostoja Rajaković (Serbian Cyrillic: Остоја Рајаковић, d. October 1379) was a Serbian nobleman in the service of Marko Mrnjavčević. He governed land around Ohrid. He was the son-in-law of župan (count) Andrea Gropa. He belonged to the Ugarčić family that hailed from Nevesinje.
