= Andrea Gropa =

14th century Albanian Lord

- Lord of Ohrid; Megas Zupanos (prefect) župan gospodar
- Coins minted by Andrea Gropa

Lord of Ohrid
- Reign: 1365–1371 (Vassal); 1371–1380 (Independent)
- Spouse: Chiranna Muzaka
- House: Gropa

Andrea Gropa also known as Andrija was a 14th-century Albanian nobleman who ruled the region and the city of Ohrid, first as a minor vassal for a very short time (župan) to Serbian King Vukašin Mrnjavčević (r. 1365–1371), then as independent after 1370. He was a rival to Prince Marko and together with Andrea II Muzaka managed to take Prilep and Kostur from him. He hailed from the noble Gropa family.

== Life ==
=== Ancestry ===
Andrea was a member of the Albanian Gropa family. His ancestor Pal Gropa was acknowledged by Charles I of Naples in 1273: "nobili viro sevasto Paulo Gropa »casalia Radicis maioris et Radicis minons, neс non Cobocheste, Zuadigorica, Sirclani et Craye, Zessizan sitam in valle de Ebu". During the Serbian expansion in Macedonia, the Gropa also moved towards the south, becoming neighbours with Arianiti and Spata.

=== Reign ===
After Emperor Dušan's death (1355), Gropa was a local ruler in the district of Ohrid. Prior to the Battle of Maritsa, Gropa was a vassal to the Mrnjavčević family. The King of Serbia Vukašin Mrnjavčević (r. 1365 – died 1371), held Western Macedonia as a co-ruler to Emperor Stephen Uroš V of Serbia (r. 1355 – died 1371). After the death of King Vukašin and his brother Jovan Uglješa at the Battle of Maritsa against the Ottomans in 1371, and the subsequent death of the Emperor, there was a crisis in appointing a successor to the throne. Vukašin's son, Marko, did not have the power to unite his lords, and only retained nominal rule over the area from his base at Prilep.

After Maritsa, the Dejanovići became Ottoman vassals. By 1377, Vuk Branković extended his rule over Skopje, and Gropa is mentioned as lord of Ohrid. Bogdan, Gropa and Marko, and the rest of the rulers in Western Macedonia became vassals to Murad I. The vassals had to pay tribute to the Ottoman sultan and supply troops in case of war.

According to the Muzaka chronicles, Gropa joined Andrea II Muzaka and the Balšić family against Marko; He gained Kostur and Debar, and became virtually independent from Marko. Andrea also participated in the Battle of Kosovo alongside other Albanian nobles as well.

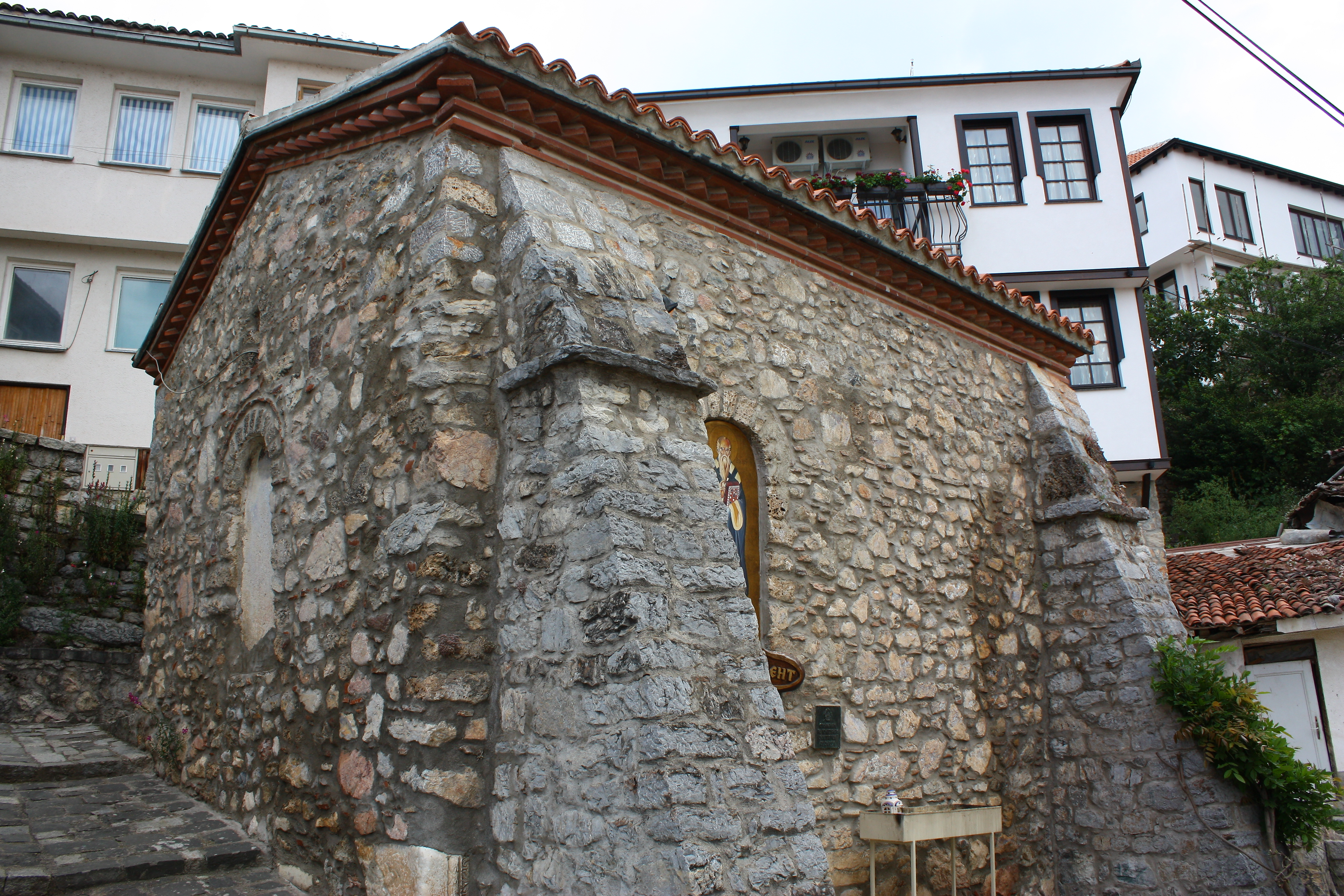
Lesser Saint Clement Church - Gropa is mentioned in its ktetor inscription.

=== Attestation and historiography ===
Gropa is mentioned as megas zupanos (župan veliki) in a Greek stone inscription dating to 1378. He set himself up as Grand Župan of Ohrid, in southwest Macedonia. In 1379, he became a ktitor for a church in Ohrid dedicated to St. Clement. Gropa was mentioned as "župan Gropa" in the funeral inscription of his son-in-law Ostoja Rajaković (1380).

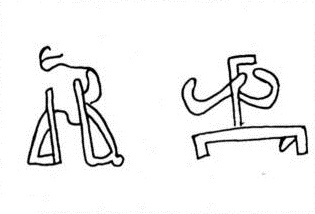
Monogram of Andrea Gropa from the Church of Saint Sophia, Ohrid

Gropa also minted coins, findings dating to c. 1377 – c. 1385, inscribed in Old Serbian with his title as župan and gospodar, with his signature as "Po milosti Božijoj župan Gropa". He was the last Christian ruler of Ohrid before the Ottoman conquest. His signature is found in the scriptorium of the Church of St. Sofia in Ohrid.

The date of Gropa’s death remains unknown. The Muzaka chronicles written by Gjon Muzaka, claims that Gropa had no surviving issue and his domains were inherited by the Principality of Muzaka after his death.

== Family ==
Gropa married Anne (Kyranna), the daughter of Andrea II Muzaka. His brother-in-law was Balša II Balšić. Gropa's son-in-law was Ostoja Rajaković, a lord in Ohrid and relative to Marko.

== Legacy ==
Gropa is, like other provincial lords during the breakdown and fall of the Serbian Empire (between 1354 and 1371), enumerated in the Serb epic poetry.

== Gallery ==
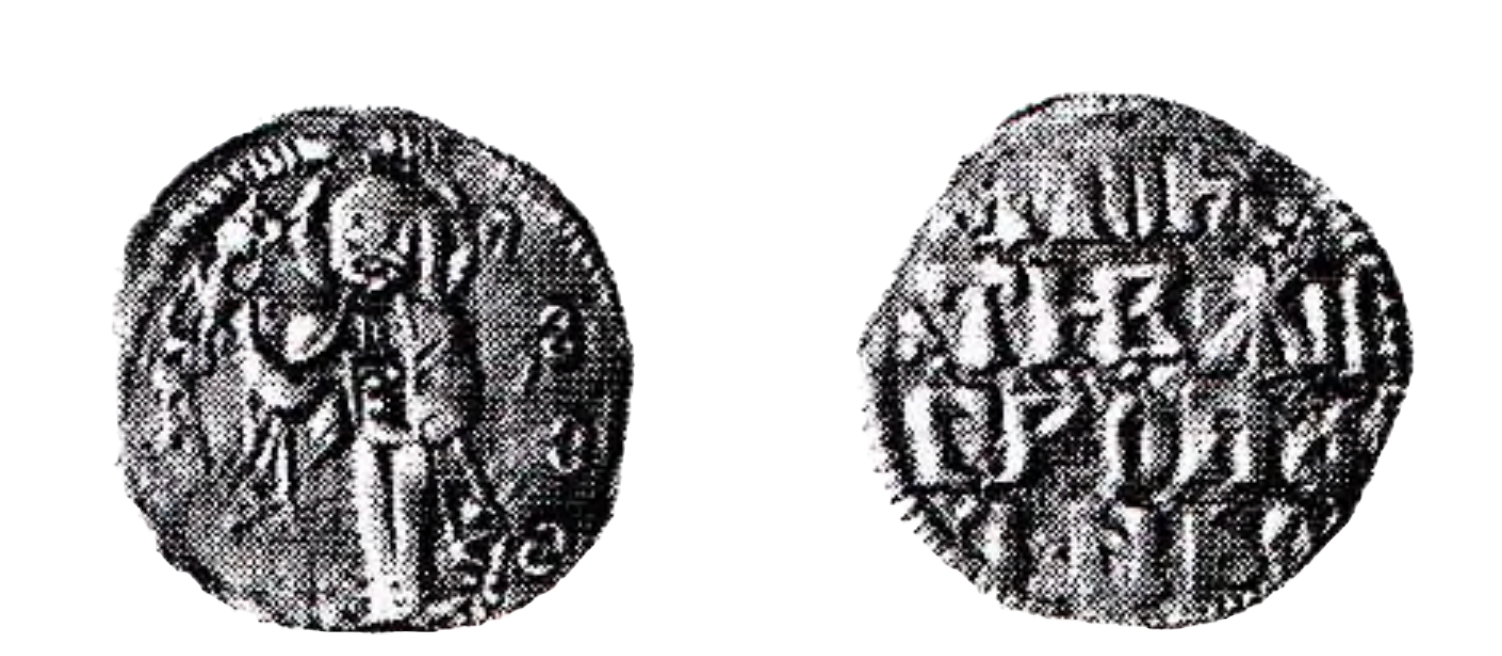
First type of coin minted by Andrea

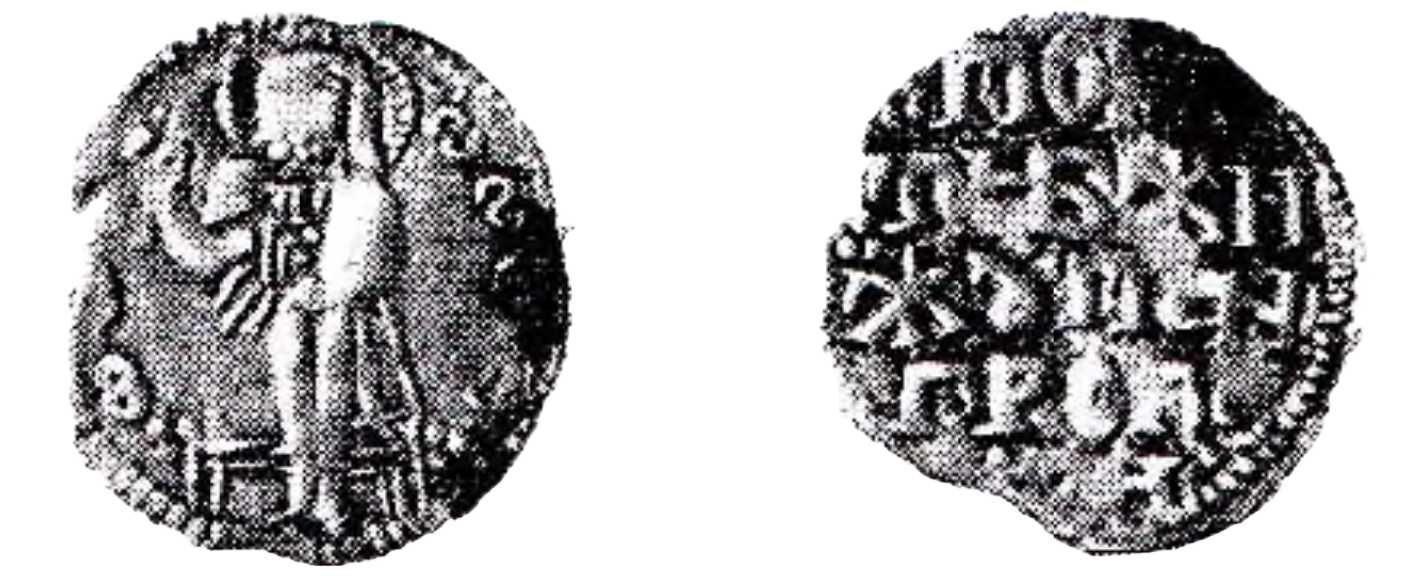
Second type of coin minted by Andrea

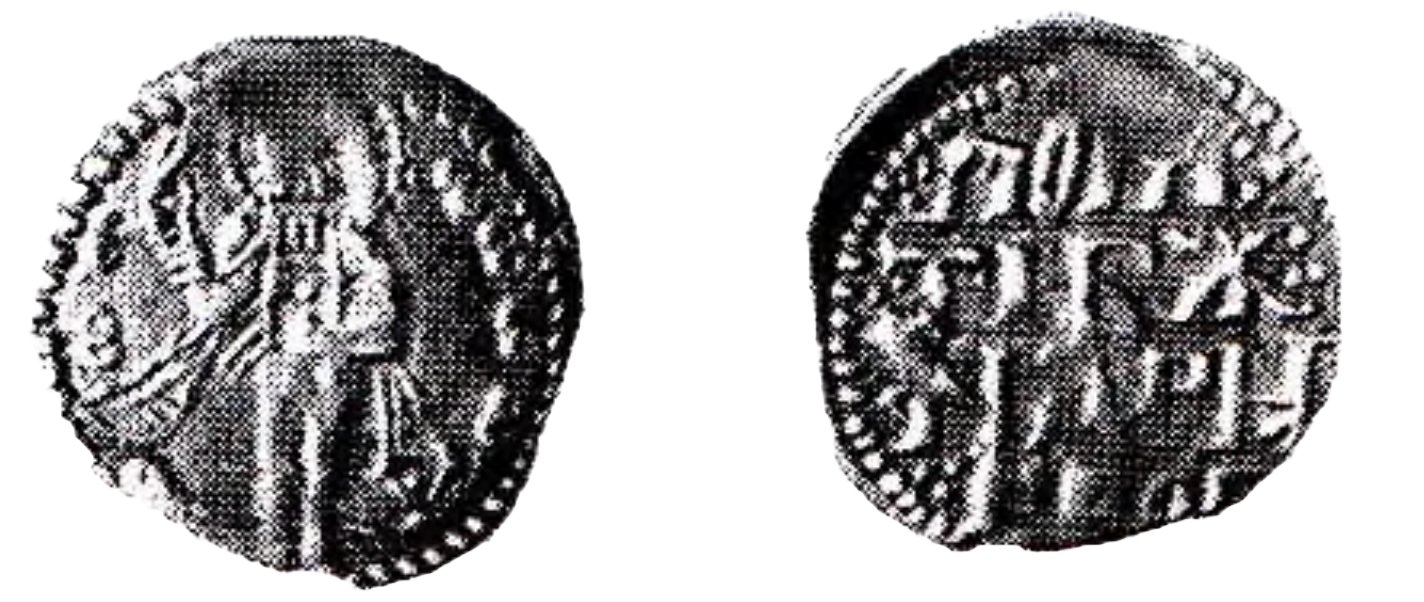
Third type of coin minted by Andrea

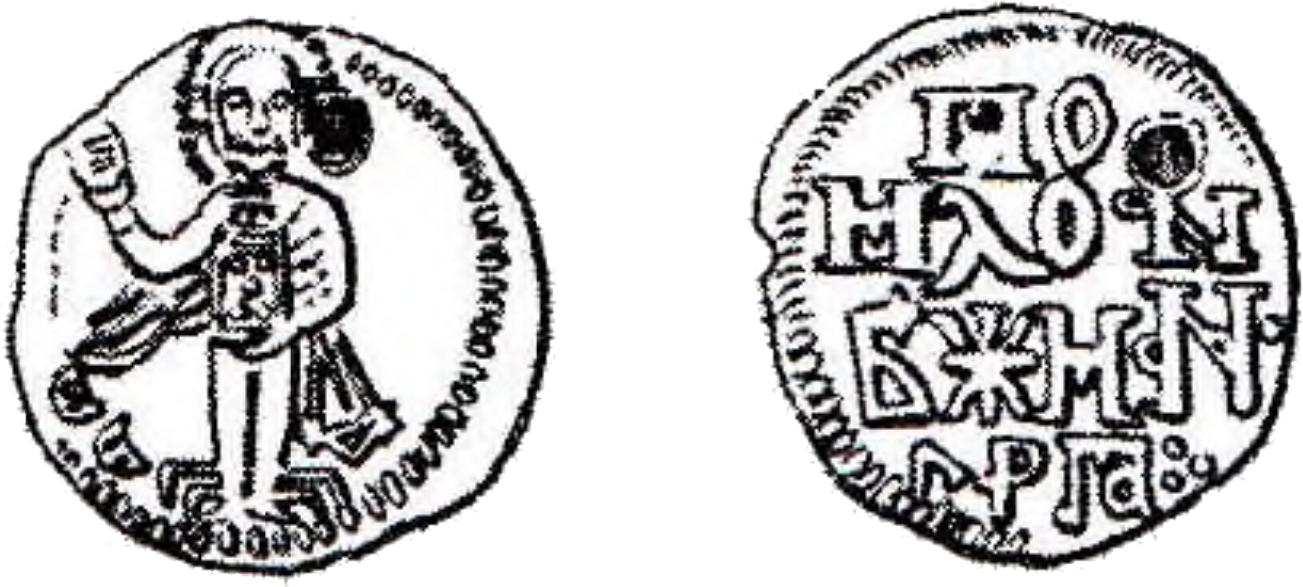
Fourth type of coin minted by Andrea

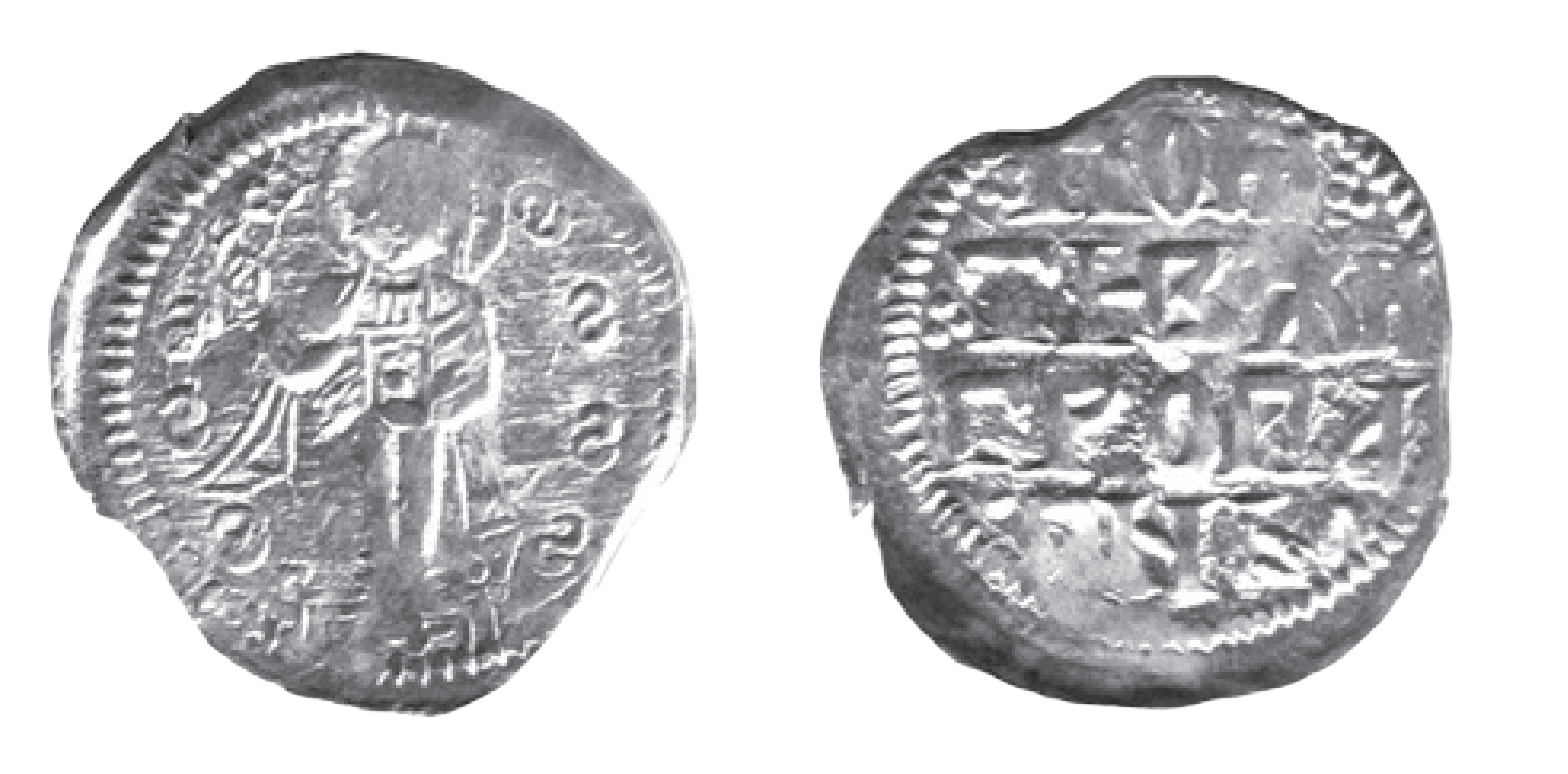

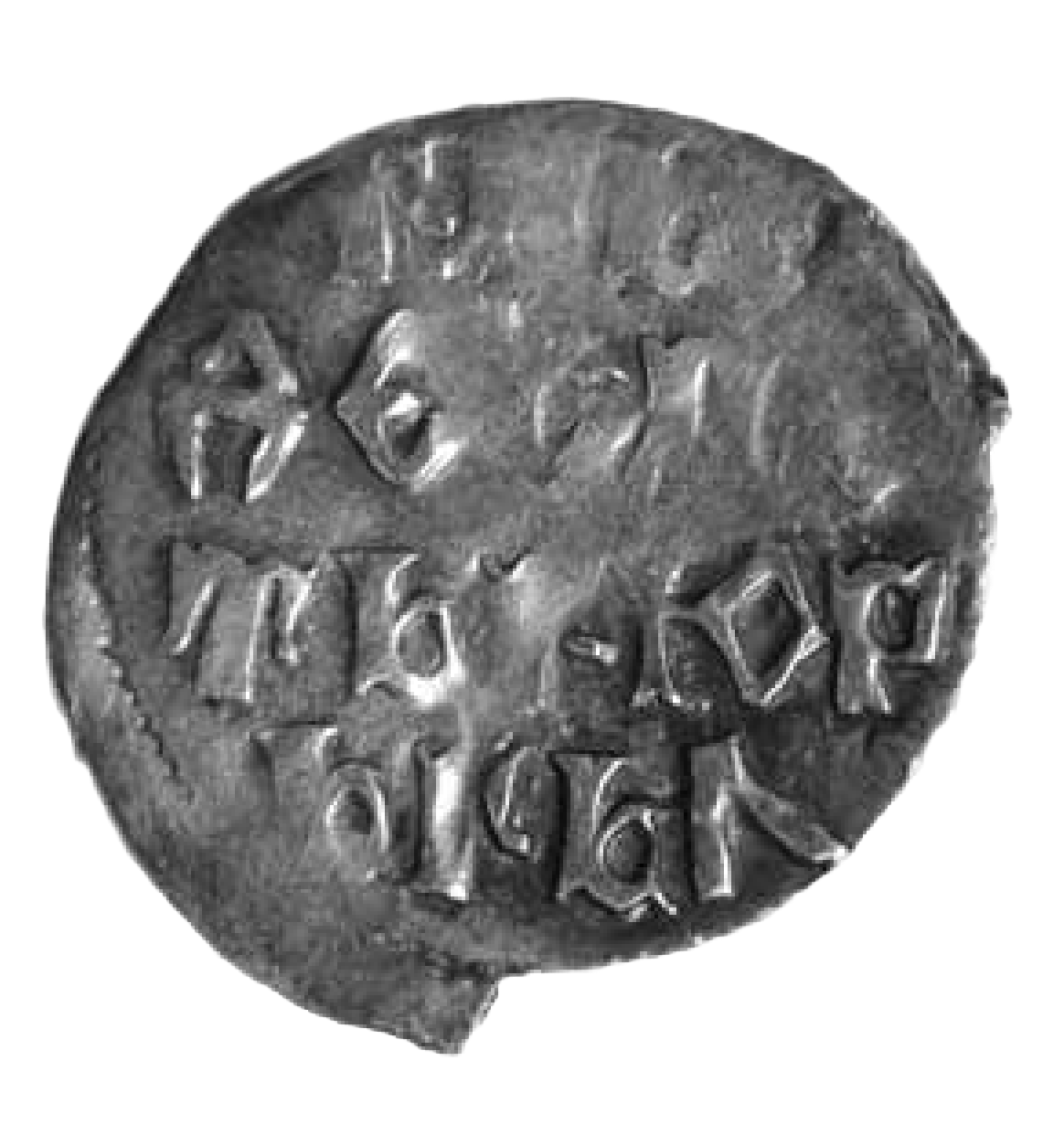
Reverse of Andrea's Coin

== See also ==
- Gropa family
- Medieval Albanian coinage

Regnal titles
Preceded by Prince Marko	Lord of Ohrid fl. 1377–1385	Succeeded by Prince Marko
