= Živojno =

Živojno Живојно
- Village
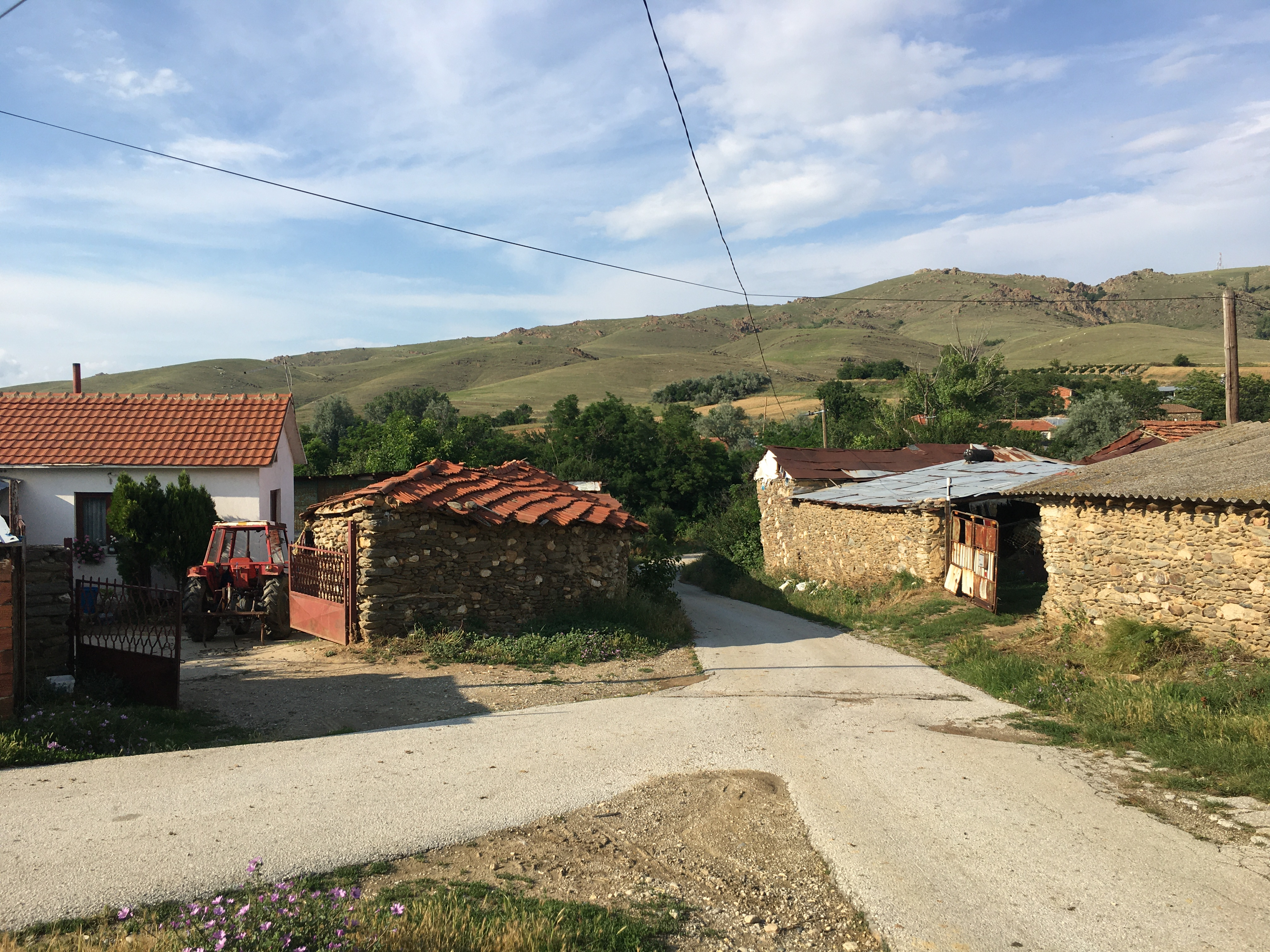
- Houses in the village

- Location within North Macedonia
- Coordinates: 40.905472°N 21.595705°E
- Country: North Macedonia
- Region: Pelagonia
- Municipality: Novaci

Population (2002)
  - Total: 214
- Time zone: UTC+1 (CET)
  - Summer (DST): UTC+2 (CEST)
- Car plates: BT
- Website: .

Živojno (Macedonian: Живојно) is a village in the municipality of Novaci, North Macedonia. It is located close to the Greek border. During the Ottoman Empire, the village was part of the Florina region along with the villages Bach and Germijan, but after the Balkan Wars these villages fell within the borders of the Kingdom of Serbia.

== Demographics ==
According to the 2002 census, the village had a total of 214 inhabitants. Ethnic groups in the village include:

- Macedonians 214
