= Gorno Sonje =

Gorno Sonje Горно Соње
- Village
- Чобанија
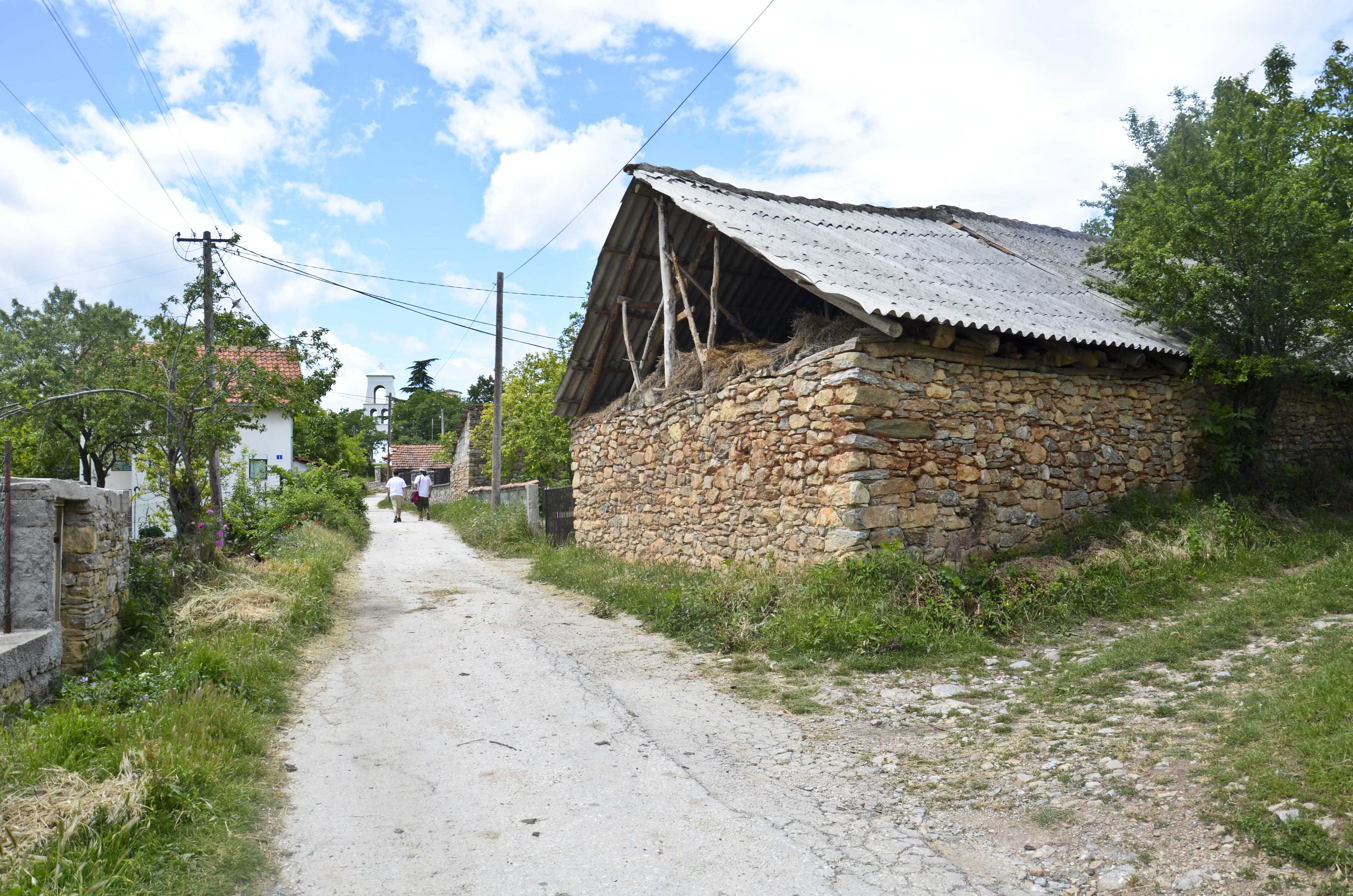

- Location within North Macedonia
- Coordinates: 41.948254°N 21.385527°E
- Country: North Macedonia
- Region: Skopje
- Municipality: Sopište

Population (2021)
  - Total: 362
- Time zone: UTC+1 (CET)
  - Summer (DST): UTC+2 (CEST)
- Website: .

Gorno Sonje (Macedonian: Горно Соње) is a village in the municipality of Sopište, North Macedonia.

== History ==
Within the boundary of Gorno Sonje is the Roman-era archaeological site Stara Češma. The toponym Albanopolis has been found on a funeral inscription. It was discovered in 1931 by Nikola Vulić and its text was analyzed and published in 1982 by Borka Dragojević-Josifovska. The inscription in Latin reads "POSIS MESTYLU F[ILIUS] FL[AVIA] DELVS MVCATI F[ILIA] DOM[O] ALBANOP[OLI] IPSA DELVS". It is translated as "Posis Mestylu, son of Flavia, daughter of Delus Mucati, who comes from Albanopolis". It dates to the end of the 1st century CE or the beginning of the 2nd century CE.

== Demographics ==
As of the 2021 census, Gorno Sonje had 362 residents with the following ethnic composition:

- Macedonians 290
- Persons for whom data are taken from administrative sources 61
- Serbs 7
- Others 4

According to the 2002 census, the village had a total of 219 inhabitants. Ethnic groups in the village include:

- Macedonians 207
- Serbs 9
- Others 3
