= Mrežičko =

Mrežičko Мрежичко
- Village
- Location within North Macedonia
- Country: North Macedonia
- Region: Vardar
- Municipality: Kavadarci

Population (2021)
  - Total: 8
- Time zone: UTC+1 (CET)
  - Summer (DST): UTC+2 (CEST)
- Website: .

Mrežičko (Macedonian: Мрежичко) is a village in the Municipality of Kavadarci, situated in the center of the vinegary region of Tikveš, North Macedonia.

== Demographics ==
According to the statistics of the Bulgarian ethnographer Vasil Kanchov from 1900 the settlement is recorded as Mrežičko and as having 425 Christian Bulgarians, 6 Christian Albanians inhabitants. In the 1905 Austrian ethnographic map of the region of Macedonia, Mrežičko appears as being inhabited by an Exarchist Orthodox Macedonian Slavic majority and an Orthodox Christian Albanian minority.

According to the 2021 census, the village had a total of 8 inhabitants. Ethnic groups in the village include:

- Macedonians 5
- Persons for whom data was taken from administrative sources 3
