= Nikollë Bojaxhiu =

Albanian businessman, benefactor and politician

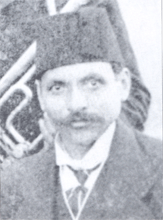
- Born: c. 1874; Prizren, Ottoman Empire (present-day Prizren, Republic of Kosovo)
- Died: 1919; Skoplje, Kingdom of Serbs, Croats and Slovenes (present-day Skopje, North Macedonia)
- Occupation: Businessman
- Spouse: Dranafile (Drana) Bernai Bojaxhiu
- Children: Age; Lazar; Anjezë (Mother Teresa)
- Parent(s): Lazër Bojaxhiu; Çilja Bojaxhiu

Nikollë Bojaxhiu (c. 1874 – 1919), also known as Nikola Bojaxhiu was an Ottoman Albanian businessman, benefactor, politician and the father of the Roman Catholic nun and missionary Mother Teresa. His company constructed the first theatre in Skopje and participated in the development of the railway line connecting Kosovo with Skopje—a project he personally financed.

An active Albanian rights activist, he was also the only Catholic to be elected to the city council of Skopje. Bojaxhiu died in 1919 in obscure circumstances, which led to reports that attributed his death to poisoning by Serbian agents. His children included Lazar, and Anjezë Bojaxhiu (Mother Teresa).

== Life ==
Nikollë was born into a Kosovar Albanian family in 1874 in Prizren. His parents were Lazar and Çilja Bojaxhiu. Bojaxhiu moved to Skopje in the Kosovo Vilayet (present-day North Macedonia) after 1900, where he first worked as a pharmacist and later became a partner in a construction company. He was a polyglot; as well as Albanian he also spoke French, Italian, Bulgarian, Serbo-Croat and Turkish. In the early 1900s, he married Dranafile Bernai with whom he had three children: Aga (b. 1905), Lazar (b. 1908), and Agnes (b. 1910), with the latter becoming later better known as Mother Teresa. Nikollë Bojaxhiu's company constructed the city's first theater and part of the railway line that connected Skopje with the region of Kosovo. He was also the owner of a wholesale food company and the only Roman Catholic member of the city council of Skopje.

On the day of the Albanian Declaration of Independence (November 28, 1912) he hosted a meeting that was attended by Bajram Curri and Hasan Prishtina among others. After the region's incorporation into Serbia, Bojaxhiu joined various Albanian rights political organizations. He died in 1919, a few hours after he returned from a political meeting in Belgrade. Several biographers have attributed his death to poisoning by Serbian agents. The location, purpose, and participants of the meeting remain unknown. His son Lazar considered the theory of poisoning to be a certainty, while his daughter Agnes described it as unconfirmed.

His funeral process was attended by large numbers of people and representatives of all the religious communities. As a sign of respect, that day all school children were given dedicatory handkerchiefs and jewellers' shops remained closed. After his death, his partner appropriated the entirety of their companies' assets and left nothing to his widow, Dranafile, and offspring.
