= Pal Gropa =

Feudal Albanian ruler

Sebastos Paulo Gropa Albanian: Pal Gropa
- Lord of Deabolis and Debar
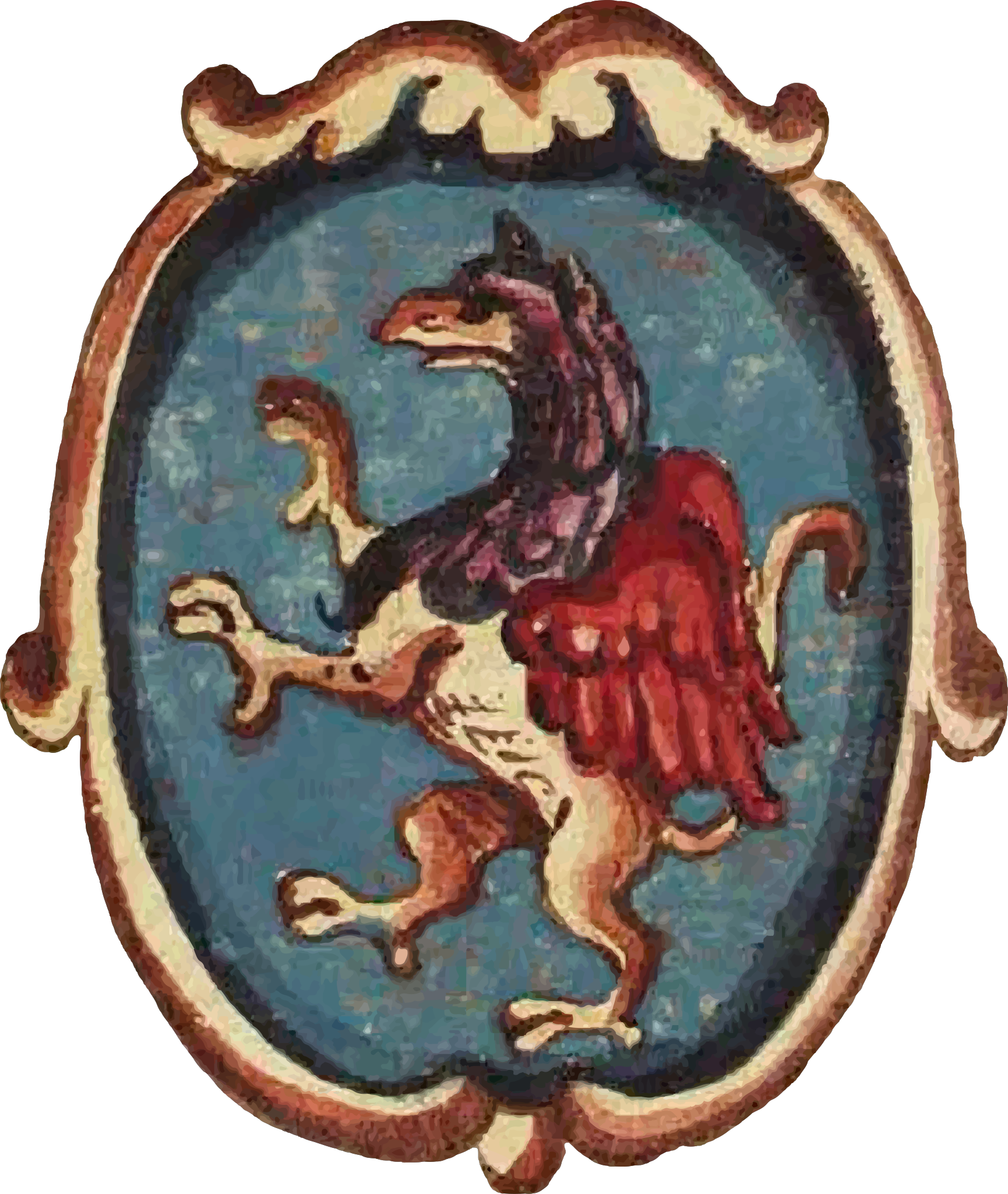
- Coat of arms of the Gropa as depicted in the 1680 catalogue "La Universita delle Insegne Ligustiche Delineate da Gio Andrea Musso"
- Feudalism: Vassal to the Kingdom of Sicily
- Noble family: House of Gropa
- Issue: Possibly father of Teodor I’s wife.

Pal Gropa, also known as Paul or Paulo Gropa, (Pal Gropa) was an Albanian feudal ruler of Ohrid and Dibër from the 13th century and a member of the Gropa family. He held the title of Sebastos.

== Biography ==
In 1273, the Angevin rulers of Albania record that sebastos Pal Gropa was the lord of an extensive mass of territory in Dibër. He was granted privileges on 18 May 1273 by Charles of Anjou; he was assigned seven villages in the Devoll valley and other properties in Ohrid and Debar.

In 1275, Sevast Paul Gropa (Ropa) and Johannes Muzaki presented themselves to Vicar General de Tucu in Durrës, a representative of King Charles of Anjou.

== Bibliography ==
- Lala, Etleva; Jaritz, Gerhard (2008). "Regnum Albaniae and the Papal Curia" (PDF). Central European University.
- Šufflay, Milan (1925). Srbi i Arbanasi: (njihova simbioza u srednjem vijeku). Seminar za arbanasku filologiju.
