= Gropa family =

Albanian noble family

Gropa
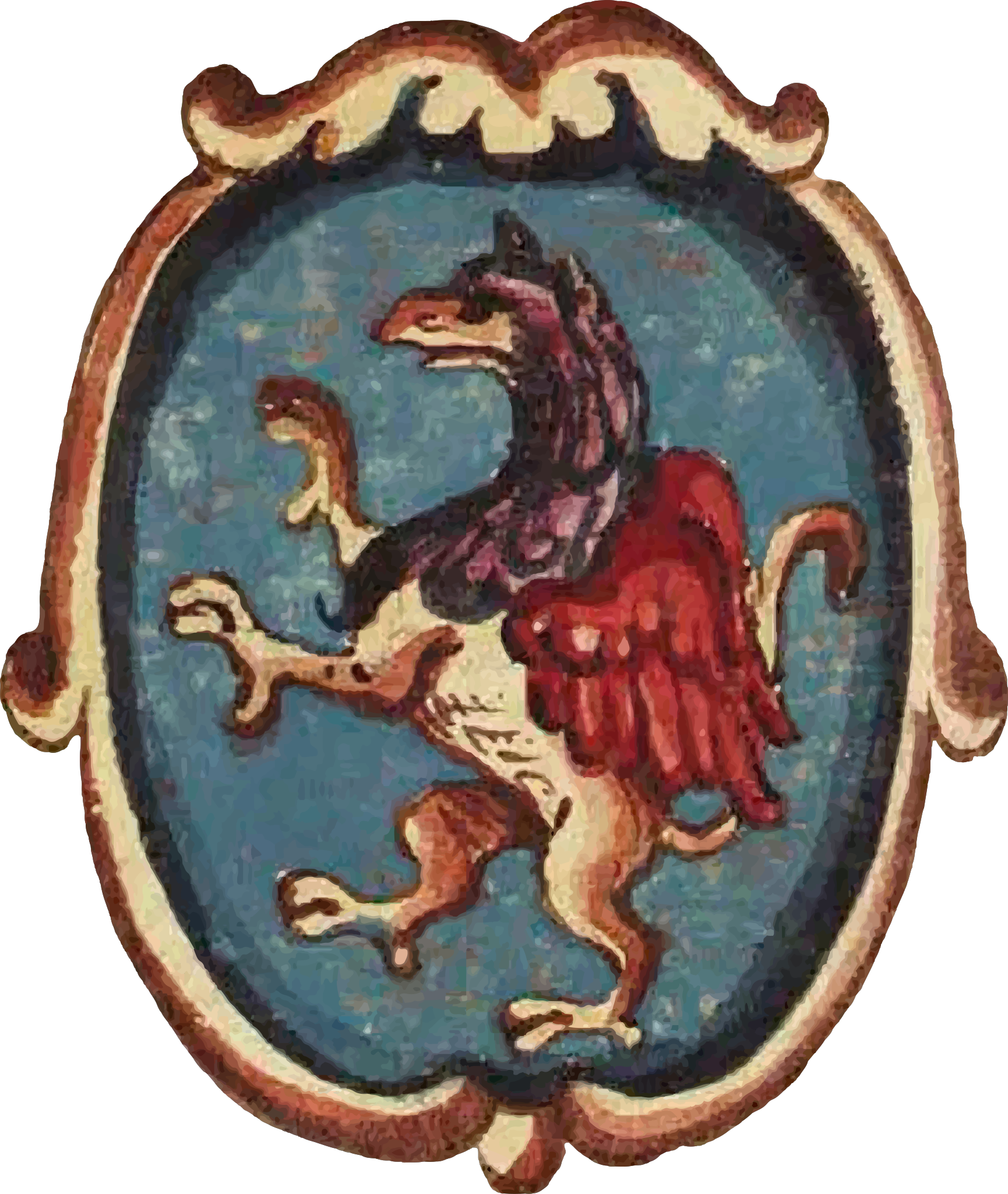
- Coat of arms of the Gropa as depicted in the 1680 catalogue "La Universita delle Insegne Ligustiche Delineate da Gio Andrea Musso" (p.13)
- Country: Kingdom of Sicily (fl. 1273); Serbian Empire (1355-1355); Ally to Mrnjavčević family (1355-1371); Rival of Prince Marko and independent ruler (1371-1395); League of Lezhë (1444-1479)
- Founded: before 1242
- Final ruler: Zacharia Gropa
- Titles: Gospodar (lord)
- Estates: (eastern Albania and western Macedonia); The region between Pogradec, Ohrid and Debar: Ohrid (1377-1385)
- Dissolution: 1467 (emigration to Italy)

The Gropa were a noble Albanian family which ruled the region between Pogradec, Ohrid and Debar from the 12th until the 14th century. In the 13th century members of the Gropa family were thought to be Catholics, but in the 14th century they reverted to Eastern Orthodoxy because of the political relations with the Archbishopric of Ohrid.

== History ==
Domains ruled by the Gropa

At the beginning of the 13th century, Pal Gropa, an Albanian nobleman, held the Byzantine title of Sevast. As part of the Kingdom of Albania, Pal Gropa was given extended privileges by Charles I of Naples on May 18, 1273: "nobili viro sevasto Paulo Gropa »casalia Radicis maioris et Radicis minons, пeс non Cobocheste, Zuadigorica, Sirclani et Craye, Zessizan sitam in valle de Ebu".

A member of Gropa family, Andrea Gropa, ruled the region and the city of Ohrid as an ally of the King of Serbia, Vukašin Mrnjavčević, until his death in 1371. He then became involved in a rivalry with Vukašin's son, Prince Marko. Ruling as an independent ruler since the time of Vukašin, he became de jure independent from Prince Marko in 1371 and was referred to as Župan and Gospodar of Ohrid (Lord of Ochrid). He joined the Albanian ruler and noble Andrea II Muzaka, and managed to take Kostur, Prilep and the entire Dibër region from Marko by that year. During Andrea's reign, the Gropa family forged their own coins. The Gropa family were believed to have taken part in the Balkan coalition of the Battle of Kosovo against the Ottomans.

Zacharia Gropa is mentioned by Athanase Gegaj as one of the military commanders of Skanderbeg's forces. The Gropa family's descendants were located in Sicily at the end of the 15th century, and would later be found all over southern Italy and in Zakynthos in Greece.

== Members ==
- Pal Gropa (fl. 1273), vassal to Charles I of Naples in Kingdom of Albania
- Andrea Gropa (fl. 1377–1385), vassal to Serbian King Vukašin and Marko, later Ottoman Empire
- Zacharia Gropa (fl. 1457), associate of Moisi Dibra.
- Pal II Gropa (fl. 1375), Lord of Ohrid.
- Aidin Gropa, Lord of Vrezhda sometime during the 14th century.
