= Malesia, North Macedonia =

Region in Upper Struga Municipality, North Macedonia

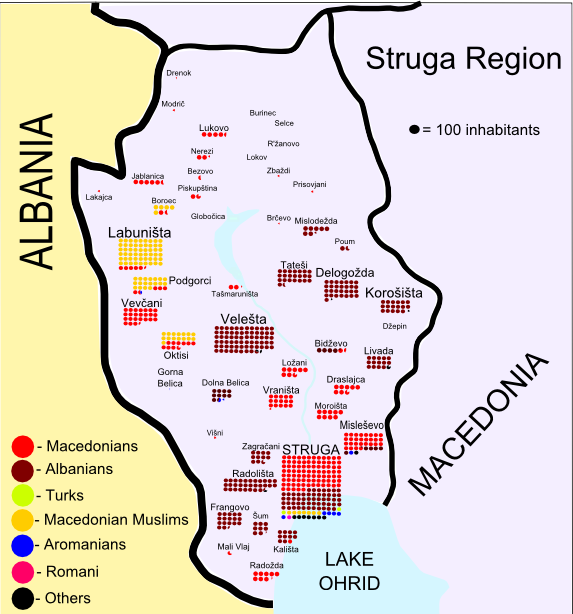
Ethnic composition of settlements in Malesia

Malesia (Macedonian: Малеcија, romanized: Malesija, Albanian: Malësia; also Struga Malesia, Macedonian: Струшка Малесија, romanized: Struška Malesija, Albanian: Malësia e Strugës) is a small region in Upper Struga Municipality, in western North Macedonia, at the Golema River. It is inhabited by Orthodox Christians, as opposed to the settlements to the south, which are Muslim. Burinec and Selce used to be part of the Debar župa. The Karaorman Mountain is situated to the east of Ržanovo. The toponym Malesija is of Albanian origin from the word Malësi meaning a mountainous area or region. During the period between 1960 and 1975, many inhabitants of Malesia migrated to Struga. In a 1903 document by the Cartographic Society of Sofia, the villages of Malesia were all registered with Albanian Orthodox majorities, but nowadays they identify as Macedonians.

According to Bulgarian researchers Vasil Kanchov and Dimitar Mishev, Malesia was populated by Bulgarian excarchists.

It contains the following eight villages:

- Brčevo (Брчево)
- Burinec (Буринец)
- Globočica (Глобочица)
- Lokov (Локов)
- Prisovjani (Присовјани)
- 'Ržanovo, Struga ('Ржаново)
- Selci (Селци)
- Zbaždi (Збажди)

== See also ==
- Malësia

== Sources ==
- Branislav Rusić, Malesija
