= Germijan =

Germijan Гермијан
- Village
- Location within North Macedonia
- Coordinates: 40.917113°N 21.530653°E
- Country: North Macedonia
- Region: Pelagonia
- Municipality: Novaci

Population (2002)
  - Total: 257
- Time zone: UTC+1 (CET)
  - Summer (DST): UTC+2 (CEST)
- Car plates: BT
- Website: .

Germijan (Macedonian: Гермијан) is a village in the municipality of Novaci, North Macedonia. It used to be part of the former municipality of Bač. It is located close to the Greek border.

== Demographics ==
According to the 2002 census, the village had a total of 257 inhabitants. Ethnic groups in the village include:

- Macedonians 251
- Serbs 5
- Others 1
