= St. Andrew (dam) =

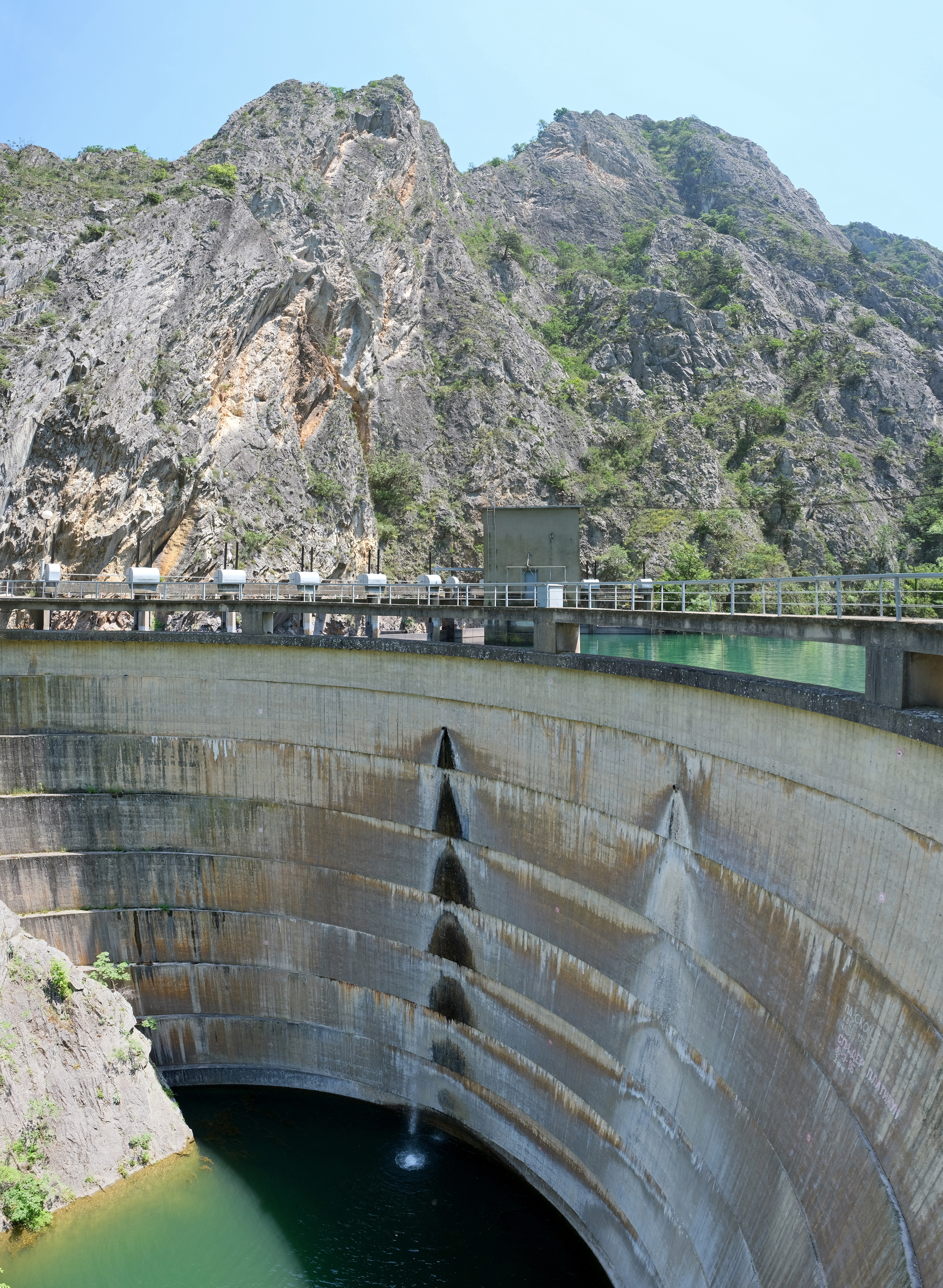
- View of the dam
- Location: Matka
- Opening date: 1938

Dam and spillways
- Type of dam: Concrete arch dam
- Impounds: Тreska
- Height: 29.5 metres (97 ft)
- Length: 64 metres (210 ft)

St. Andrew (Macedonian: Свети Андреја) is a concrete arch dam in Macedonia. It was constructed in 1938 and was as such the first dam built in the country. It is located at the exit of the Treska River from the narrow Matka Gorge near Skopje. It is functionally and aesthetically perfectly integrated into the terrain and was designed by the architect Miladin Pećinar. The construction works were completed in 1938 when the road that today leads from the dam to the monastery church of St. Andrew and the mountain lodge were actually built. Until then, the road to St. Andrew had been extremely difficult and inaccessible. The dam is 29.5 m (97 ft) high, 64 m (210 ft) long, and has a volume of 3,000 square metres (32,000 sq ft). It is constructed with 10 horizontal arches and a frontal spillway with a tunnel discharge on the right bank. It is intended for electricity generation and water accumulation, which then passes through the turbines of the Matka Hydro Power Plant and St. Petka Hydro Power Plant.

The dam is the only one of its kind in the world. It is in the shape of an arch, and the rings in it are independent of each other, so if they break, no disaster can occur. St. Andrew is a school-type power plant because everything is visible in it, down to the impeller, unlike the newer dams, in which all parts are armoured. The dam is deliberately not higher than 30 m (98 ft) so that if the waters rise, St. Andrew's Monastery will not be flooded.

The dam survived two floods. The first one, which blocked its operation for six months, occurred in 1962. The lake was then blocked by debris from fallen trees. After the second flood, which occurred in 1979, the employees managed to sort out the chaos and put the dam back into operation in seven days.
