= St. Nicholas Šiševski Monastery =

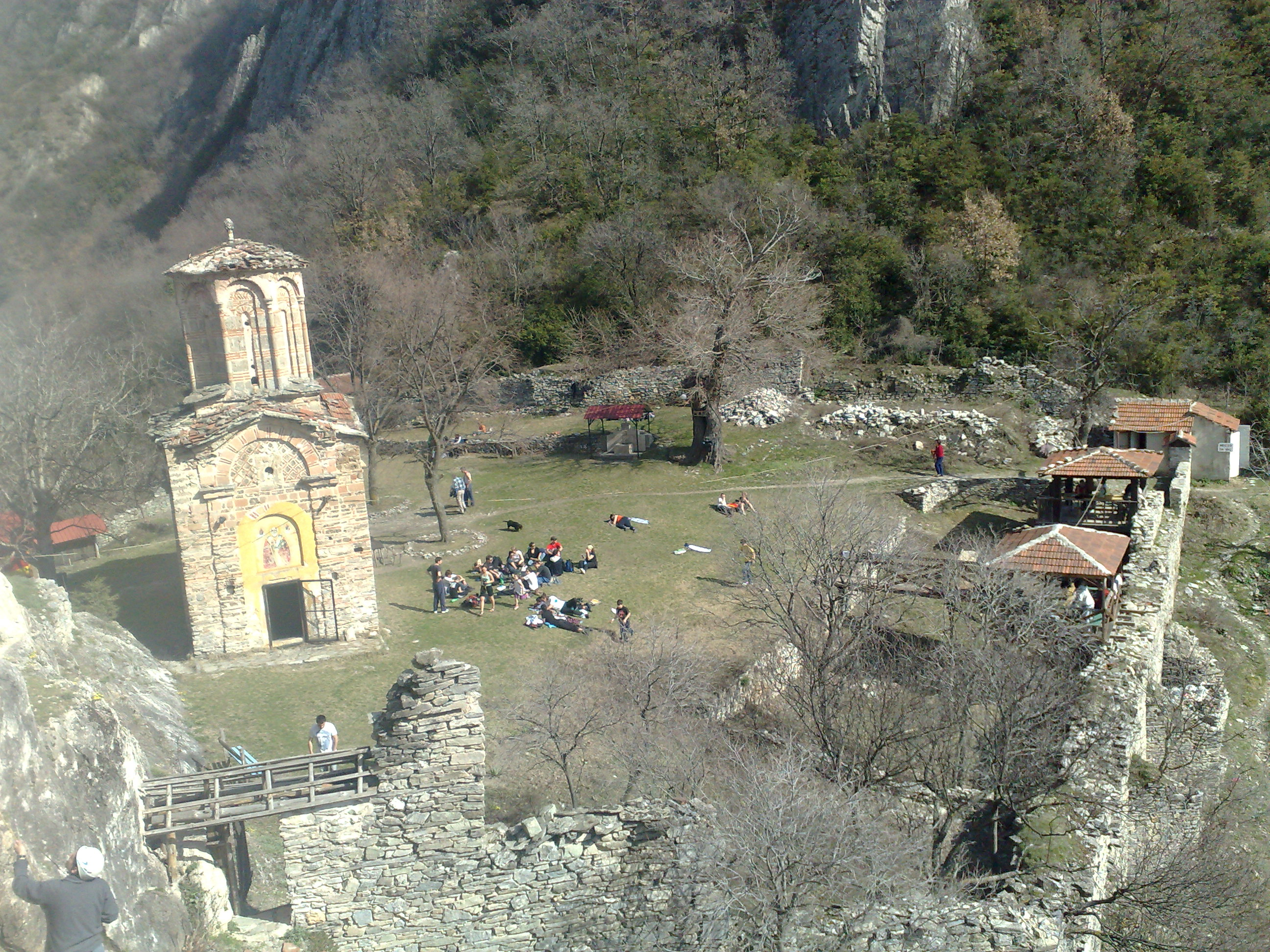
- View of St. Nicholas Šiševski Monastery from the cliffs above Lake Matka
- St. Nicholas Šiševski Monastery
- 41°57′0″N 21°18′0″E
- Location: Šiševo
- Country: Macedonia

History
- Founded: 1345 (14th century)
- Founder: Prince Marko (presumably)
- Dedication: Saint Nicholas

Administration
- District: Municipality of Saraj
- Diocese: Skopje

St. Nicholas Šiševski Monastery is a Macedonian Orthodox Christian medieval monastery located near the village of Šiševo, high above the cliffs overlooking the canyon of the Treska River in North Macedonia.

== Location ==
St. Nicholas Šiševski Monastery is located at about 480 m above sea level high on a terraced slope of mount Vodno, 160 m above the right bank of the artificial lake Matka on the Treska River. The terrain is inaccessible to motor vehicles and mountain bikes and can only be reached on foot from three directions: from the bridge over the Treska River near the kayaking area close to the Matka Monastery in Dolna Matka (a half-hour walk); from the village of Šiševo (1 hour); and from the summit of Mount Vodno (2 hours and 30 minutes). It is located 18 km away from the city of Skopje, and approximately 3 km from the village of Šiševo. On the opposite side of the monastery, below the lake, there is a splendid view of the famous church, St. Andrew's Monastery.

== History ==
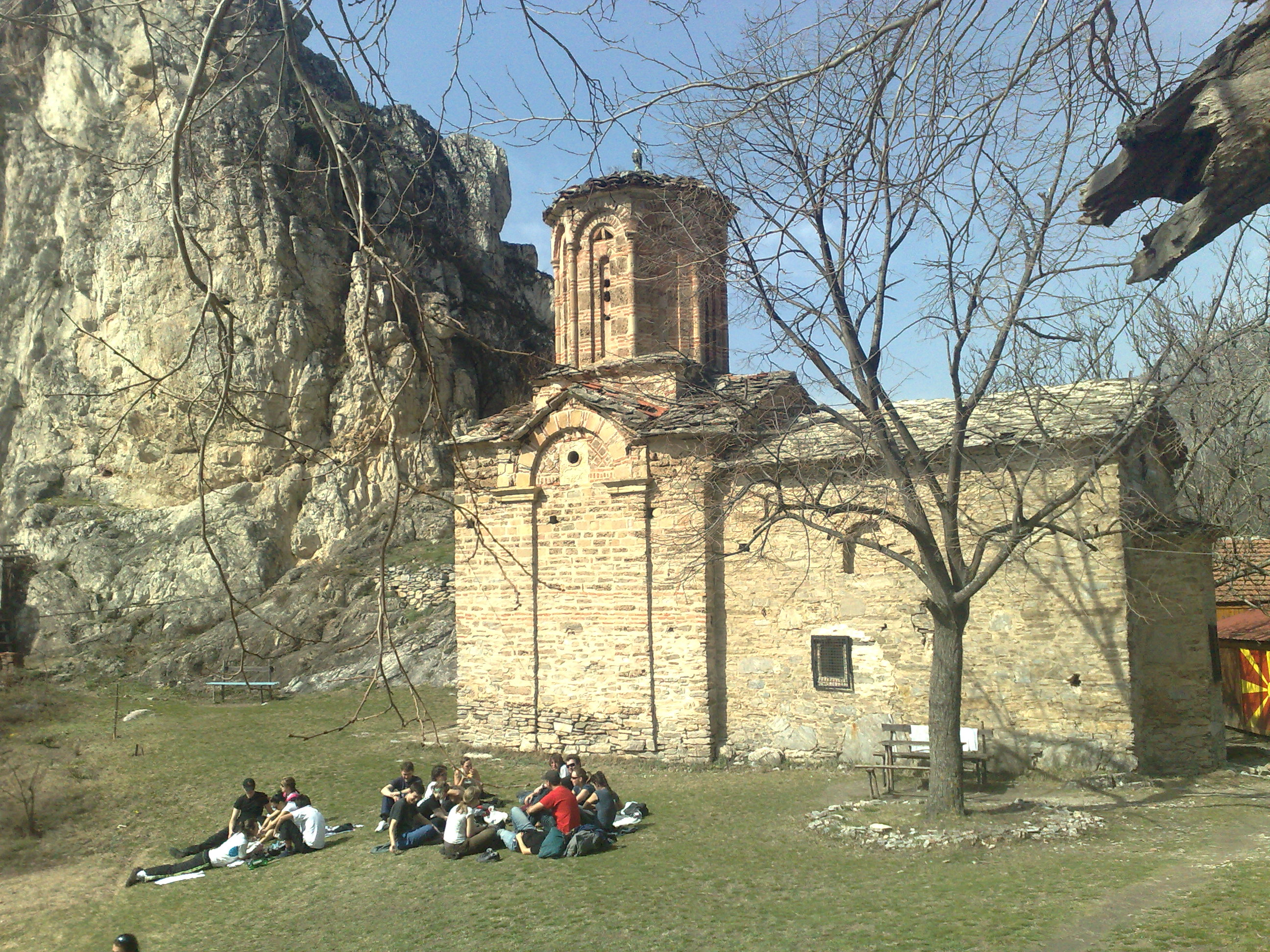
A close-up view of the monastery church of St. Nicholas

The exact date of the construction of the monastery church, dedicated to St. Nicholas, is unknown. However, there is information that the church was built or renovated in 1345 by the priest Nenad and other benefactors. A transcript of a monastery document mentions that King Marko assisted in the construction and painting of the older church, so he can be credited as a benefactor. Considering this information, as well as the fact that the benefactor of the nearby church across the lake, dedicated to St. Andrew, was Marko's brother, Andrijaš, it can be concluded that this monastery dates back to the second half of the 14th century. The exact identity of the benefactor of the new church is not known, but it is assumed that Skopje's Metropolitan Simeon personally contributed to its construction.

By the mid-15th century, it is mentioned that there was only one monk in the monastery church. Until the end of the 15th century and throughout the entire 14th century, there are no records of the monastery's life. Sometime in the first half of the 17th century, a narthex was added to the western side of the church in the form of a narrow inscribed cross with a dome supported by consoles.

From the later history of the monastery, the Macedonian enlightener Yordan Hadzhikonstantinov-Dzhinot, in one of his writings in the "Tsarigradski Vesnik" (dated November 20, 1854), noted that in 1844 the Albanians destroyed and burned all the buildings except the monastery church.

== Construction and painting of frescos ==
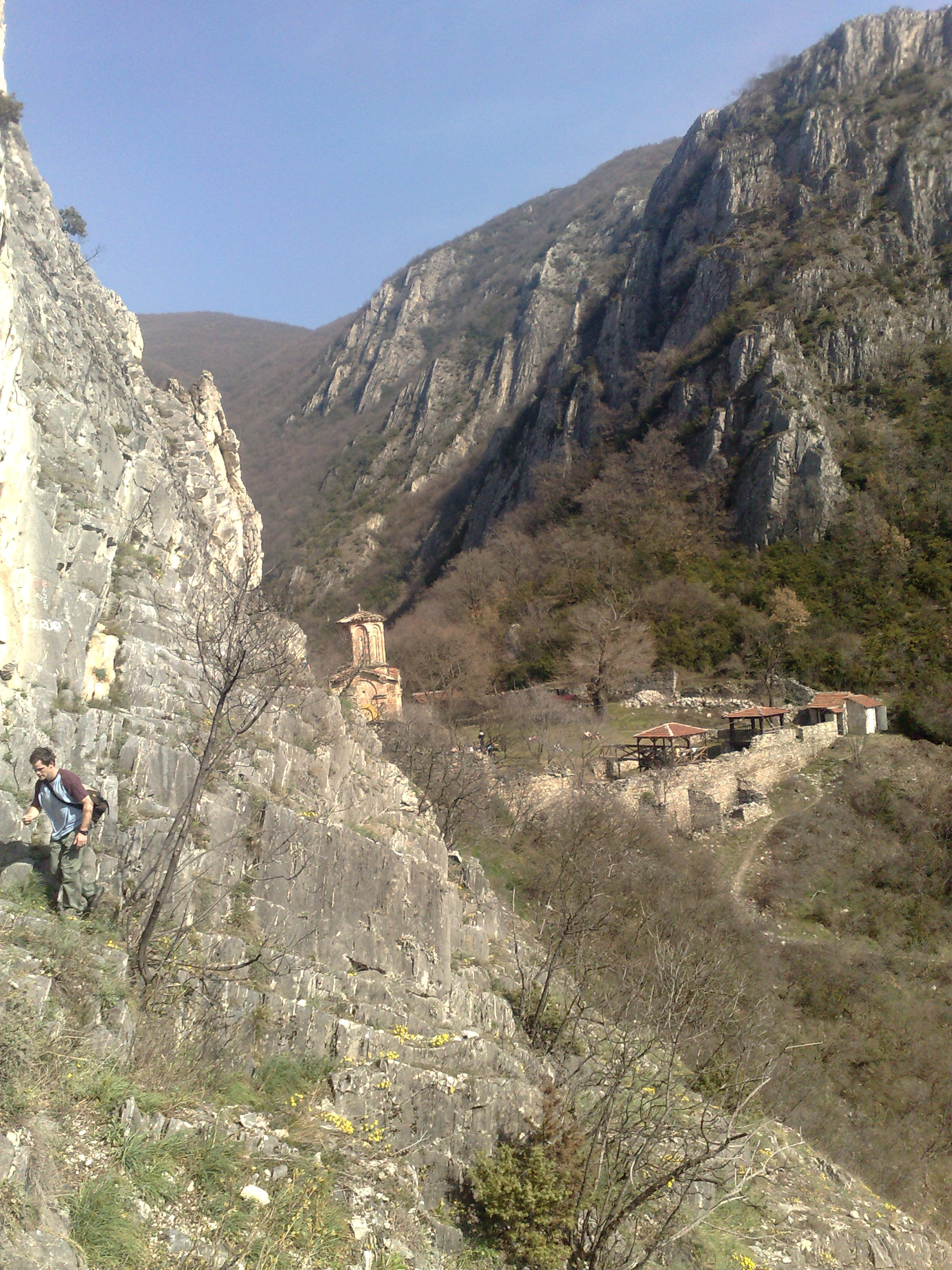
A distant view of the St. Nicholas Šiševski Monastery with its surroundings

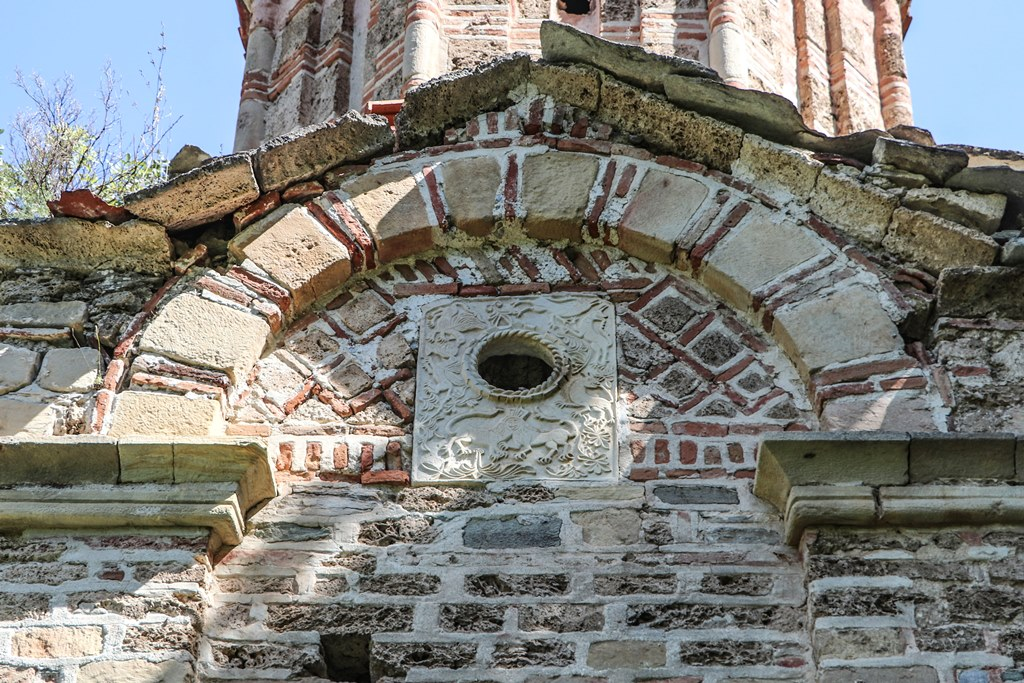
Oculus of Šiševo Monastery

The monastery church consists of two structures. The older original building is a single-nave church with a triconch apse and a semicircular vault. The western part is a compact inscribed cross made of stone and brick, and its facades are adorned with pilasters and blind arcades. This church has a slender octagonal dome and currently serves as a narthex. Above the entrance of the church, there is a large fresco depicting St. Nicholas, the patron saint of the church. High on the central section of the narthex, framed by an arch, there is an oculus, surrounded by a rectangular plaque executed in low-relief. The oculus is outlined by a cable motif. The plaque, which encompasses vegetal and zoomorphic imagery, is dominated by a twin-figured crowned lion King.

The church of St. Nicholas has two layers of frescoes. The old frescoes, dating from the 14th century, are partially revealed beneath the frescoes from the 17th century. Among the old frescoes, the figures of four holy fathers can be seen on the northern and southern walls of the altar, as well as two holy warriors in the naos. These are the holy warriors George and Demetrius, dressed in contemporary royal garments with tall caps, similar to those in the Heavenly Court of the Marko's Monastery. Based on the known frescoes from the first layer, it seems that they were created by two painters belonging to the tribal-monastic group of painters from the second half of the 14th century, identified within the territory of the Skopje Metropolis.

The frescoes from 1630, located in the second church, specifically in the narthex, are very well preserved. The lower zone depicts individual saints, above them are scenes from the life of St. Nicholas, and in the upper zones are scenes of miracles and sufferings of Jesus Christ. The frescoes from 1630 exhibit all the characteristics of this period - dominance of drawing, confident and accurate lines, narrative scenes, compositional richness, limited color palette, and a predominant reddish-brown color.

An interesting aspect is the presence of graffiti with names and surnames of visitors to the monastery who signed the frescoes during their visits from 1860 to 1924.

Among the remnants of the former monastery complexes, the remains of foundations are visible to the south and east of the church, where summer houses have been built, providing a magnificent view of St. Andrew Church.

== See also ==
- Matka Canyon
