= Matka (lake) =

Artificial lake in Macedonia

- Матка (Macedonian)
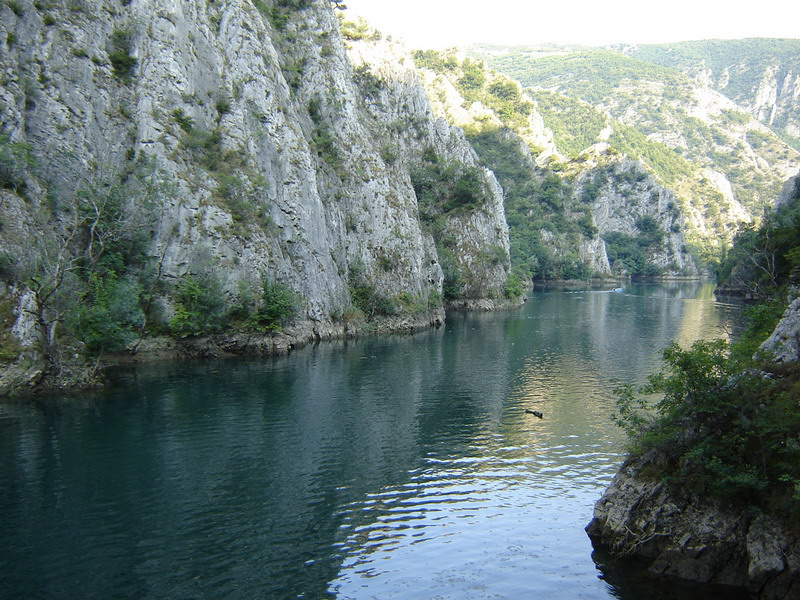
- Lake Matka
- Interactive map of Matka
- Coordinates: 41°57′08″N 21°17′56″E
- Type: artificial
- Primary inflows: Тreska
- Max. length: 7 kilometres (4.3 mi)
- Max. width: 120 metres (390 ft)
- Surface area: 0.25 square kilometres (0.097 sq mi)

Matka is the oldest artificial lake in North Macedonia, with its reservoir being built in 1938. It was created by damming the Treska River with the dam of St. Andrew and forming an artificial reservoir in the Matka Canyon.

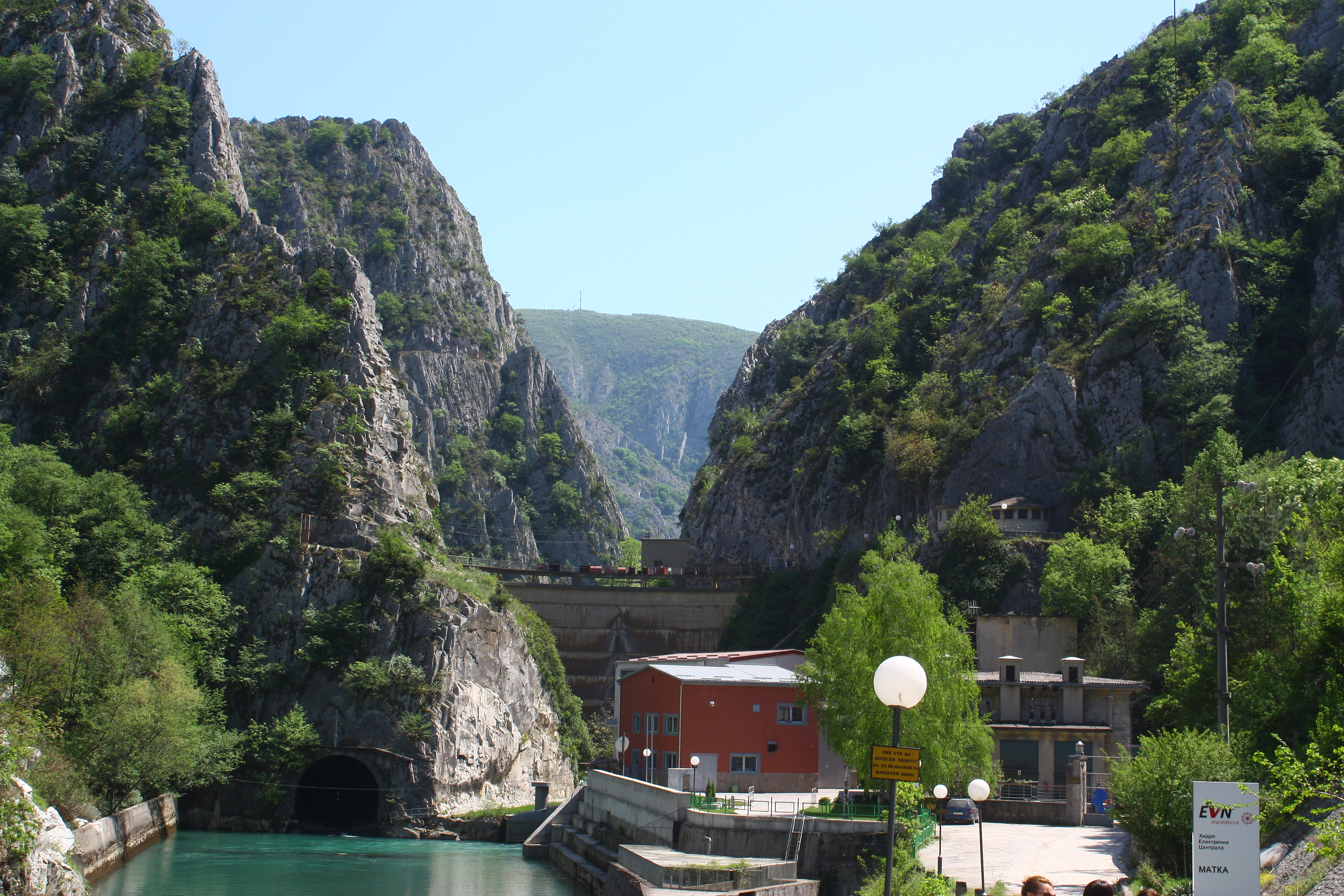
The dam of the lake and the Matka Hydroelectric Power Plant

The water from the lake is used for hydroelectric power generation as well as irrigation of the surrounding villages. The lake is also stocked with fish and is frequently used for recreational fishing. Within the lake, there is the underwater cave called Vrelo, one of the deepest underwater caves in Europe, with a depth of over 203 metres (666 ft).
