= Šiševo =

Šiševo Шишево Shishovë
- Village
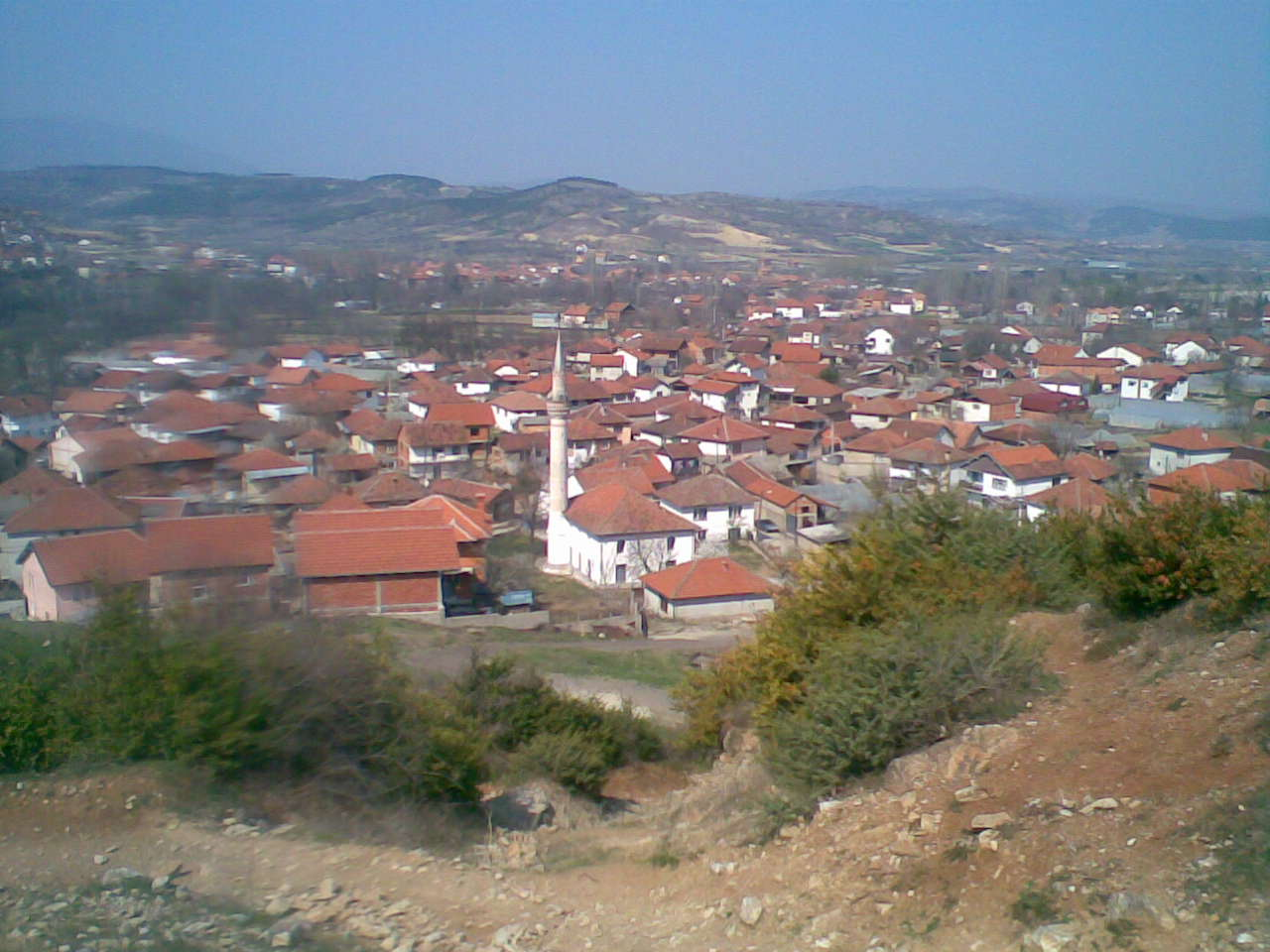

- Location within North Macedonia
- Coordinates: 41°59′N 21°19′E
- Country: North Macedonia
- Region: Skopje
- Municipality: Saraj

Population (2021)
  - Total: 3,958
- Time zone: UTC+1 (CET)
  - Summer (DST): UTC+2 (CEST)
- Car plates: SK
- Website: .

Šiševo (Macedonian: Шишево, Albanian: Shishovë) is a village in the municipality of Saraj, North Macedonia.

== Demographics ==
According to the 2021 census, the village had a total of 3,958 inhabitants. Ethnic groups in the village include:

- Albanians 3.294
- Macedonians 505
- Serbs 3
- Bosniaks 2
- Turks 2
- Romani 87
- Vlachs 4
- Others 61

Year	Macedonian	Albanian	Turks	Romani	Vlachs	Serbs	Bosniaks	Others	Total
2002	583	2.776	1	1	...	3	3	9	3.376
2021	505	3.294	2	87	4	3	2	61	3.958

== Sports ==
Local football club MFK Treska was taken over by Makedonija Gjorče Petrov's head office and subsequently changed its name into Makedonija Gjorče Petrov 1932 in early 2012.

== See also ==
- St. Nicholas Šiševski Monastery
