= Dobra Voda (mountain) =

Mountain in North Macedonia

Coordinates: 40°54′56″N 21°09′58″E

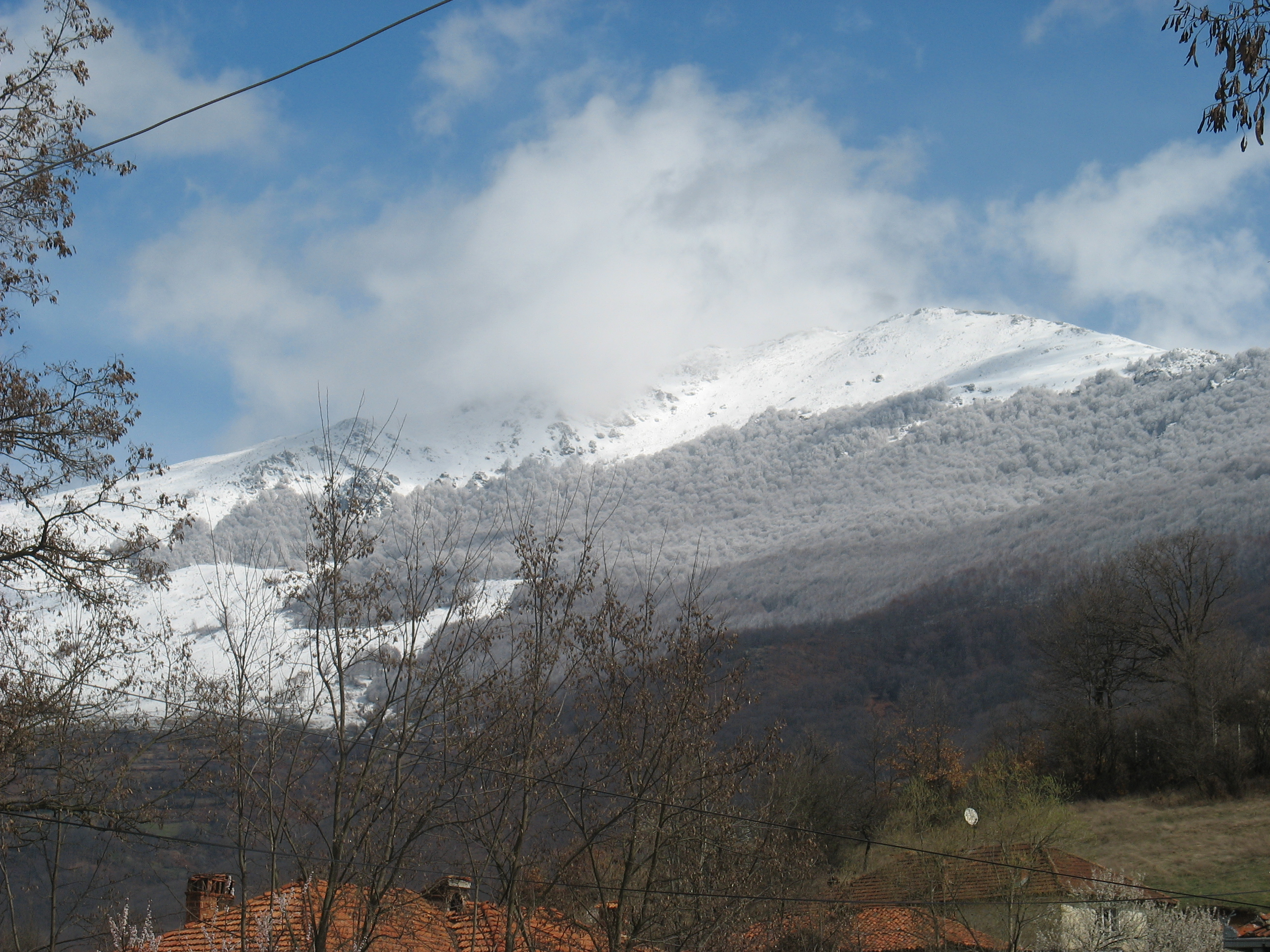
- Dobra Voda viewed from the nearby village of Popojan

Highest point
- Elevation: 2,062 m (6,765 ft)

Geography
- Location: North Macedonia
- Parent range: Čeloica

Dobra Voda (Macedonian Cyrillic: Добра Вода, Albanian Ujmir) is a mountain near the town of Kičevo in North Macedonia. It is the highest peak of the Čeloica mountain range, at 2062 metres above the sea level. Due to tectonic movements, the height of this peak and surrounding mountains continues to rise. This is actually why North Macedonia experiences moderate earthquakes around this region. The name translated literally means good water.

From the top of this peak it is possible to view many surrounding towns - Gostivar, Kičevo, Tetovo - and nearby villages. The main sources of the Treska river are placed within the Čeloica mountain range.

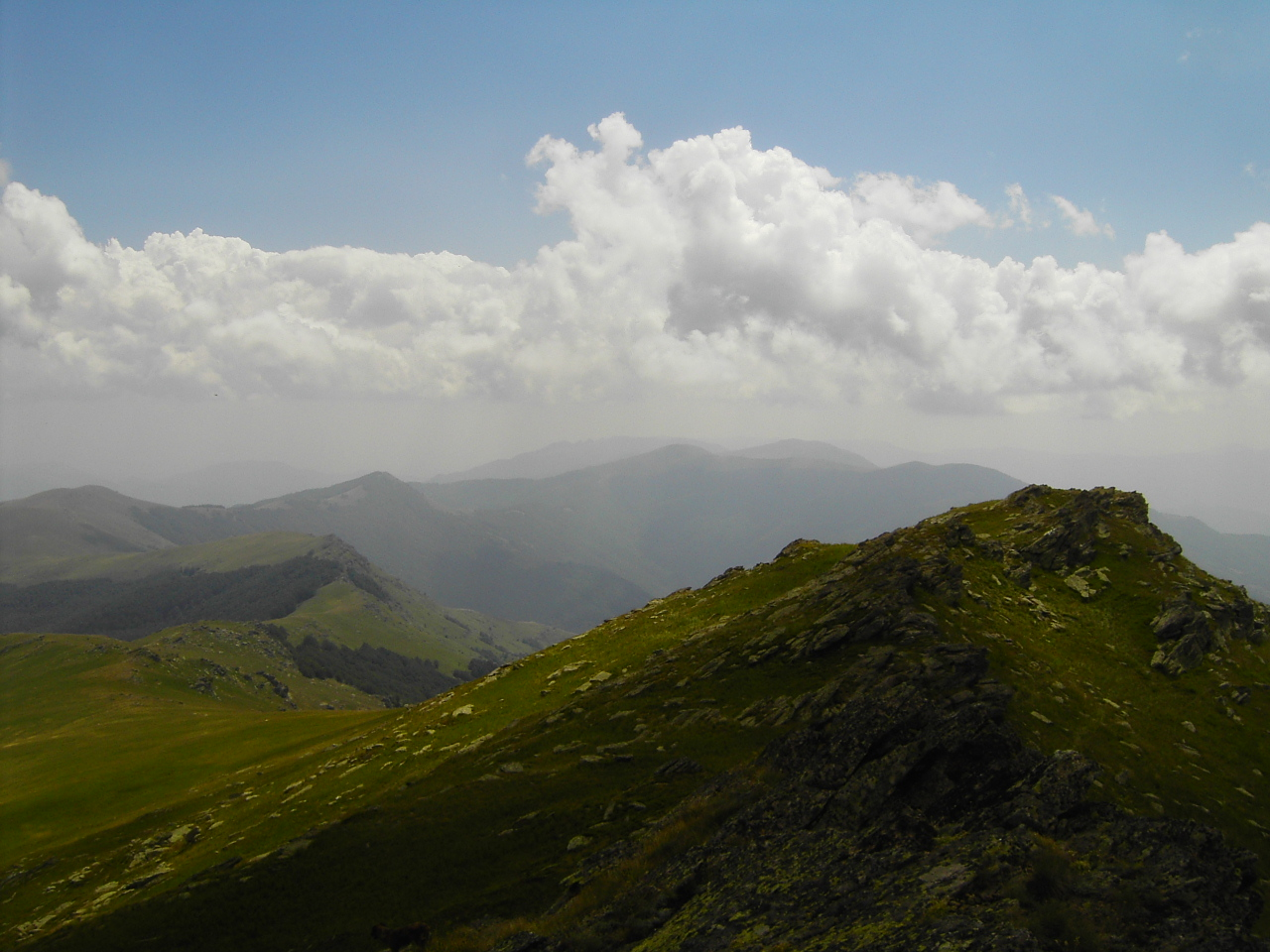
The peak looking east to Čeloica mountain.

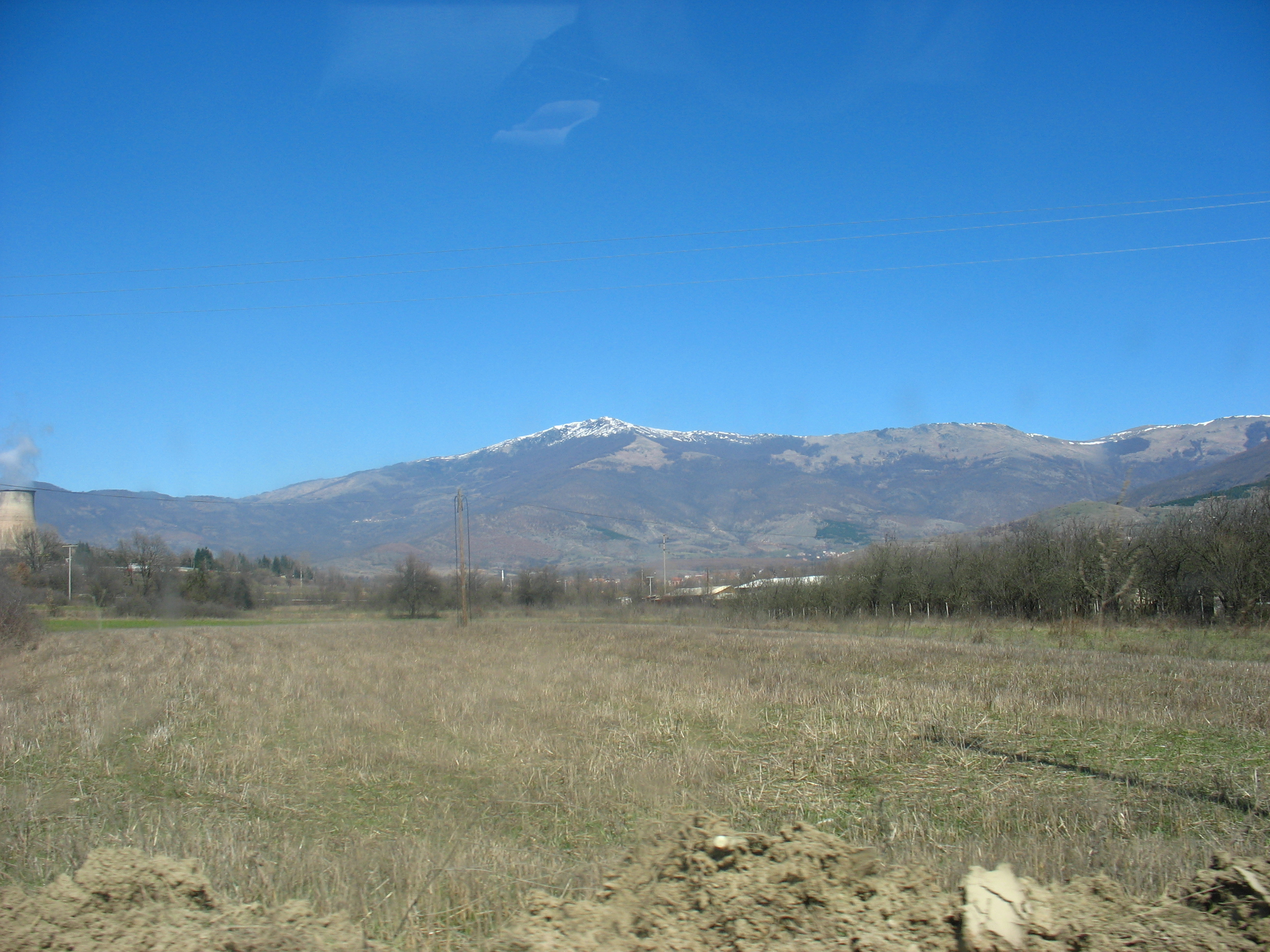
Viewed from the TE Oslomej.
