= Čeloica =

Mountain in North Macedonia

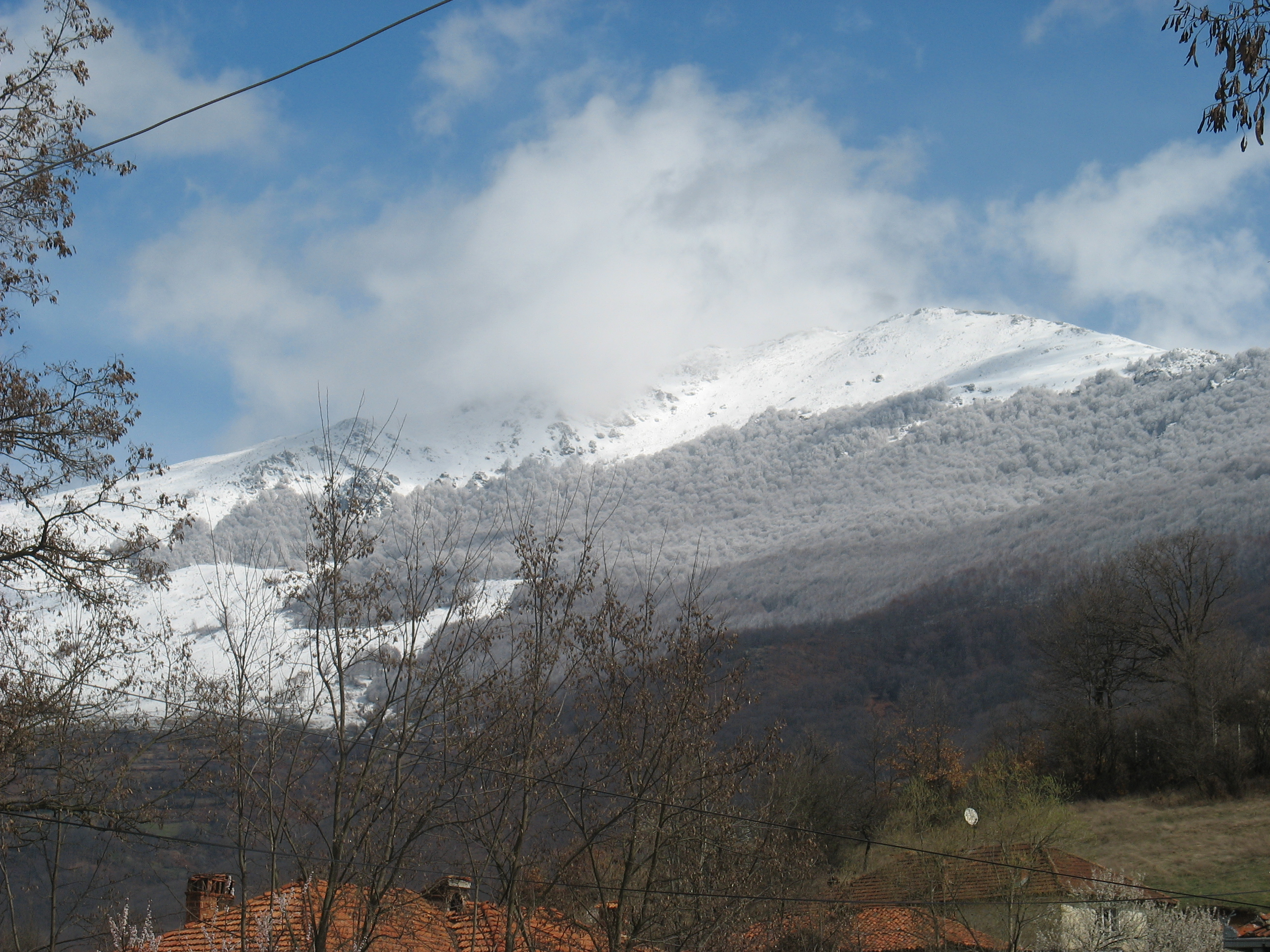
Dobra Voda viewed from the nearby village of Popojan

Čeloica Mountain, (Macedonian: Челоица; Albanian: Çeloicë) often called Dobra Voda (after its highest peak), is part of the mountain range in North Macedonia, including Osoj, Suva Gora and Pesjak mountains, that lie in a north–south orientation. Its high point, Dobra Voda, stands 2062 meters above sea level. It is rarely visited, with no tourist facilities. Its only structures are a shelter built by the Korab mountaineering club in the village of Zelezna Reka (Iron River), and one at the monastery of St. Nicola.
