= St. Andrew's Monastery (Matka) =

Monastery in Saraj, North Macedonia

Monastery of St. Andrew
- Манастир „Св. Андреја“
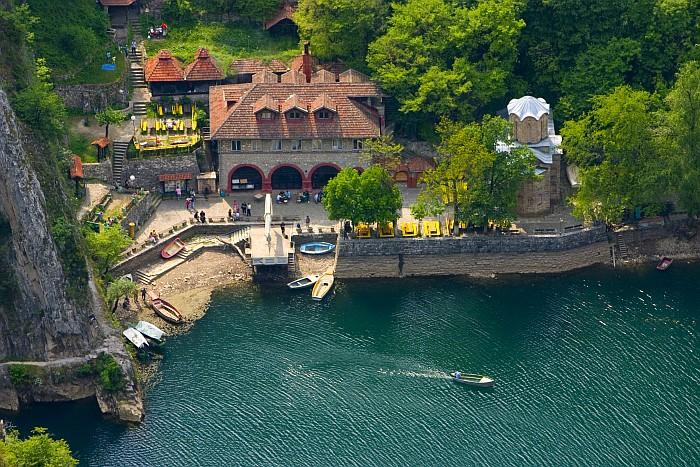
- View of the monastery

- Location within North Macedonia

Religion
- Affiliation: Orthodoxy

Location
- Location: Municipality of Saraj, Skopje, North Macedonia
- Interactive map of Monastery of St. Andrew
- Coordinates: 41.9527°N 21.2981°E

Architecture
- Type: Monastery
- Style: Byzantine architecture
- Established: 14th century
- Completed: 16th century

Saint Andrew's Monastery (Macedonian: Манастир „Св. Андреја“) is located in the Municipality of Saraj, in the western part of Mount Vodno, North Macedonia. Situated next to the Treska River, it is found before the dam that created Lake Matka, approximately 17 kilometres (11 mi) southwest of Skopje. The monastery was founded in 1389 by Andrijaš, one of the two sons of King Vukašin. Nestled among steep and high cliffs, it is one of the few monasteries where most of the inscriptions from the time of its construction and painting have been preserved. It is dedicated to the Apostle Andrew.

The monastery, standing in the midst of the Treska Gorge, on a small natural platform near the river, encompasses both monastic buildings and a church. The church exhibits a typical Byzantine style, featuring a cross plan and a trefoil apse. The northern and southern trefoils serve as choirs, while the eastern trefoil functions as the altar apse. The exterior of the church is adorned with two rows of semicircular niches, enhancing its visual appeal. Additionally, there is a porch that was added to the church in the mid-16th century.

Within the relatively small church, an abundance of frescoes can be found. These frescoes are divided into three sections. The lower part depicts Archangels Michael and Gabriel, St. Demetrius, St. George, the Virgin Mary, and the Apostles. The middle part showcases various episodes from the life of Christ, notably the Passion. In the upper part, located in the tambour of the dome, Christ and his Apostles are depicted once again. The frescos were painted by Metropolitan Jovan, monk Makarij, and monk Grigoriy. Their work deviates from traditional iconographic schemes, presenting clearer and more relatable compositions. Of particular interest is the composition "Prayer on the Mount of Olives," which exhibits their skillful use of perspective.

== Gallery ==
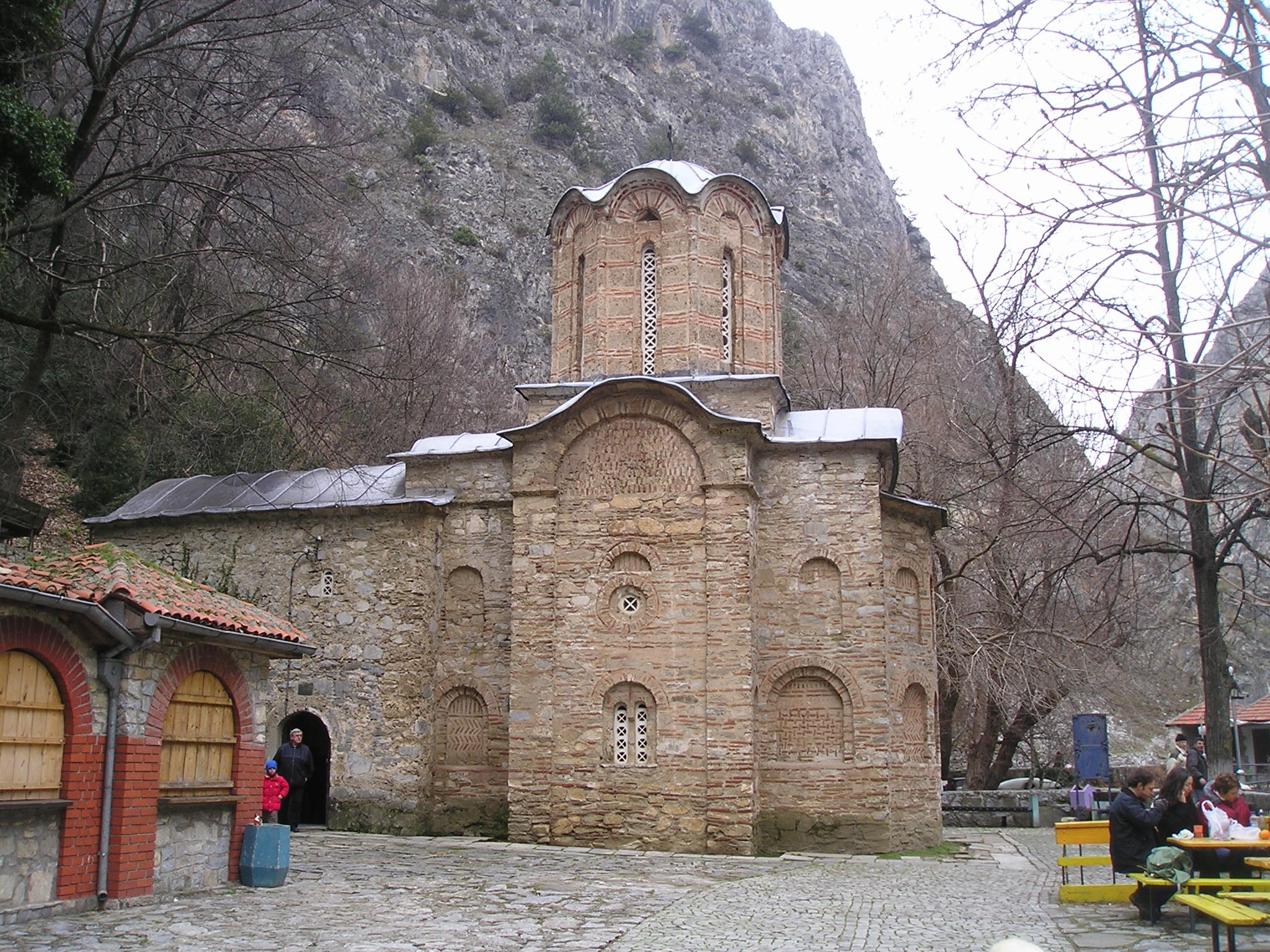
The church

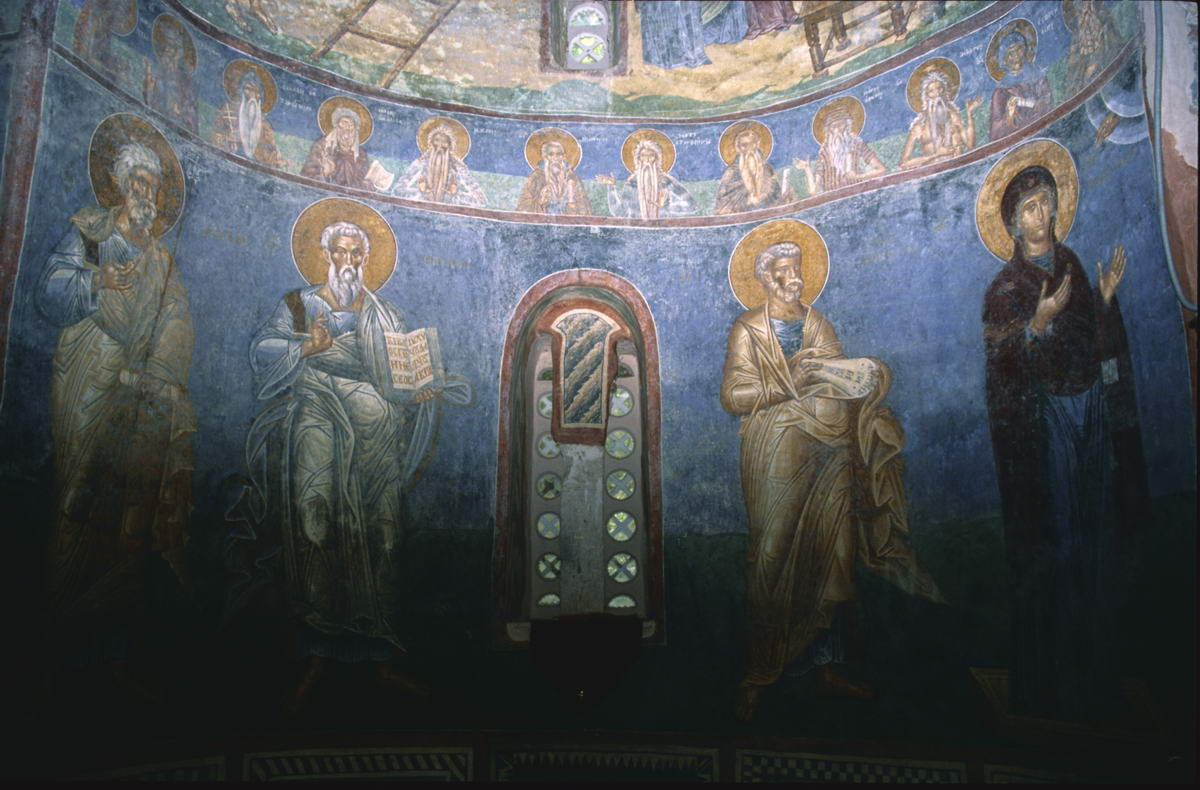
Frescoes in the apse

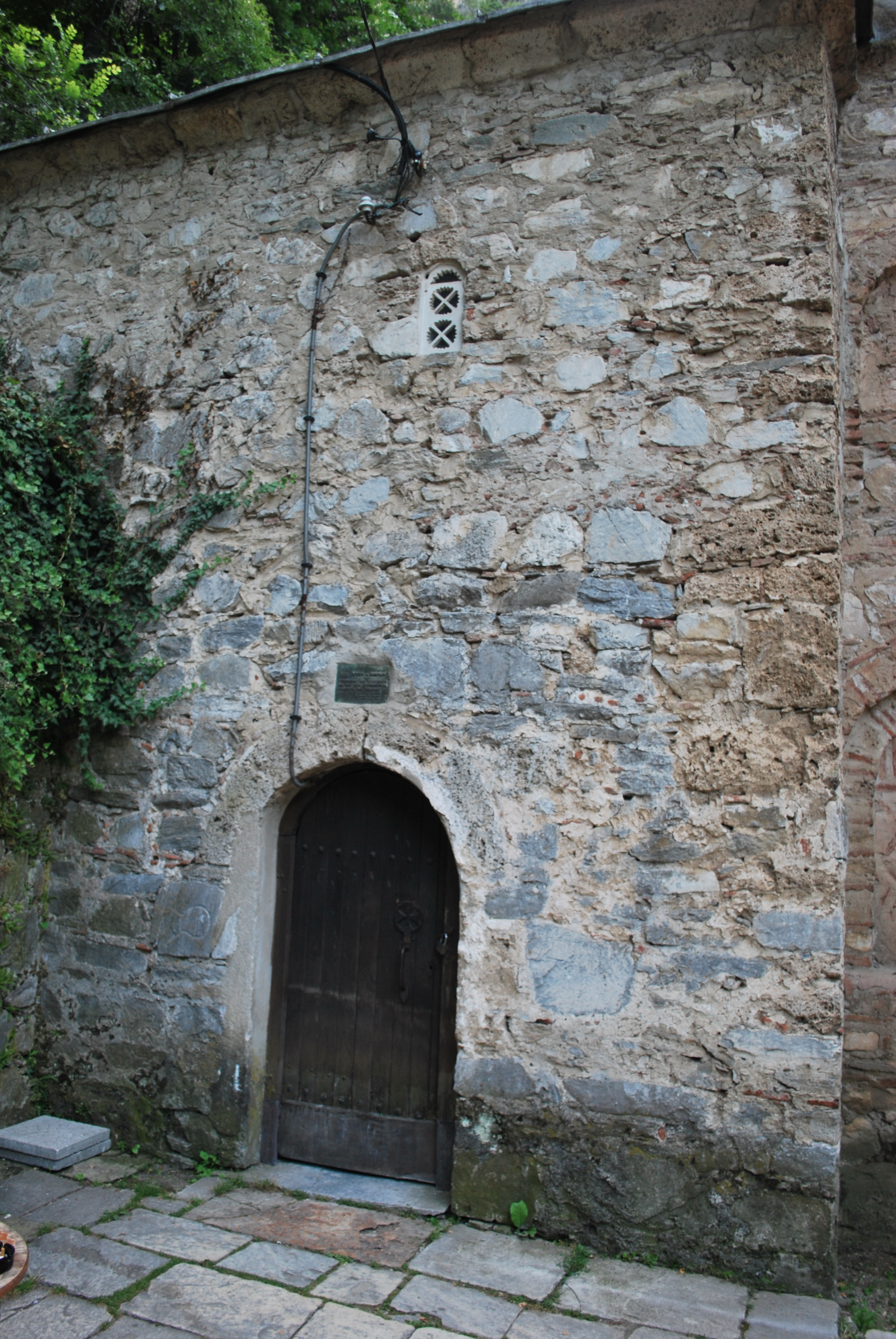
The church porch

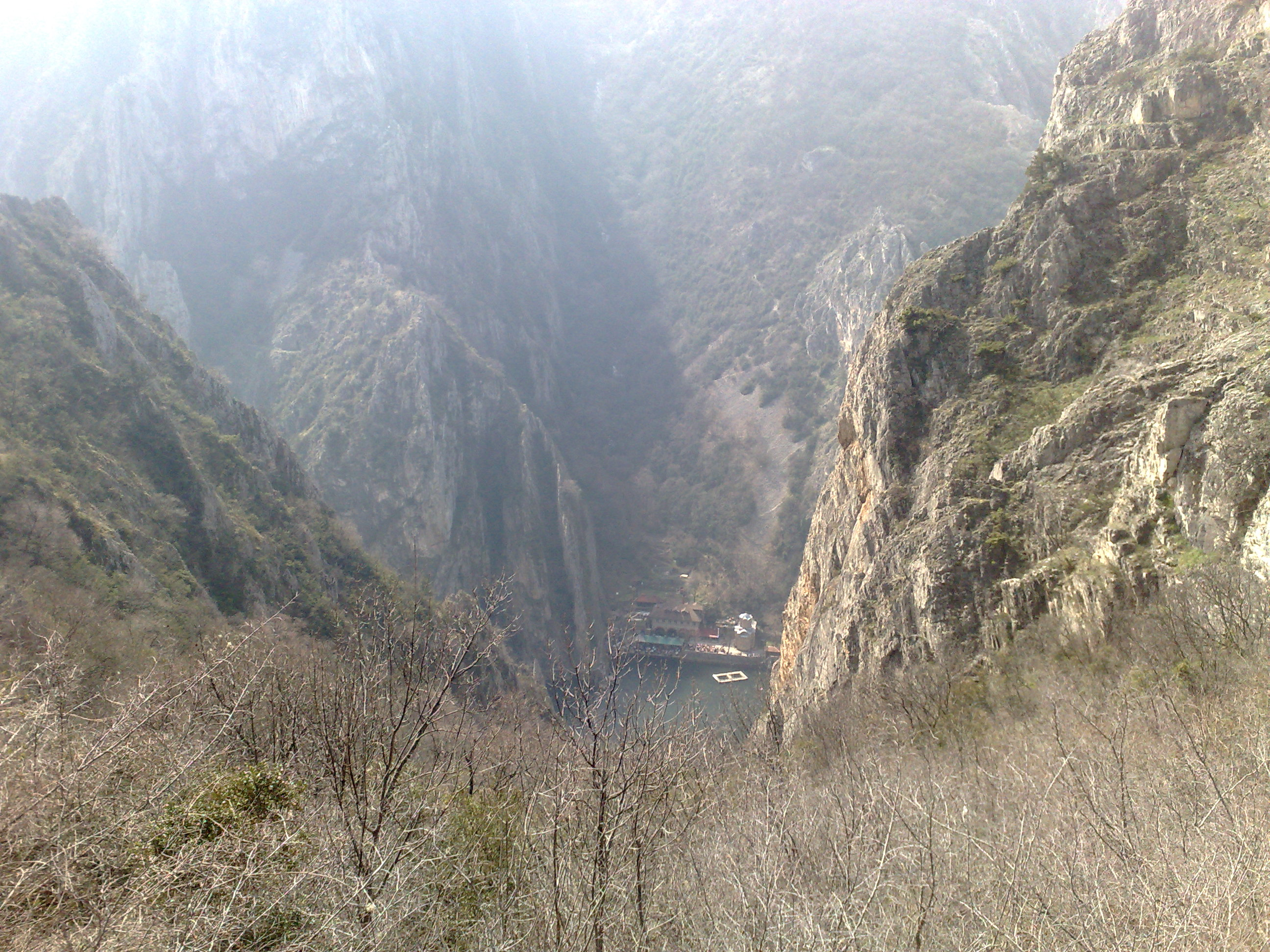
View of St. Andrew's Church from the St. Nicholas Šiševski Monastery

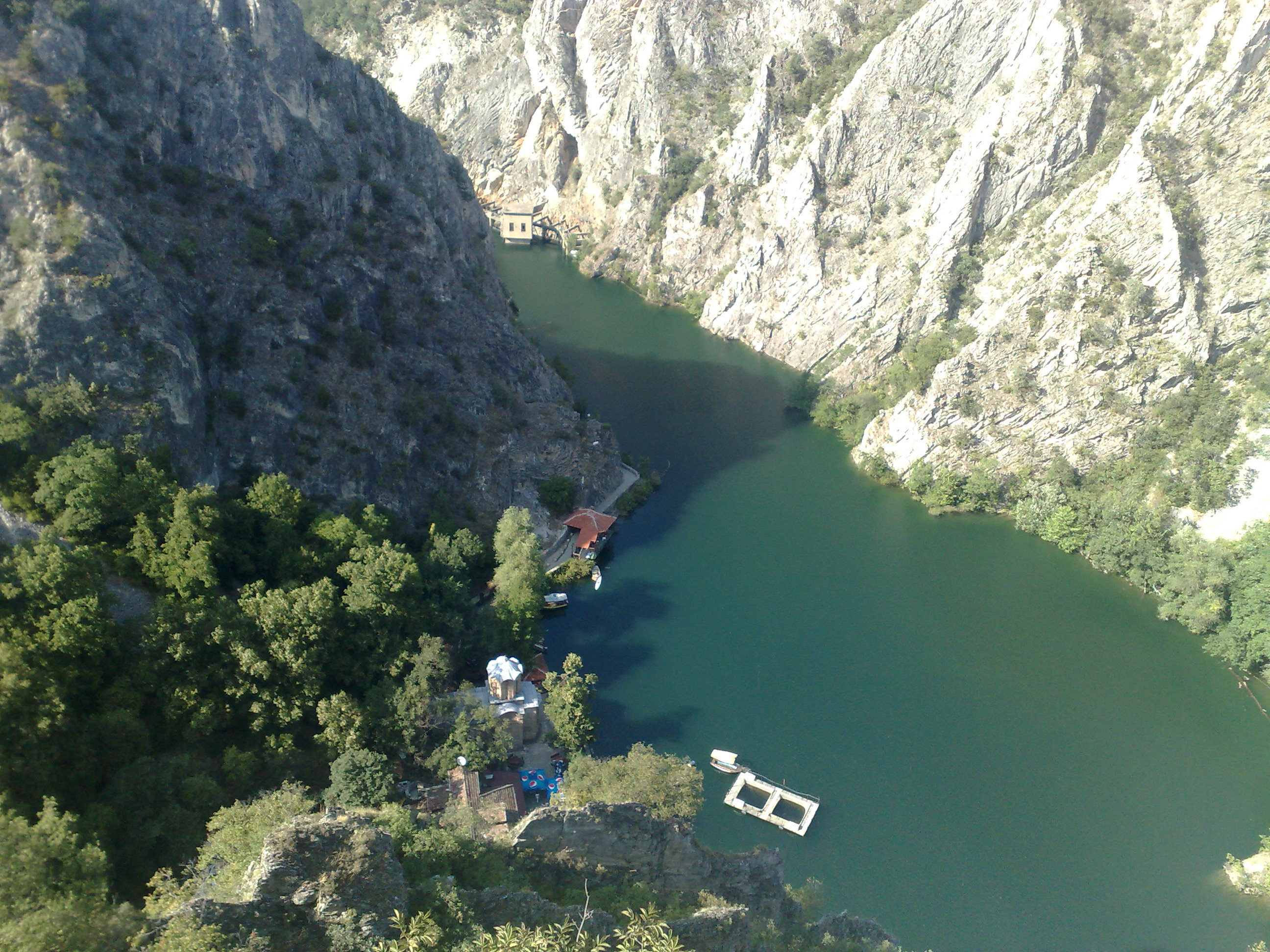
View of St. Andrew's Church and Lake Matka from the Markovi Porti area

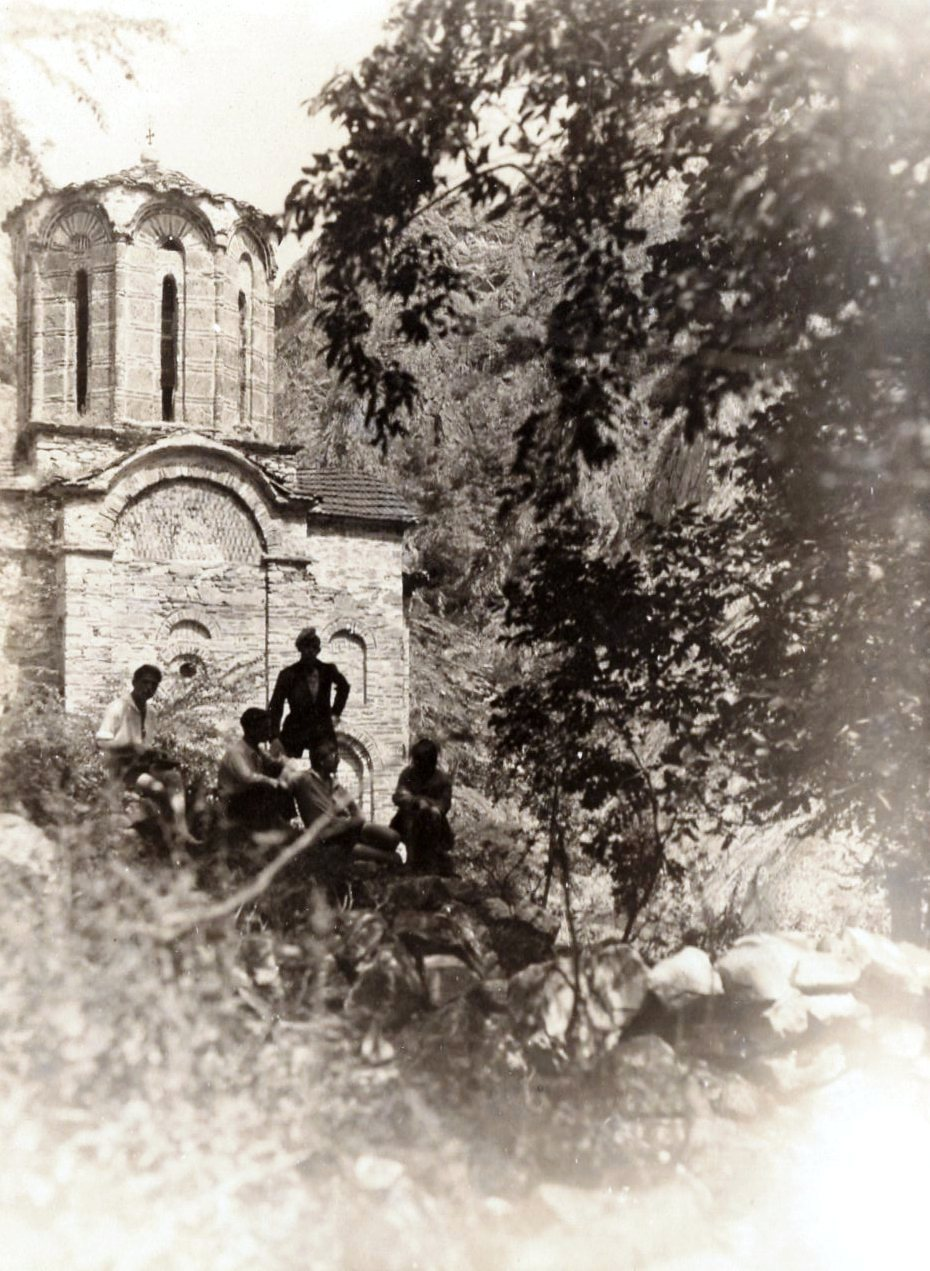
Old image of the church
