= Matka Canyon =

Canyon west of central Skopje, North Macedonia

Coordinates: 41°56′24″N 21°18′00″E

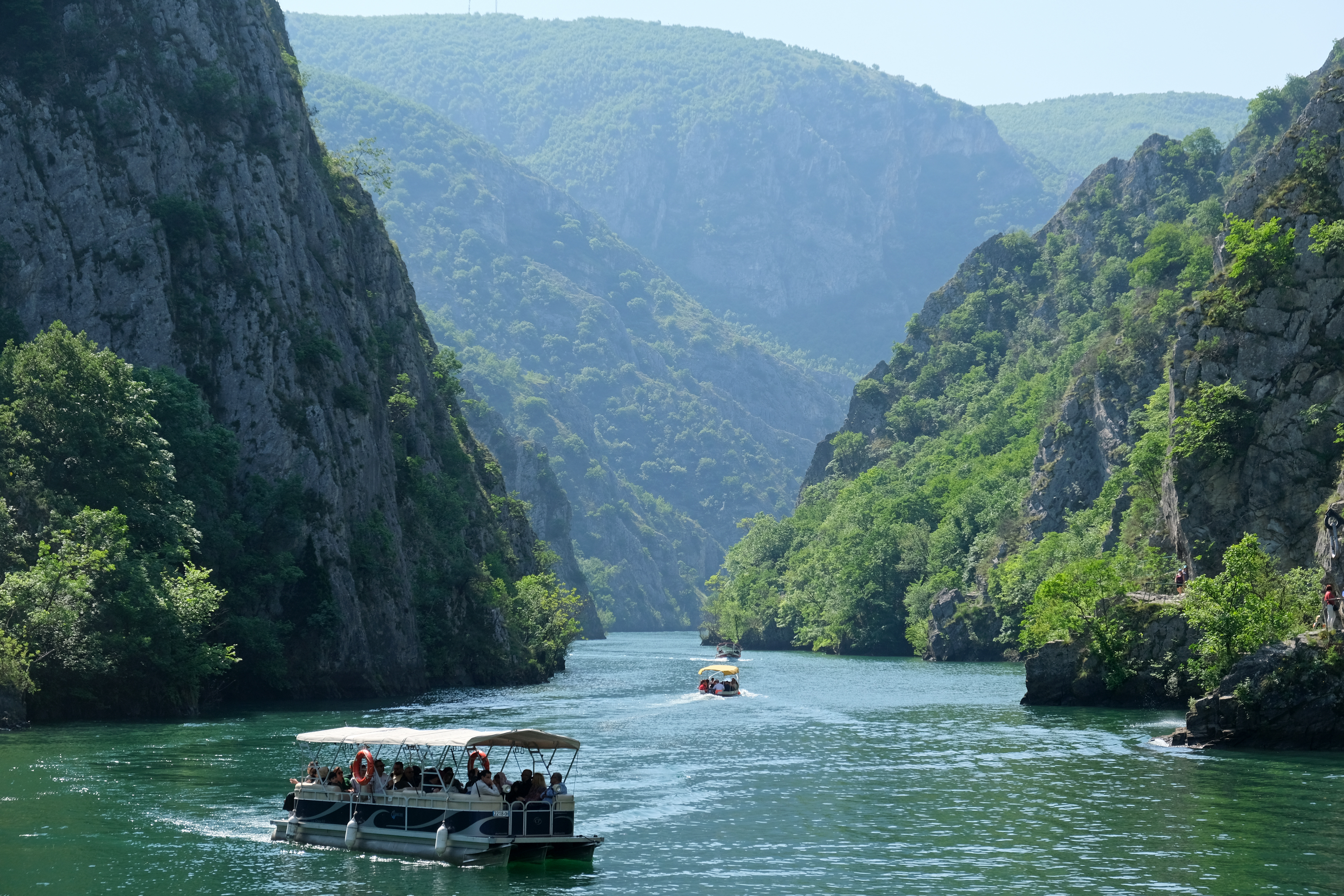
Matka Canyon

Matka (Macedonian: Матка; Albanian: Matkë) is a canyon located west of central Skopje, North Macedonia. Covering roughly 5,000 hectares, Matka is one of the most popular outdoor destinations in North Macedonia and is home to several medieval monasteries. The Matka Lake within the Matka Canyon is the oldest artificial lake in the country.

== Geology ==
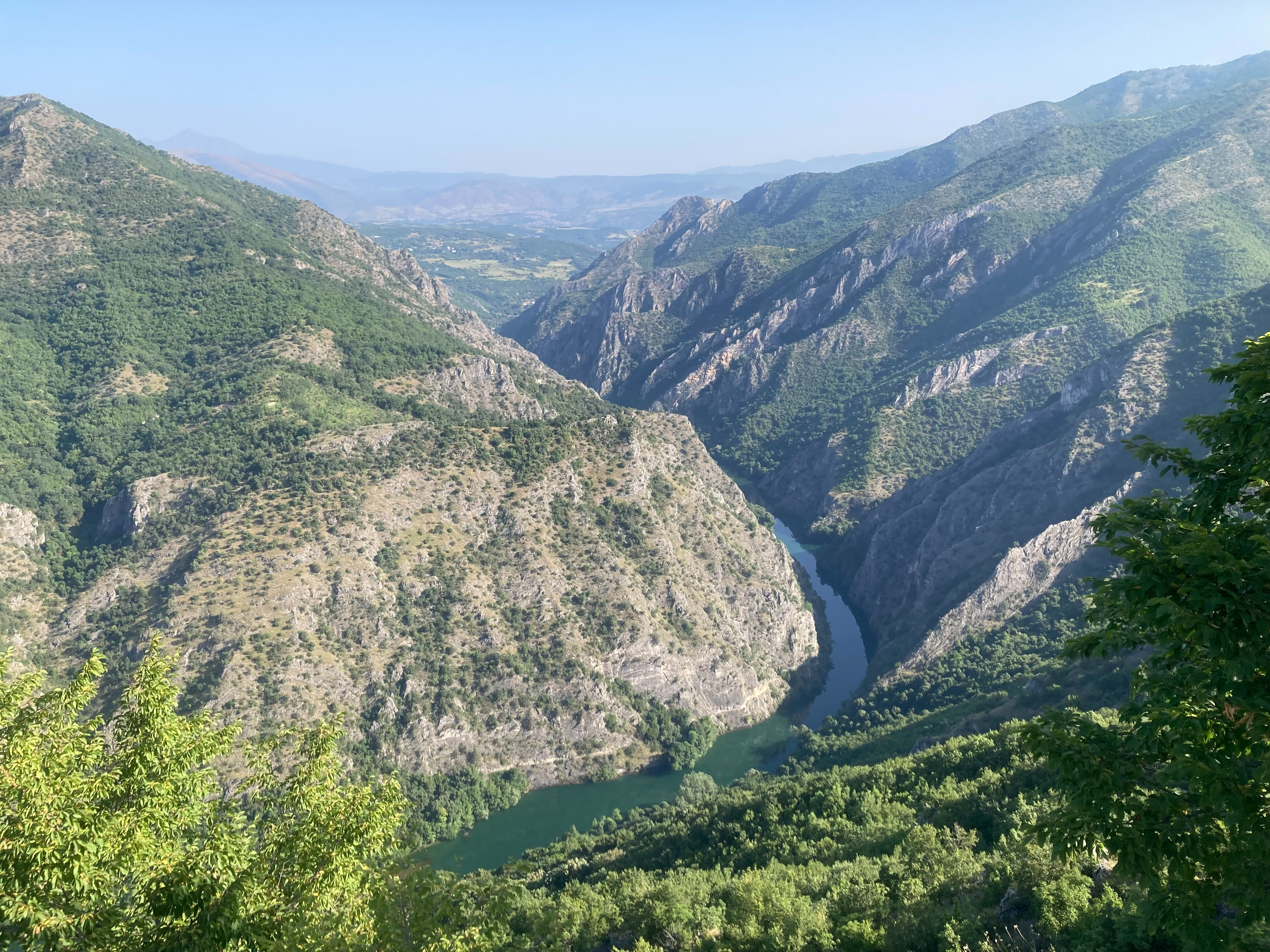
View from above

There are ten caves at Matka Canyon, with the shortest in length being 20 metres (65.6 feet) and the longest being 176 metres (577.4 feet). The canyon also features two vertical pits, both roughly extending 35 metres (114.8 feet) in depth.

=== Vrelo Cave ===
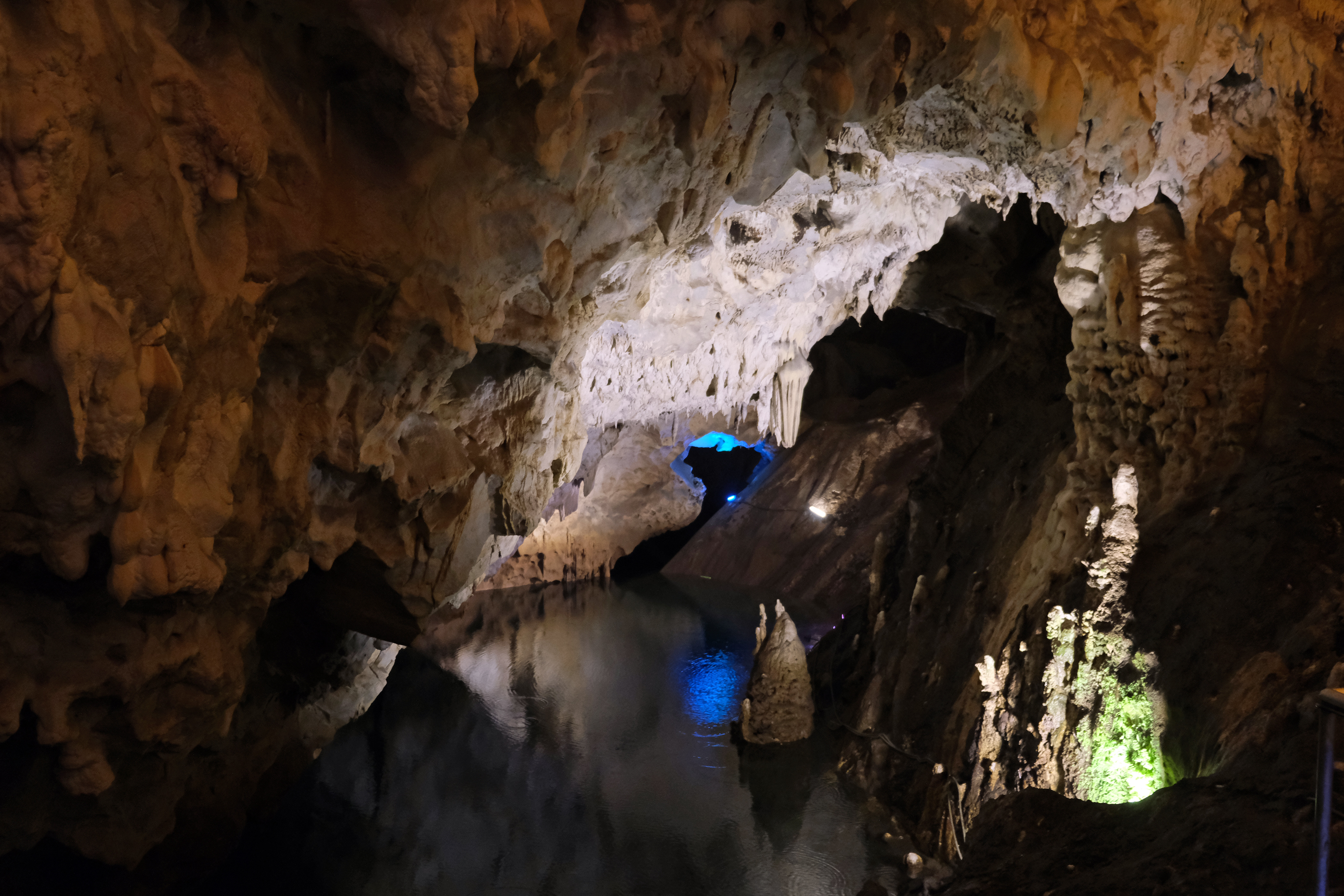
Vrelo Cave in Matka Canyon

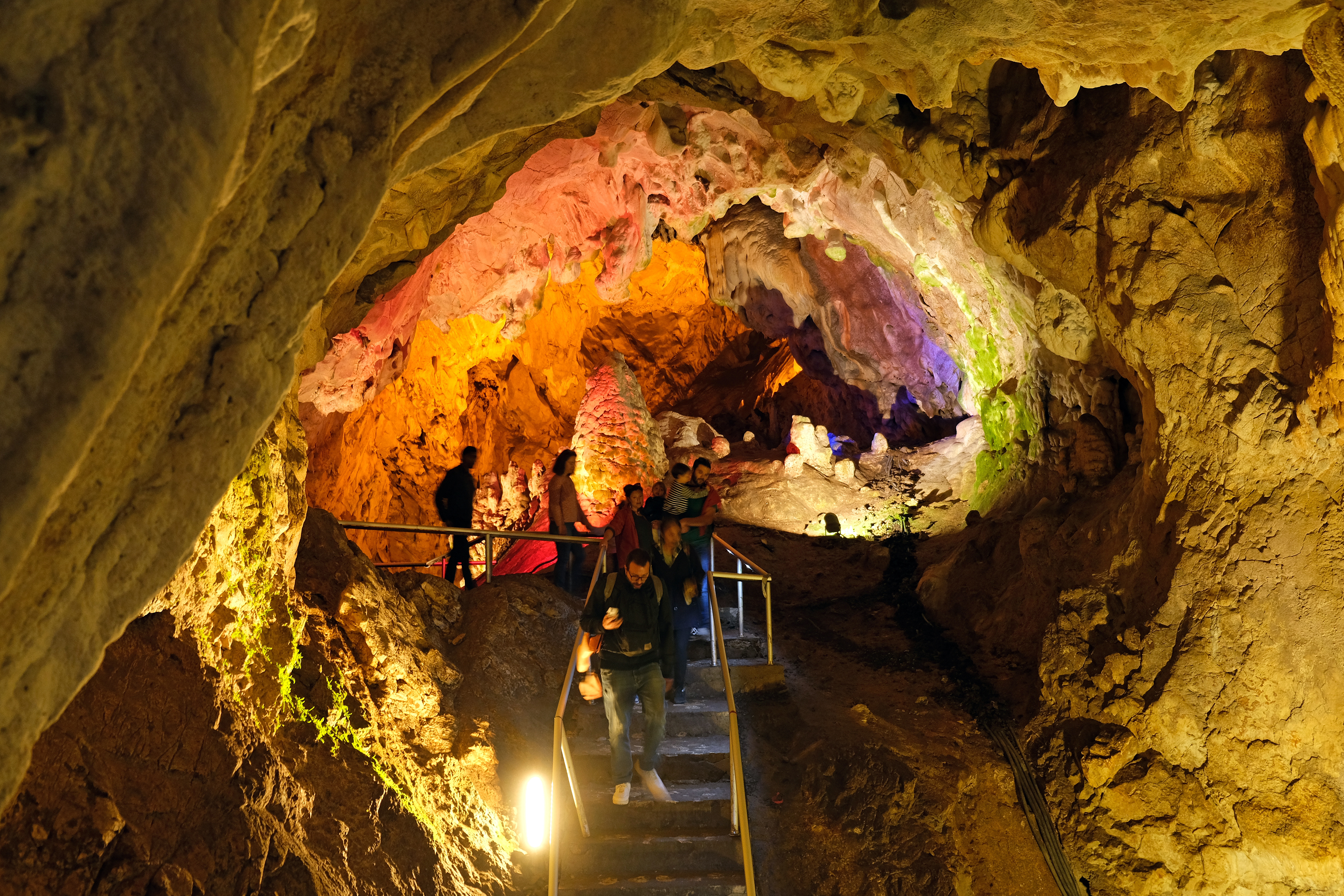
Vrelo Cave in Matka Canyon

Located on the right bank of the Treska River, Vrelo Cave was listed as one of the top 77 natural sites in the world in the New7Wonders of Nature project.

Vrelo Cave has many stalactites including a large one in the middle of the cave known as the "Pine Cone" due to its shape. There are two lakes at the end of the cave, with one larger than the other. The smaller lake is 8 metres (26.2 feet) at its longest length and 14.92 metres (48.9 feet) in depth at its deepest point. The larger lake is 35 metres (114.8 feet) at its longest length, and 18 metres (59 feet) at its deepest point.

Though the exact depth of the cave is unknown, it is believed to be among the deepest in Europe and/or the world.

== Biology ==
Matka Canyon is home to a wide variety of plants and animals, some of which are unique to the area. Roughly 20% of the plant life found at Matka is endemic and only found there. The canyon is also home to 77 indigenous species of butterfly, in addition to the most venomous snake in south Europe, the horned viper. The canyon's caves are home to large populations of bats.

== Attractions ==
Due in large part to its proximity to Skopje, Matka Canyon is a popular destination for citizens and tourists. The canyon is one of North Macedonia's foremost areas for alpine hiking. The climbing season begins around Easter and ends in November. Kayaking on the Treska River is a popular activity, as are fishing, hunting, and swimming.

=== Monasteries ===
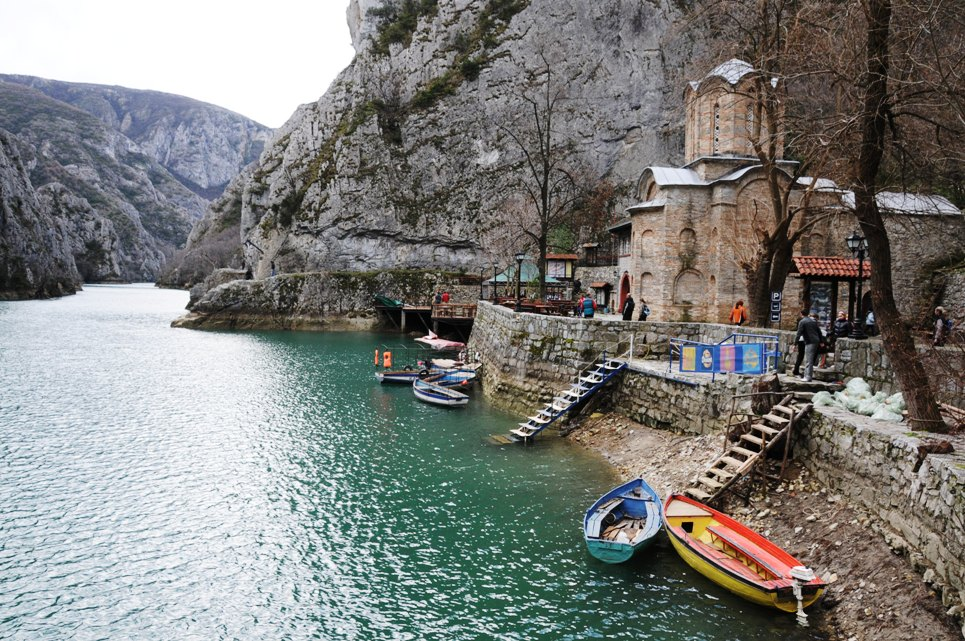
St. Andrew's Monastery on the water

The canyon area is home to several historic churches and monasteries. St. Andrew's Monastery, founded around 1388 by Prince Marko's brother Andrew, is situated in the gorge of the Treska River.

Matka Monastery, or Monastery of the Holy Mother of God, built in the 14th century, is located on the left bank of the Treska. According to an inscription on the church, someone named Milica found the church in poor condition and without a roof in 1497. She replaced the roof, added new frescoes, built a portico and created a vineyard.

St. Nicholas Šiševski Monastery is located on a cliff above the canyon and St. Andrew's Monastery. The date of construction of the church is unknown. The first mention of it was in the 17th century, during Ottoman rule. The iconstasis of the church was painted in 1645, while the western side was frescoed in 1630. The monastery was deserted in the 18th century. An archmonk found the church roofless in 1816 and attempted to revive it, though it was again deserted in 1897. The monastery offers a unique view high above the canyon.

== Gallery ==
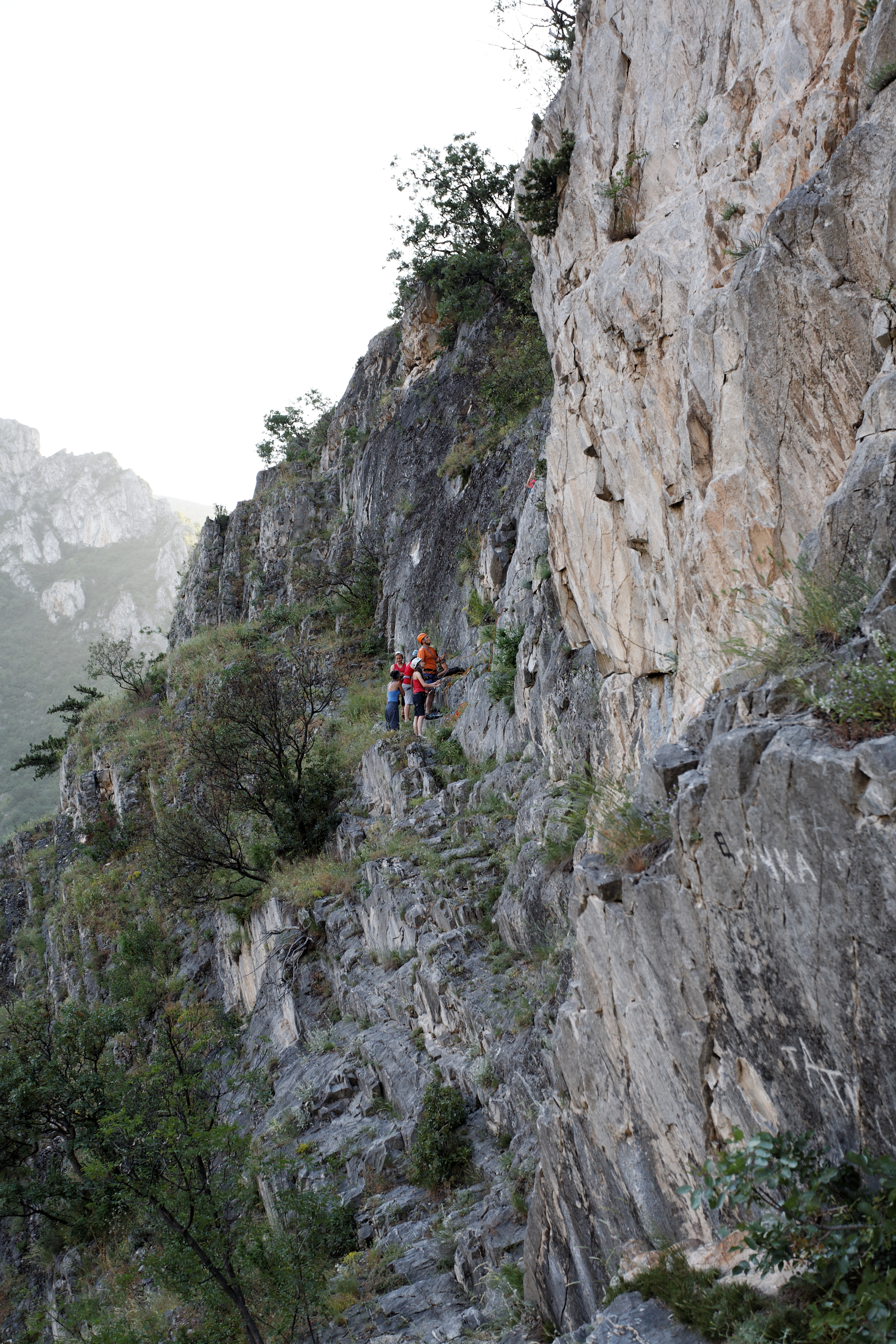
Rock climbers

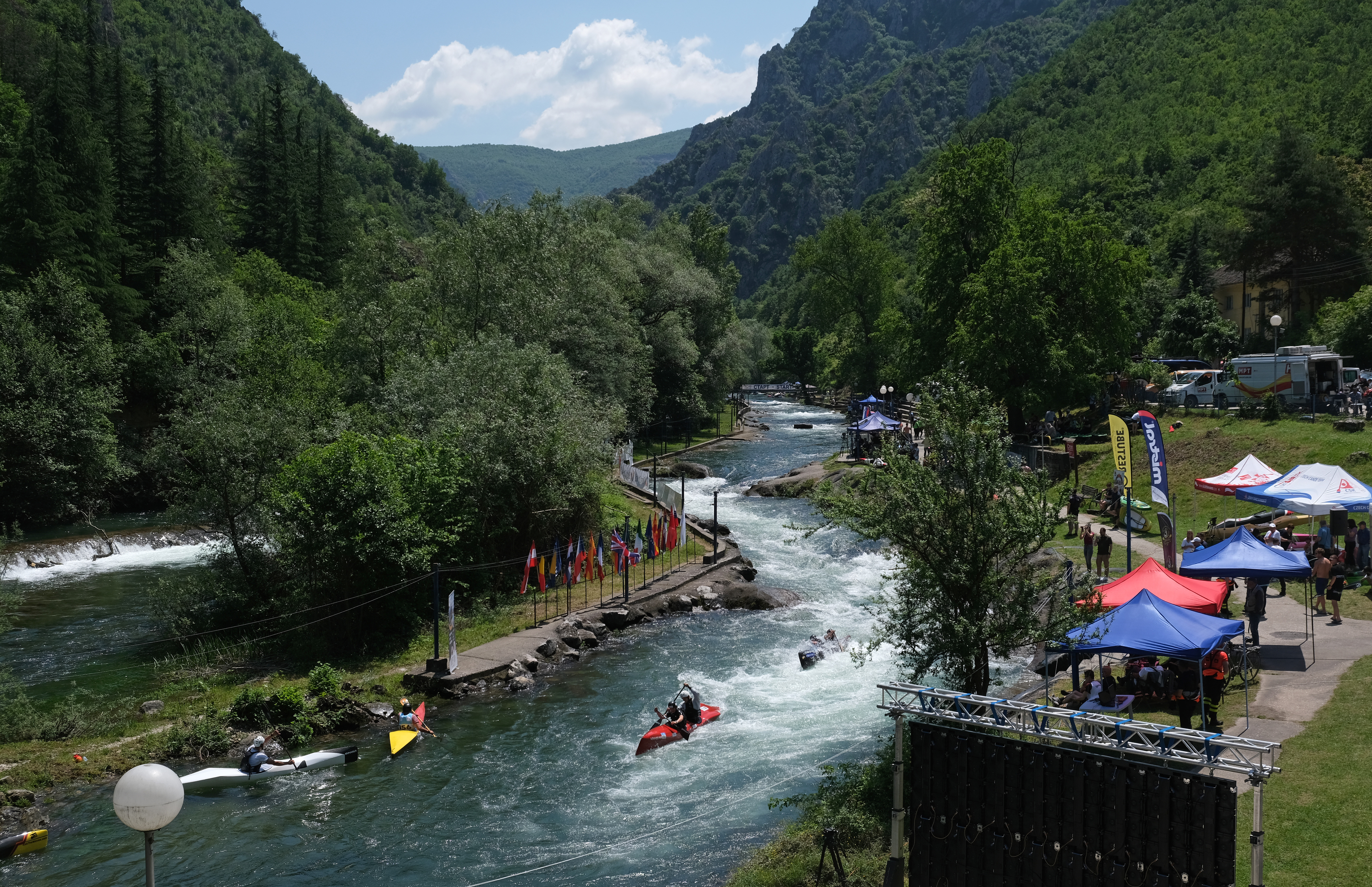
2023 ECA Wildwater Canoeing European Championships

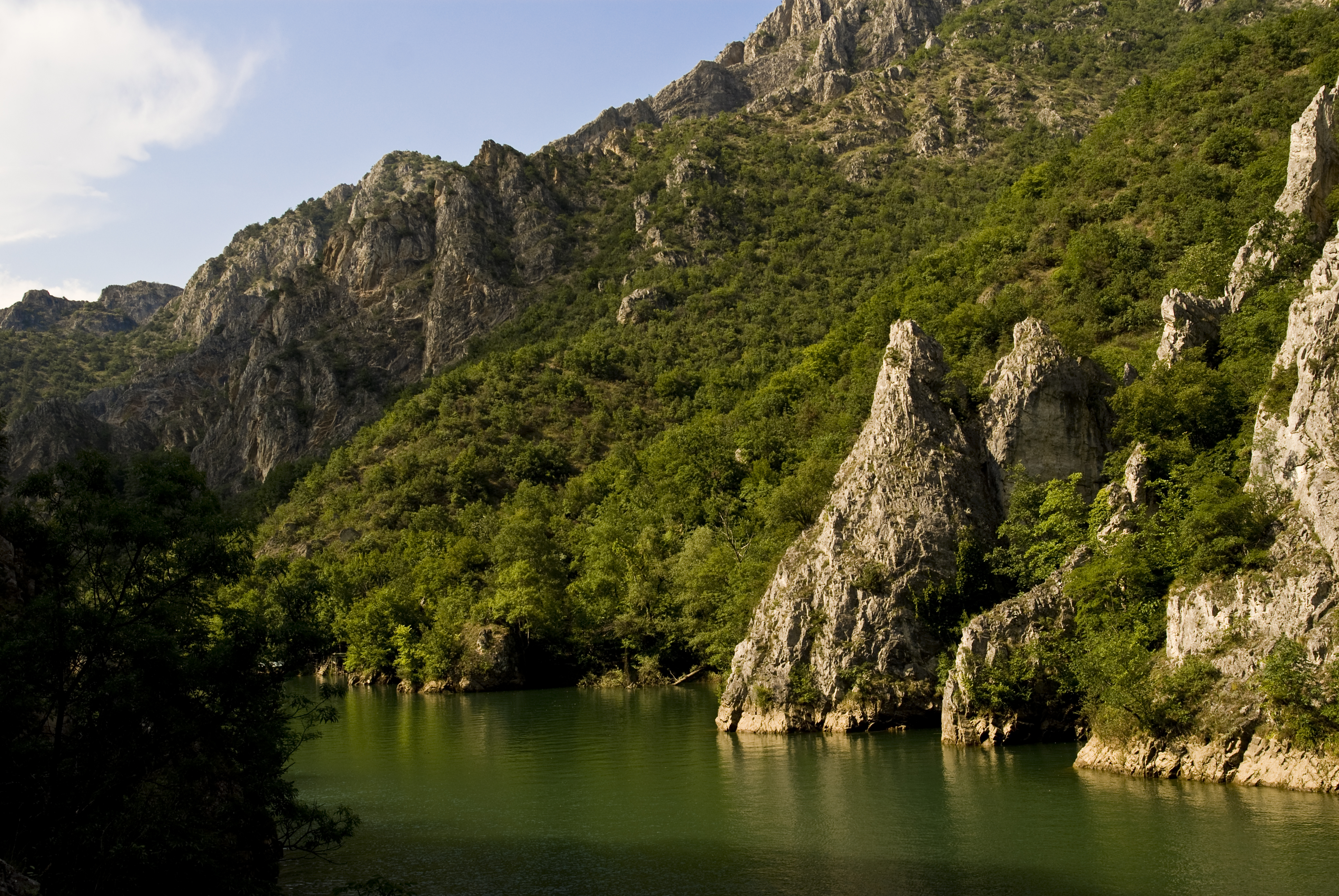
Lake Matka

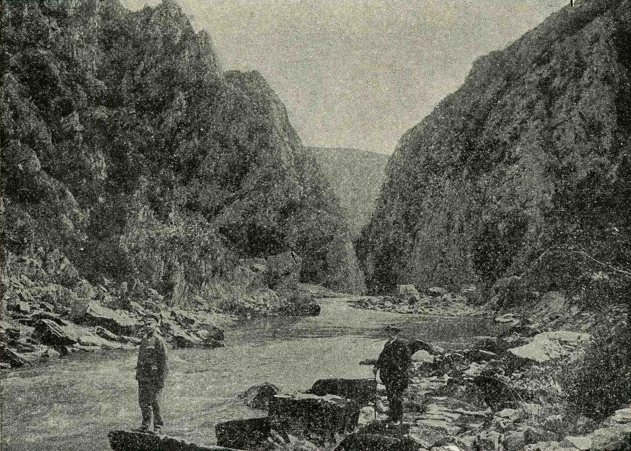
Matka in 1919

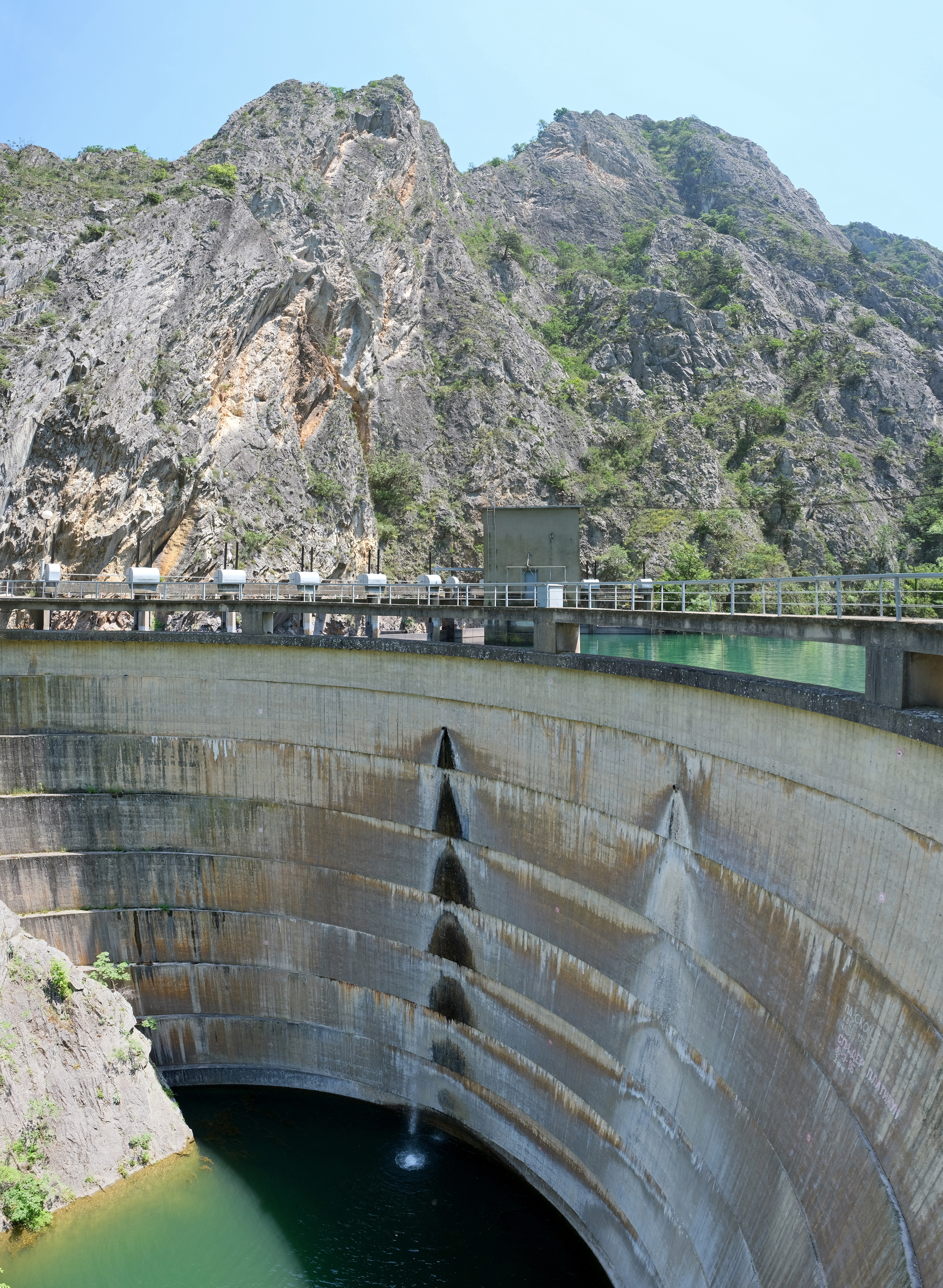
Matka dam

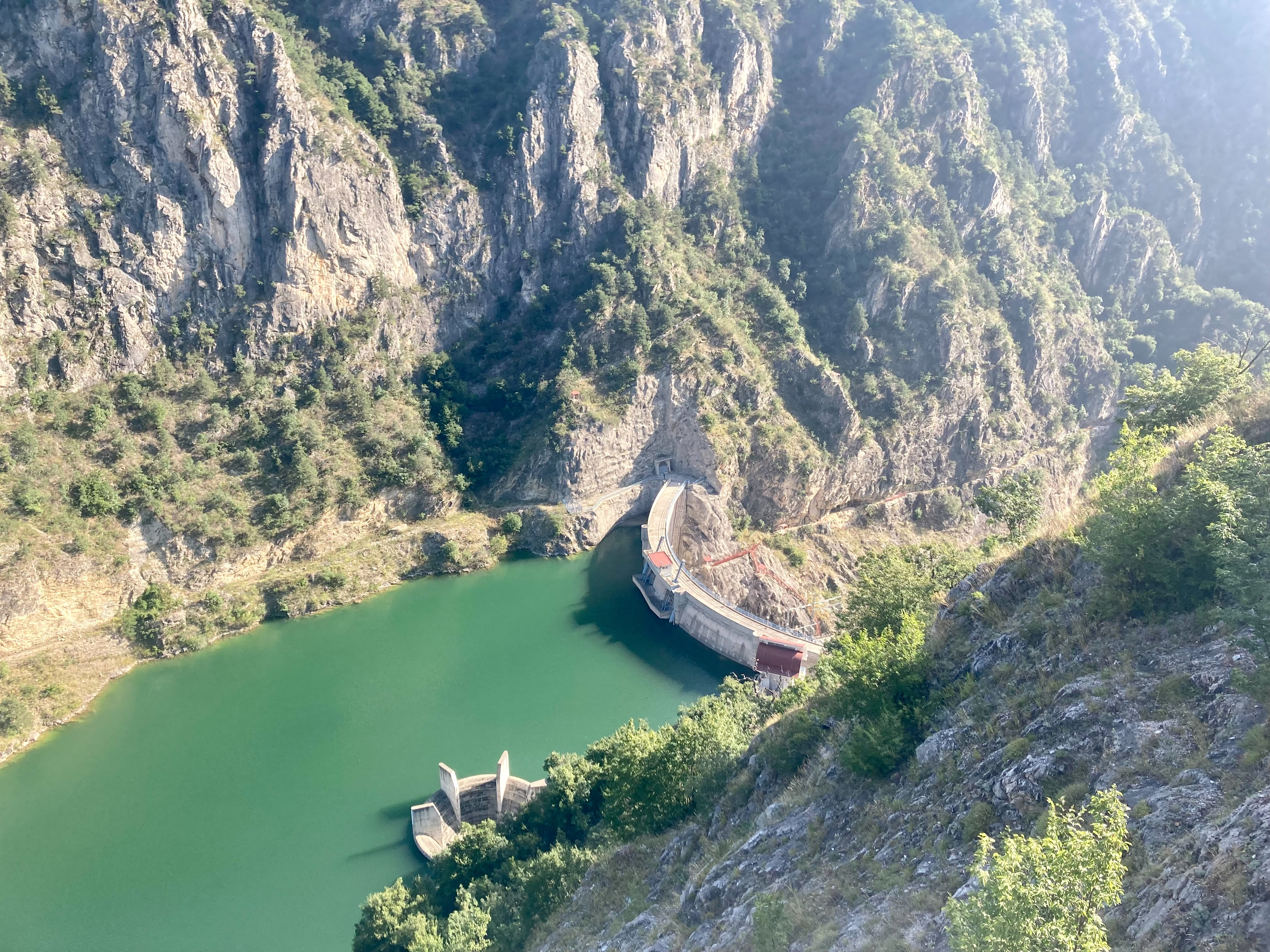
Sveta Petka (Matka2) dam

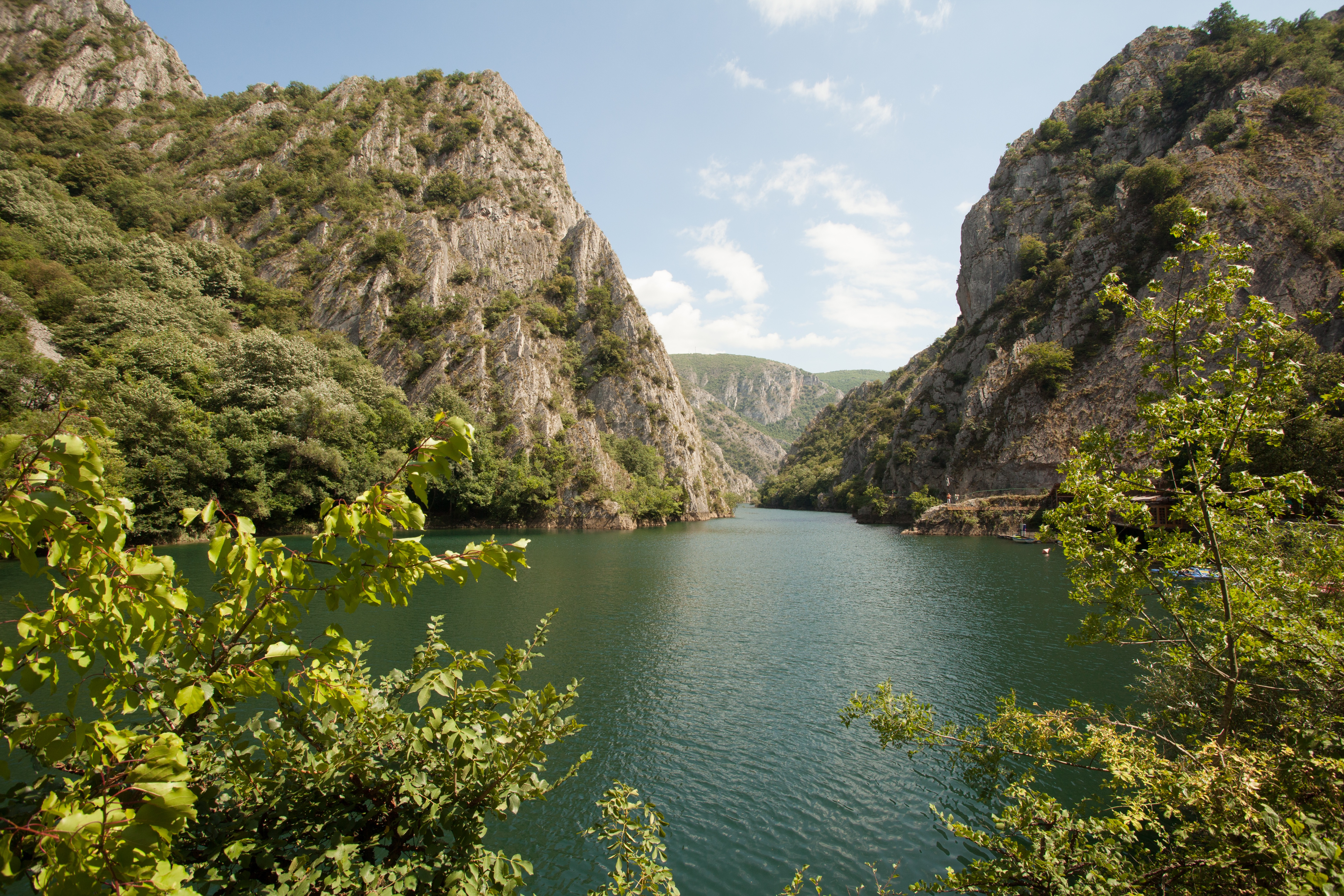
View over Matka Lake, Macedonia

== See also ==
- Matka, nearby village in Saraj municipality
- Treska
