= Treska =

River in North Macedonia

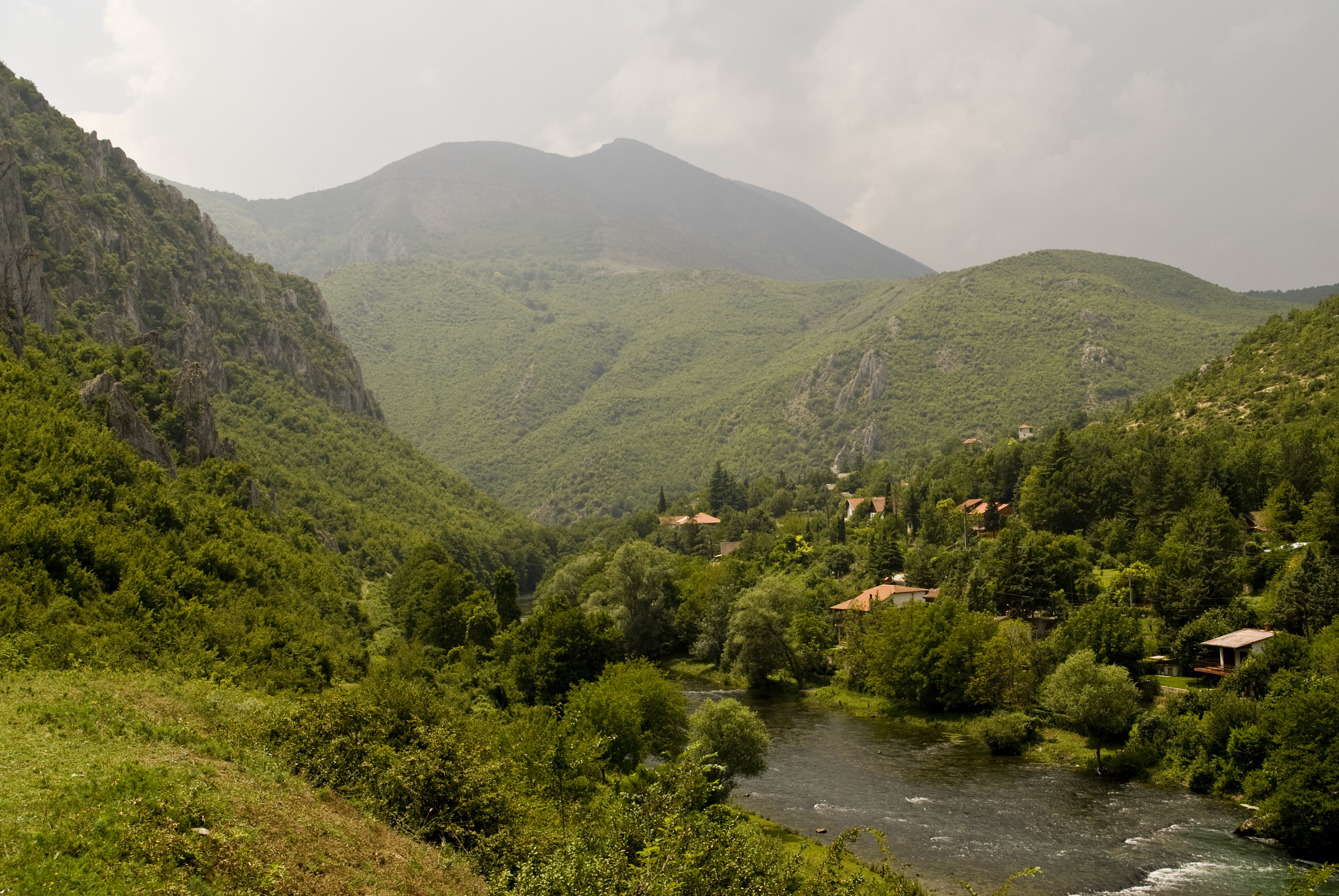
- View of the Treska in the Poreče Region

Location
- Country: North Macedonia

Physical characteristics
- Source
  - location: Stogovo, North Macedonia
- Mouth
  - location: Vardar
  - coordinates: 42.0022°N 21.3473°E
- Length: 132 km (82 mi)
- Basin size: 2,068 km²

Basin features
- Progression: Vardar→ Aegean Sea

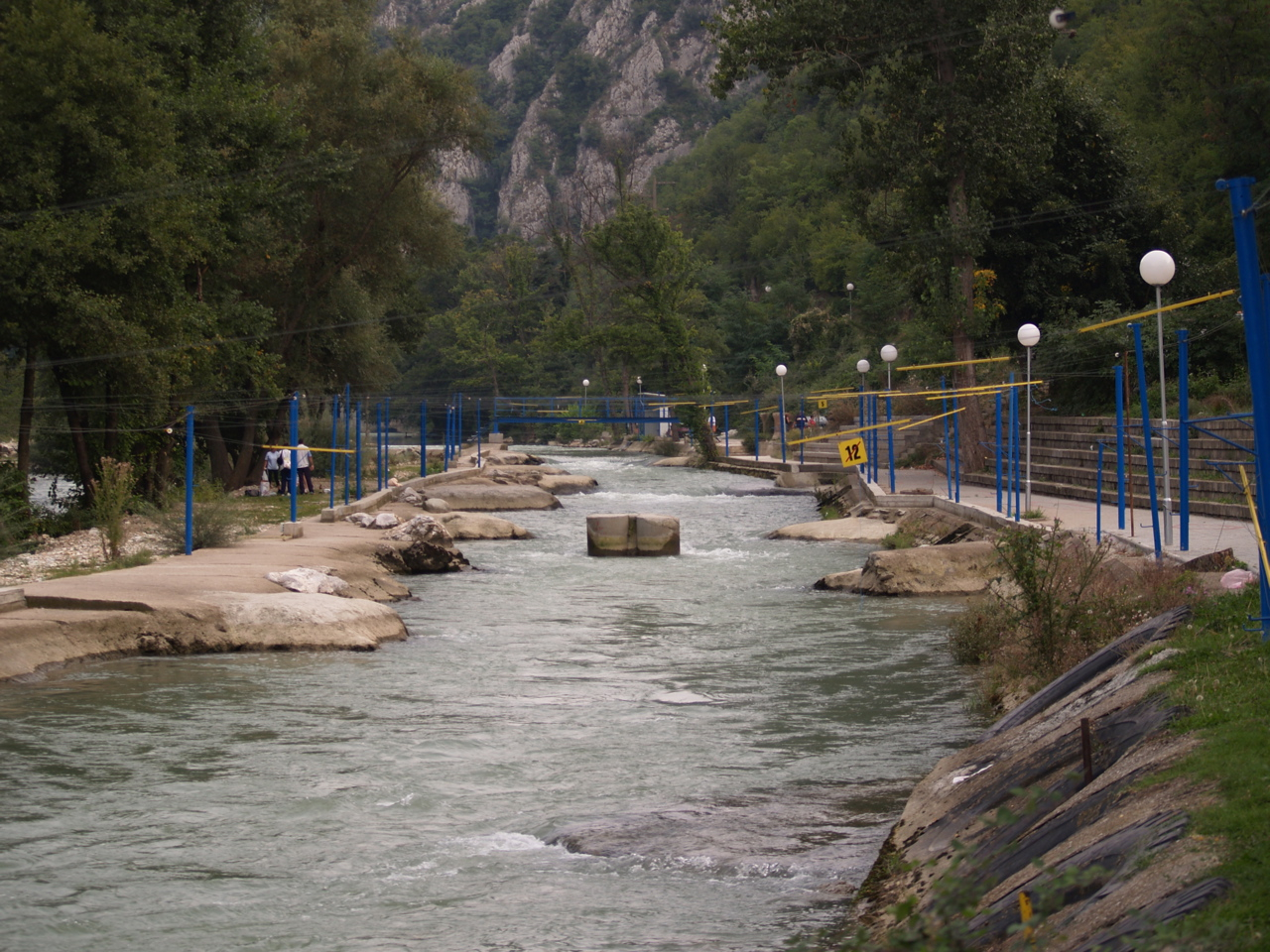
Kayak track in the river

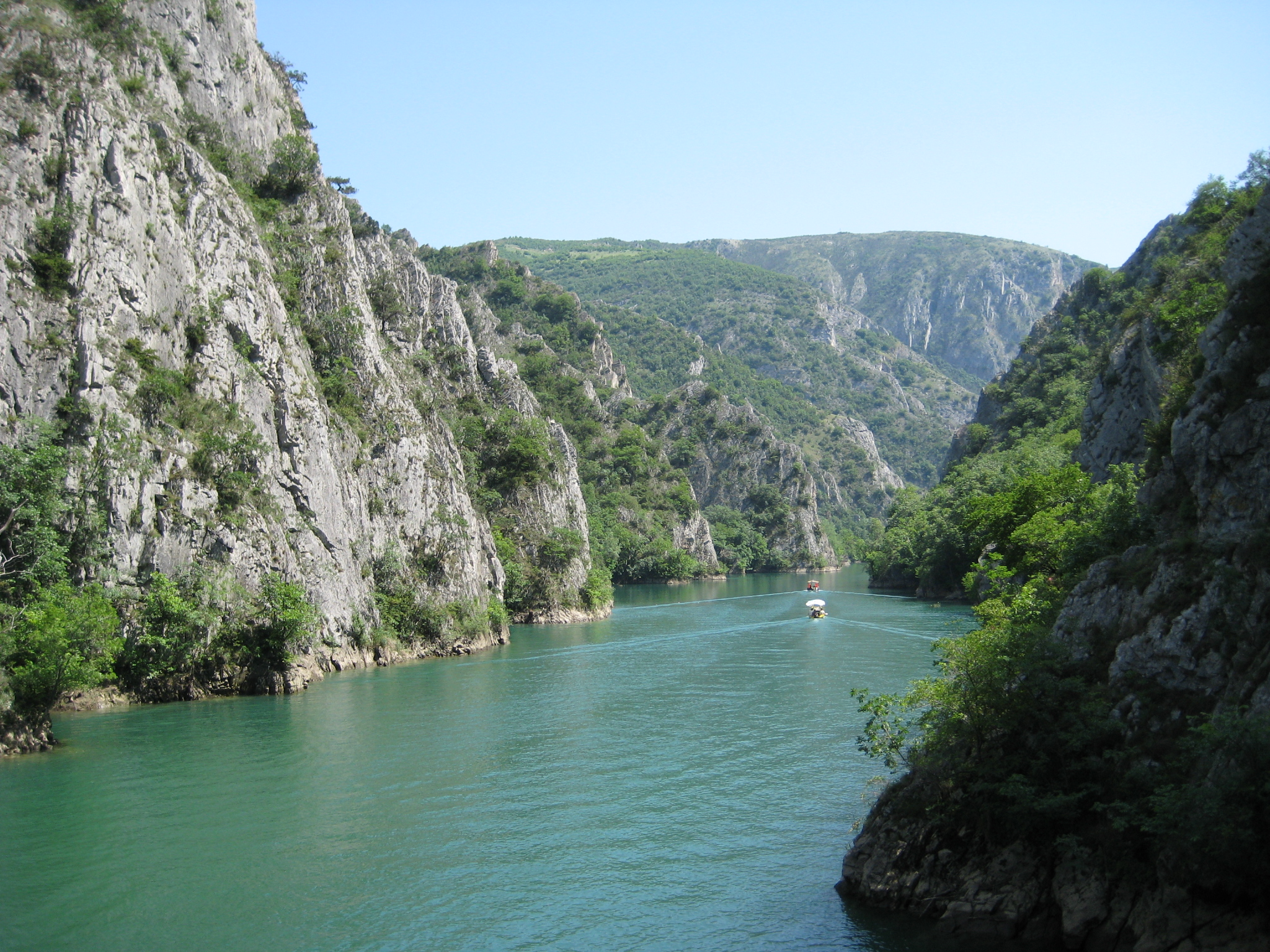
Lake Matka

Treska (Macedonian: Треска; Albanian: Treskë), is a river in the western part of North Macedonia, flowing for 132 km (82 mi) before joining the Vardar as its right tributary. With a basin covering 2,068 km^{2}, the river originates high in the Stogovo mountain at about 2,000 metres elevation, initially flowing eastward through the Kičevo valley before making a sharp northward turn near Makedonski Brod and continuing through a narrow valley between the Suva Gora and Karadžica mountains to eventually meet the Vardar river near Skopje. The river system is known for its three major dams—Matka (built in 1937), Kozjak (2004), and Sveta Petka (2012)—as well as its diverse groundwater resources, which include isotropic aquifers in river valleys, fractured aquifers in mountainous regions, and particularly significant karst aquifers in limestone-rich areas that supply water to several towns in North Macedonia despite facing contamination risks from inadequate sewage infrastructure, unsanctioned landfills, intensive agriculture, and highland livestock farming.

== Course ==
Treska originates from Stogovo mountain at an elevation of roughly 2,000 metres. Initially flowing eastwards, the river crosses through the valley around the town of Kičevo. Near Makedonski Brod, Treska takes a sharp turn northward, flowing through a narrow valley bordered by the mountains of Suva Gora to the west and Karadžica to the east, before finally joining the Vardar river at the suburb of Gjorče Petrov near Skopje.

== Dams and lakes ==
Several dams have been constructed on the Treska river:

- Matka dam, built in 1937, forms Lake Matka near Skopje.
- Kozjak dam, constructed in 2004.
- Sveta Petka dam, completed in 2012.

== Groundwater resources ==
The Treska river basin features a wide variety of groundwater resources, which differ based on the geological structure and the porosity of the rocks. Isotropic aquifers, which are located mainly along the riverbeds and in valleys such as near Kičevo and where the Treska meets the Vardar river, contain both shallow groundwater that can be easily tapped by wells and deeper artesian water reserves beneath impermeable sediment layers. Fractured aquifers occur frequently in mountainous areas including Bistra, Stogovo, and Suva Gora. These aquifers primarily consist of cracked rocks with limited water storage capacity due to their low permeability, thus limiting their significance as reliable water sources.

The most important groundwater resources in the basin are karst aquifers, particularly found in limestone-rich regions around mountains like Bistra, Dautica, Jakupica, Karadžica, and Suva. In these areas, water penetrates soluble limestone formations, creating substantial underground reservoirs. Major karst springs such as Studenchica emerge from these reservoirs and are essential for regional water supply, serving towns including Kičevo, Makedonski Brod, Kruševo, and Prilep, with flow rates between 0.9 and 2.8 cubic metres per second. Karst-fractured aquifers, present to a lesser extent in regions such as the Bistra and Osoj mountains, show highly variable water storage and availability, heavily influenced by the particular rock structures and the density of fractures.

== Mala Reka tributary ==
Mala Reka is a significant left tributary of the Treska River, joining it within the central region of the Poreče basin near Kalugjerec village. Formed by the confluence of several smaller rivers, including Bencheska, Kovachka, and Crneshnica, Mala Reka originates from the Dobra Voda–Suva Gora mountain range at an elevation of about 1,460 metres. The river flows downward, eventually merging with the Treska River at an elevation of 470 metres. The basin of Mala Reka spans an area of about 188 square kilometers, accounting for roughly 9% of the total Treska river basin. The tributary network within the Mala Reka basin includes around 246 kilometres of streams, both periodic and permanent, with a significant average slope of about 32.4 metres per kilometre, indicating considerable hydrological potential. Overall, the elevation difference from the source to the confluence with Treska is about 990 metres.

== Environmental concerns ==
Groundwater in the Treska basin faces risks from several human activities, potentially compromising water quality. Rural regions typically lack adequate sewage infrastructure, relying instead on septic systems, often improperly constructed. Additionally, unsanctioned landfills scattered across the basin pose contamination risks due to leaking pollutants into soil and water. Agriculture contributes further to contamination through intensive use of fertilizers and pesticides. Highland livestock farming also introduces chemical and bacterial pollutants into groundwater.

Due to these conditions, the Treska basin—especially karst regions—is considered highly vulnerable to groundwater contamination. Effective protection and management strategies are critical to safeguarding these important resources and maintaining water quality for local populations.
