= Rudnik Raduša =

Rudnik Raduša Рудник Радуша Rudnik
- Village
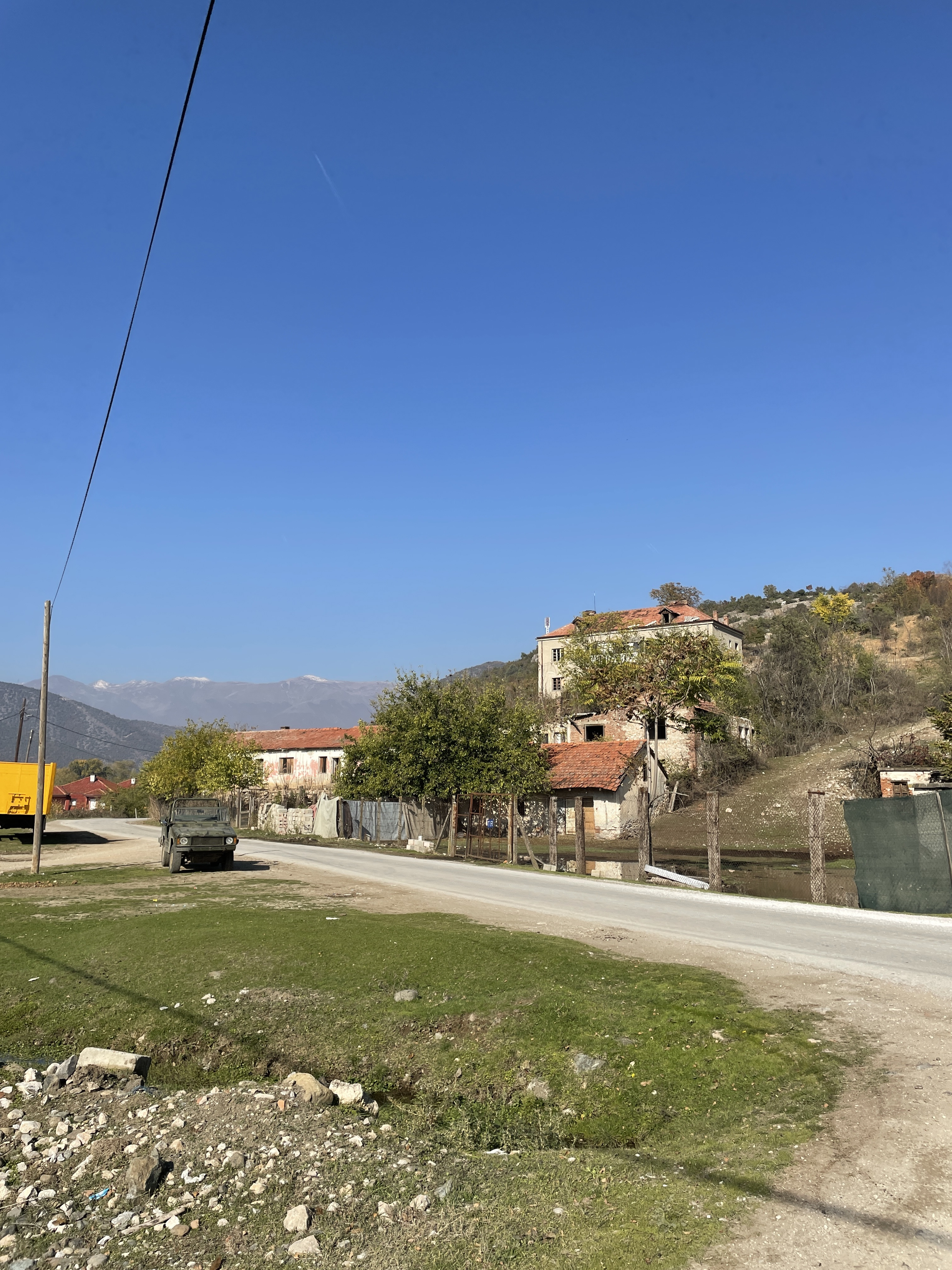
- Houses in the village
- Interactive map of Rudnik Raduša
- Location within North Macedonia
- Coordinates: 42°05′07″N 21°13′29″E
- Country: North Macedonia
- Region: Skopje
- Municipality: Saraj

Population (2021)
  - Total: 179
- Time zone: UTC+1 (CET)
  - Summer (DST): UTC+2 (CEST)
- Car plates: SK
- Website: .

Rudnik Raduša (Macedonian: Рудник Радуша, Albanian: Rudnik) is a village in the municipality of Saraj, North Macedonia. The village is located in the extreme northwestern part of the Skopje Valley, in the Žeden Gorge, immediately located on the left side of the Vardar River. It is located in the northern part of the area of the Municipality of Saraj. Traditionally, the place was part of the Raduša village. The small Raduška River passes through Rudnik Raduša, which flows into the Vardar in the village itself.

== Name ==
The word rudnik means mine in Macedonian, while the name Raduša derives from the personal name Raduš or Raduh. Rudnik Raduša was formerly the site of a significant chromite mine that served as a crucial source of chromium for Yugoslavia. When the chromium mine in Raduša opened, the separated mining settlement became a separate administrative unit, which is why it got the name Rudnik Raduša.

== Demographics ==
In 1961, the village had a rather mixed ethnic composition, with a large Macedonian majority — out of a total of 702 inhabitants, 427 were Macedonians, 125 Albanians, 20 Serbs and 12 Turks, and 78 others. During the next decade, the population decreased by more than half. In the following censuses, the decrease in the number of Macedonians at the expense of the Albanians is noticeable. The 1991 census was not completely held in the village of Rudnik Raduša, because part of its population refused to participate, that is, boycotted its holding, which is why there are no complete data for the village for that census year. According to the 2002 census, 211 inhabitants lived in the village of Rudnik Radusha, of which 138 were Albanians, 11 Macedonians, 58 Roma, and 4 others.

According to the 2021 census, the village had a total of 179 inhabitants. Ethnic groups in the village include:

- Albanians 156
- Others 23

Year	Macedonian	Albanian	Turks	Romani	Vlachs	Serbs	Bosniaks	Others	Total
2002	11	138	...	58	...	...	...	4	211
2021	...	156	...	...	...	...	...	23	179

== Self-government and politics ==
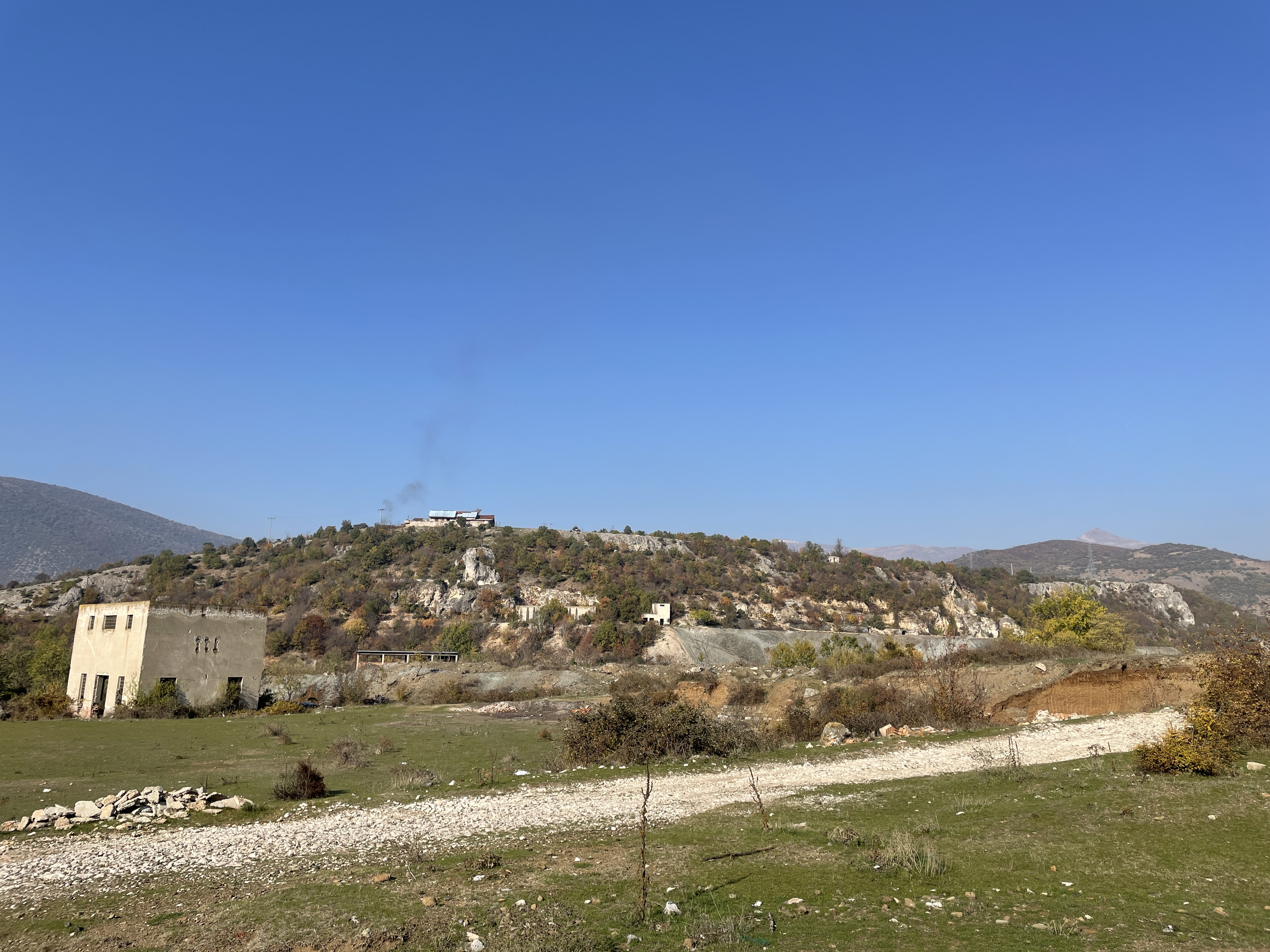
View of the facilities of the former Raduša mine

The village is part of the Municipality of Saraj, which was changed by the new territorial division of Macedonia in 2004. In the 1996–2004 period, the village was part of the former Municipality of Kondovo. In the period from 1965 to 1996, the village was located within the large municipality of Idadija. The village belonged to the former Municipality of Gjorče Petrov in the period from 1955 to 1965. In the period 1952-1955, the village was within the then Municipality of Rašče, in which, in addition to the village of Rudnik Raduša, there were also the villages of Gorno Svilari, Dolno Svilari, Dvorce, Kopanica, Raduša, and Rašče. In the 1950–1952 period, the village was part of the former municipality of Raduša, which included the villages of Dvorce, Raduša and Rudnik Raduša.

=== Polling station ===
In the village is the polling station No. 2456 according to the State Election Commission, located in the premises of the elementary school in the village of Raduša. In the 2020 parliamentary elections, a total of 110 voters were registered at these polling stations.

== Cultural and natural landmarks ==
Rivers

- Raduška River — a left tributary of Vardar, flows in Vardar in the village itself

Lakes

- Raduša ('Takbol' reservoir) — the lake of the former Raduša chromium mine

== Transport ==
The regional road R2234 (Saraj – Tearce) passes along the Raduška river between Rudnik Raduša and Raduša. The village is served by the Raduša railway station on the Skopje–Kičevo line.
