= Sulejman Rexhepi =

- Title: Reis-ul-ulema

Personal life
- Born: 1947 (age 78–79) Gorno Svilare, SFR Yugoslavia
- Children: 1

Religious life
- Religion: Islam

Muslim leader
- Post: Head of the Islamic Religious Community of Macedonia
- Period in office: 2006–2020
- Successor: Shaqir Fetahu

Sulejman Rexhepi (Macedonian: Сулејман Реџепи; born 1947) is the former leader of the Islamic Religious Community of Macedonia.

== Life ==
Sulejman Rexhepi was born in 1947 in the village of Gorno Svilare, Socialist Federal Republic of Yugoslavia. He completed his primary education in the village and had secondary theological education in Pristina's madrasa "Alauddin". Rexhepi graduated from Kuwait University, specializing in law and sharia. The Isa Beu madrasa and Faculty of Islamic Studies in Skopje were co-founded by him. Rexhepi was a dean of the faculty. He became the leader (Reis-ul-ulema) of the Islamic Religious Community of Macedonia in 2006 and was re-elected several times after. A power struggle emerged between him and Skender Buzaku over the leadership of the Islamic Religious Community in 2019, with the latter self-proclaiming himself as head of the community. The Skopje Basic Court ruled in Buzaku's favor on 17 April but the decision was revoked by the Appellate Court. The Islamic Religious Community removed him from his position in 2020 and Shaqir Fetahu succeeded him.

== Personal life and views ==
In 2010, he supported the proposal to change the Macedonian constitution to define marriage strictly as a union between a man and a woman, as well as to prevent same-sex couples and single parents from adopting children. In 2012, Rexhepi made the following statement to an Albanian-language newspaper Zhurnal Plus: "The unification of Albanian lands was God’s will and we have an obligation to restore things as they were. The unification of the forces of the Albanian people at all levels will become a reality and Albania will have its authentic borders, the ones that God created." The statement was criticized by the head of the National Commission for Relations with the Religious Communities, a professor of the sociology of religion, and a politician. Albanian president Ilir Meta awarded him with the Order of Skanderbeg in 2018.

In a speech at the village Arnakija, during the ceremony for the reconstruction of a mosque on 14 March 2019, he stated: "We will not allow obstruction and prevention of the construction of mosques. We will never be silent. We hope, Godspeed, that better times will come, and we will construct mosques everywhere, we have people and location of village Lazhec, Bitola region, where for more than 100 years they have not had a mosque. Imagine, what kind of life we share with this wild nation. This is the reason why these nameless and wild people have no identity and will never have one, although we want to help them. They cannot be helped, soulless people never come to their senses." The statement received criticism as an example of hate speech in the media and by the civic organization "Civil". The Macedonian Helsinki Committee for Human Rights filed charges of hate speech against him for the statement. The Basic Public Prosecution in November opted not to charge him. In 2019, the Network for Protection against Discrimination and the National Network for Combating Homophobia and Transphobia strongly condemned his homophobic statement in response to a journalist question about the ultimatum given to him by Buzaku to resign from his position. In 2020, he got married. He has a son.
