= Glumovo =

Glumovo may refer to:

- Glumovo, Haskovo Province, Bulgaria
- Glumovo, Saraj, North Macedonia
