= Raduša chromium mine =

Chromium mine in Saraj Municipality, North Macedonia

Coordinates: 42°05′04″N 21°13′35″E

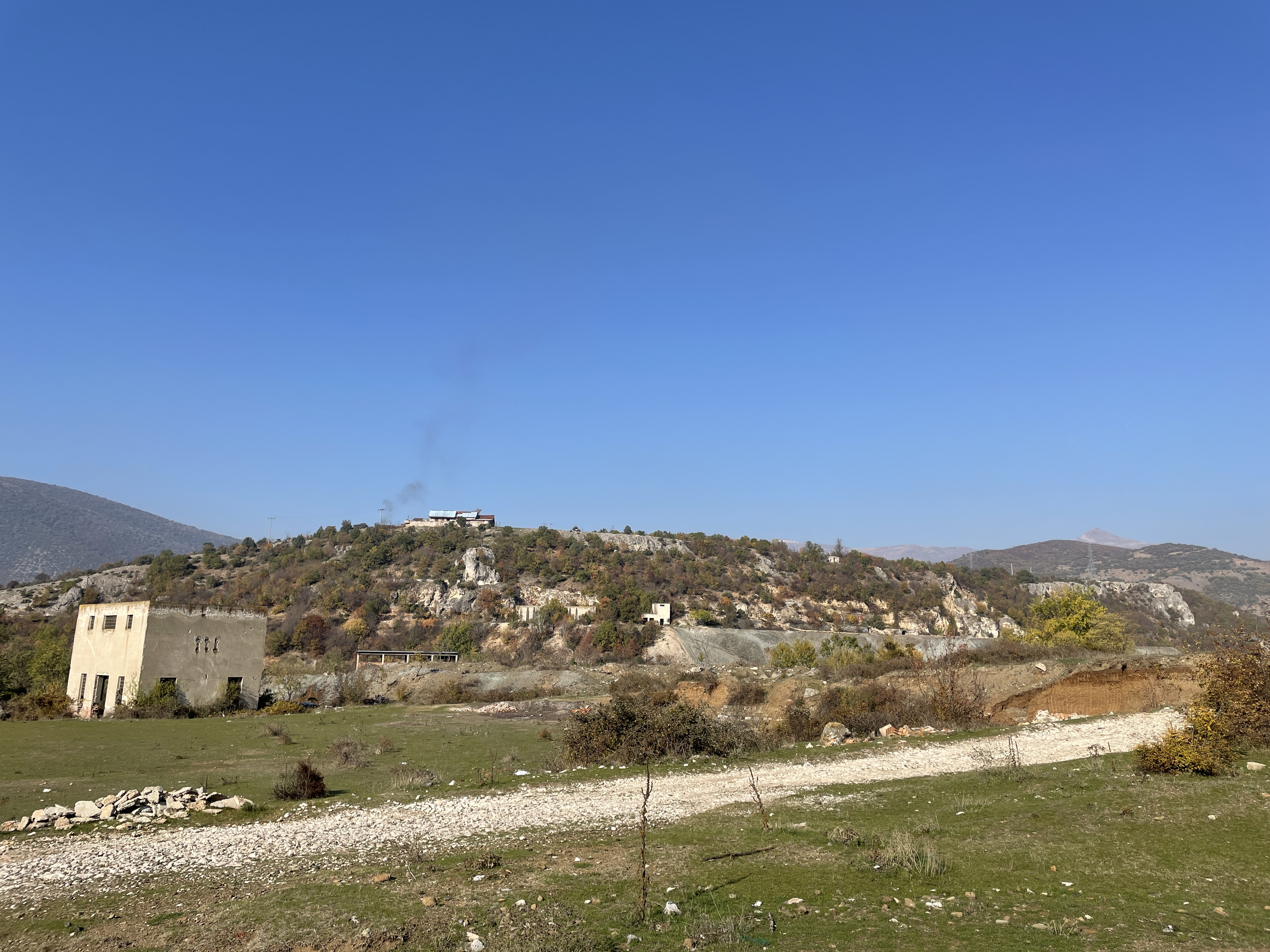
View of the structures of the former mine "Raduša"

The Raduša Mine (Macedonian: Рудник „Радуша“) was a former chromium ore mine located 18 kilometers northwest of the city of Skopje. It served as a crucial source of chromium for Yugoslavia. A mining colony was created around the mine, which is still managed as a separate administrative unit under the name Rudnik Raduša. The mine operated under the framework of the Chemico-Electrometallurgical Combine „Jugokrom“.

== Outline ==
The Raduška massif is the largest (approx. 70 km (43 mi)) and is considered the most ore-bearing. Its submontane section is dominated by dunites and harzburgites, where the most significant ore bodies are found. The central zone of the massif is composed of harzburgites and lherzolites, where chromium mineralisation is insignificant. In the upper section, the dunites are more altered, and mineralisation is more present. The chromite ore bodies are associated with dunites and exhibit simple mineralisation. The total ore reserves amount to 649,905 metric tons. Two notable investigators of chromite in Raduša were Stanko Grafenauer (1949–1954) and Kočo Grčev (c. 1962).

== History ==
The mine was not damaged during the Skopje earthquake in 1963 but all but one of its engineers died in the earthquake. The Raduša mine went bankrupt in 1974. After the mine ceased operations, the mining waste dump site was transformed into Raduša Lake ('Takbol' Reservoir).

== Gallery ==
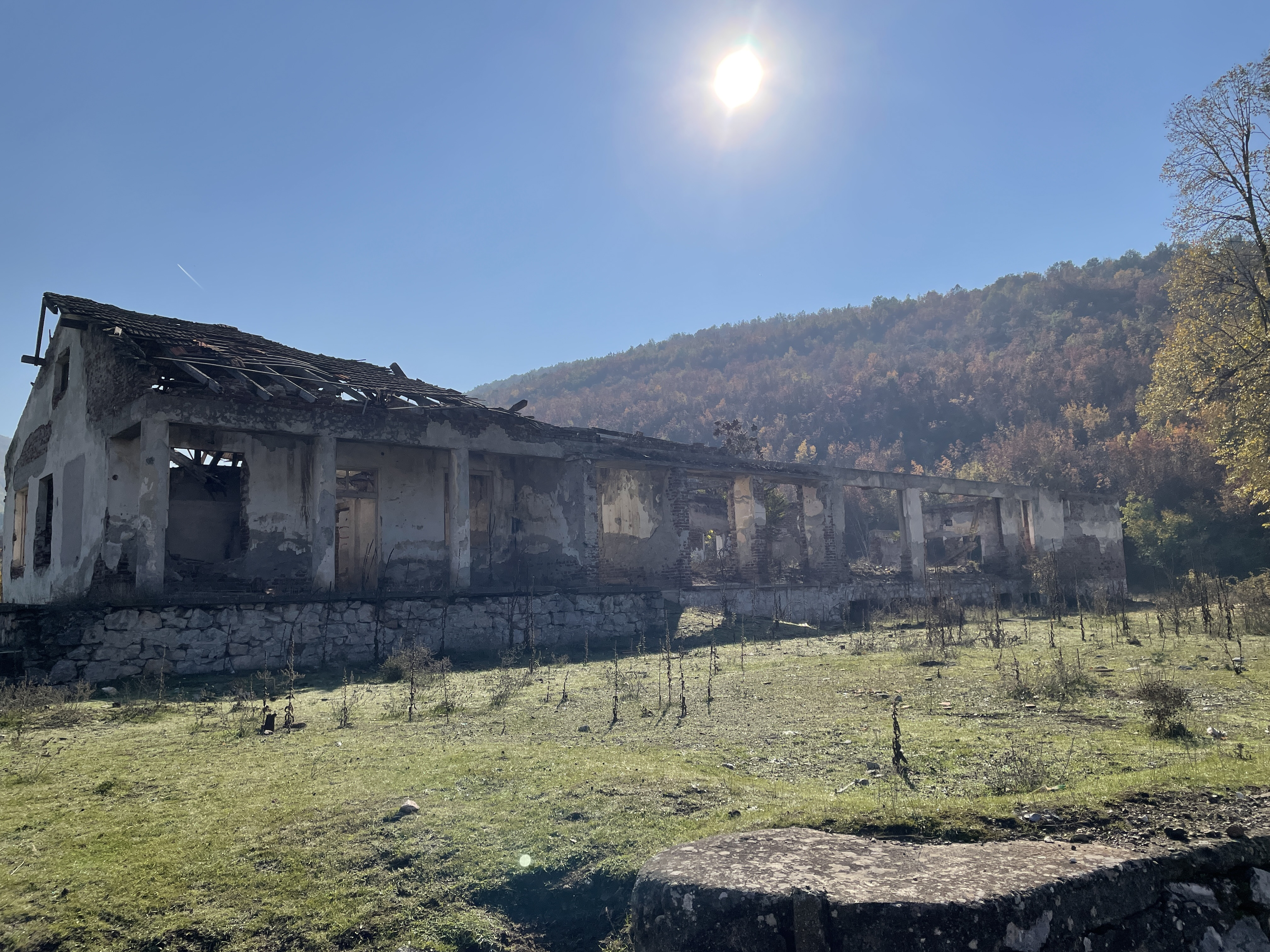
Structure of the former Raduša mine

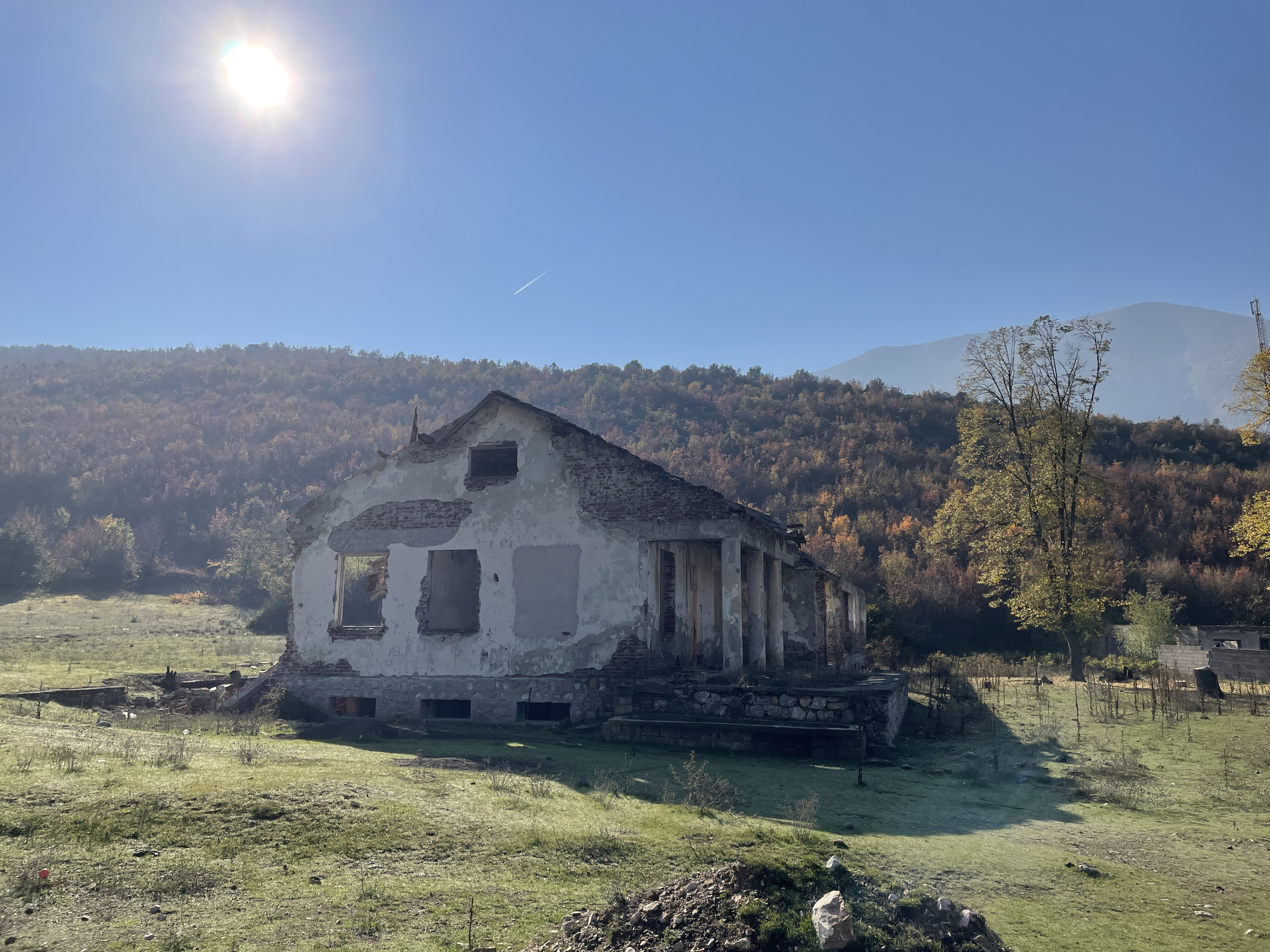
Structure of the former Raduša mine

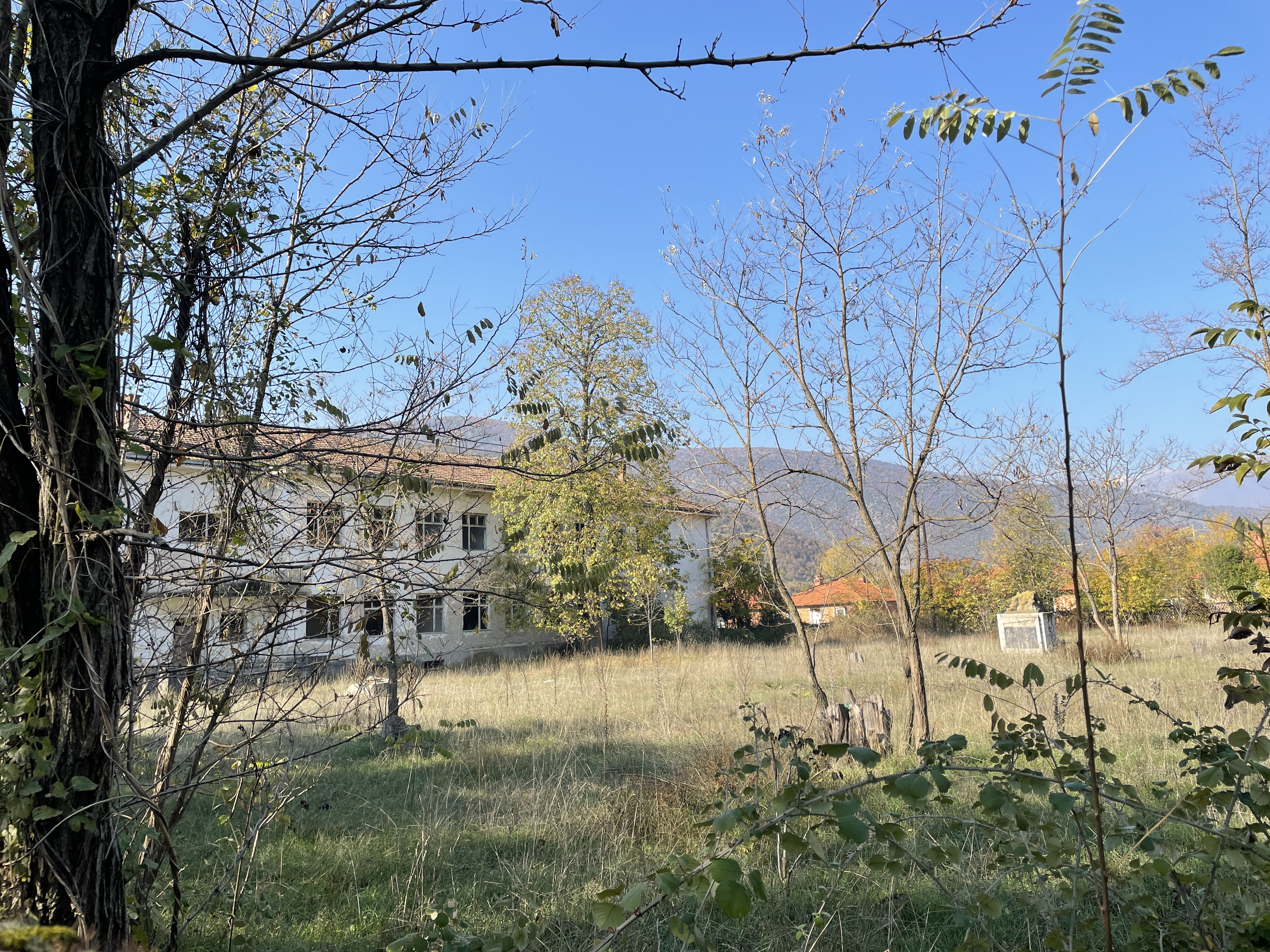
Former administrative building

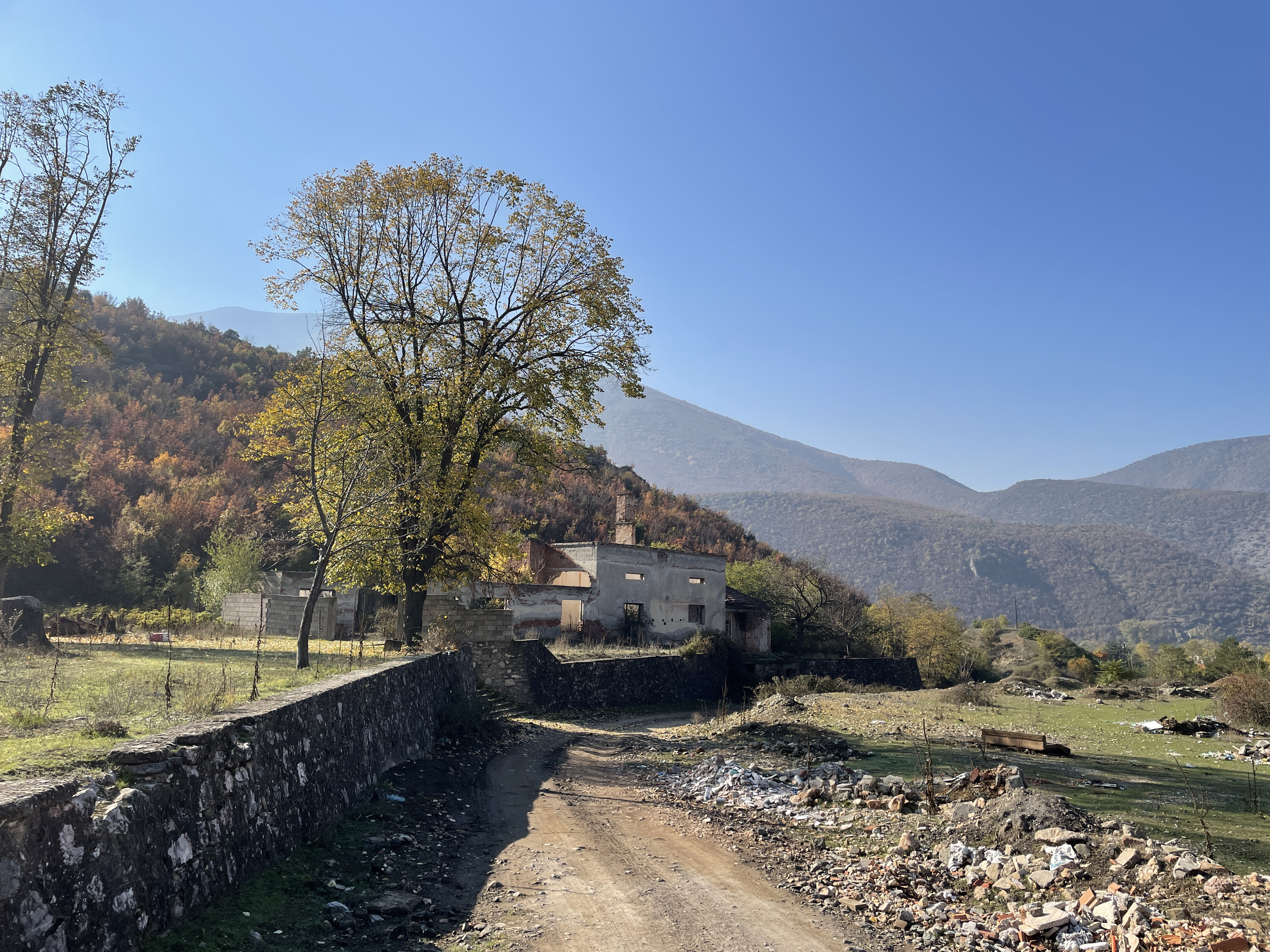
Structure of the former Raduša mine

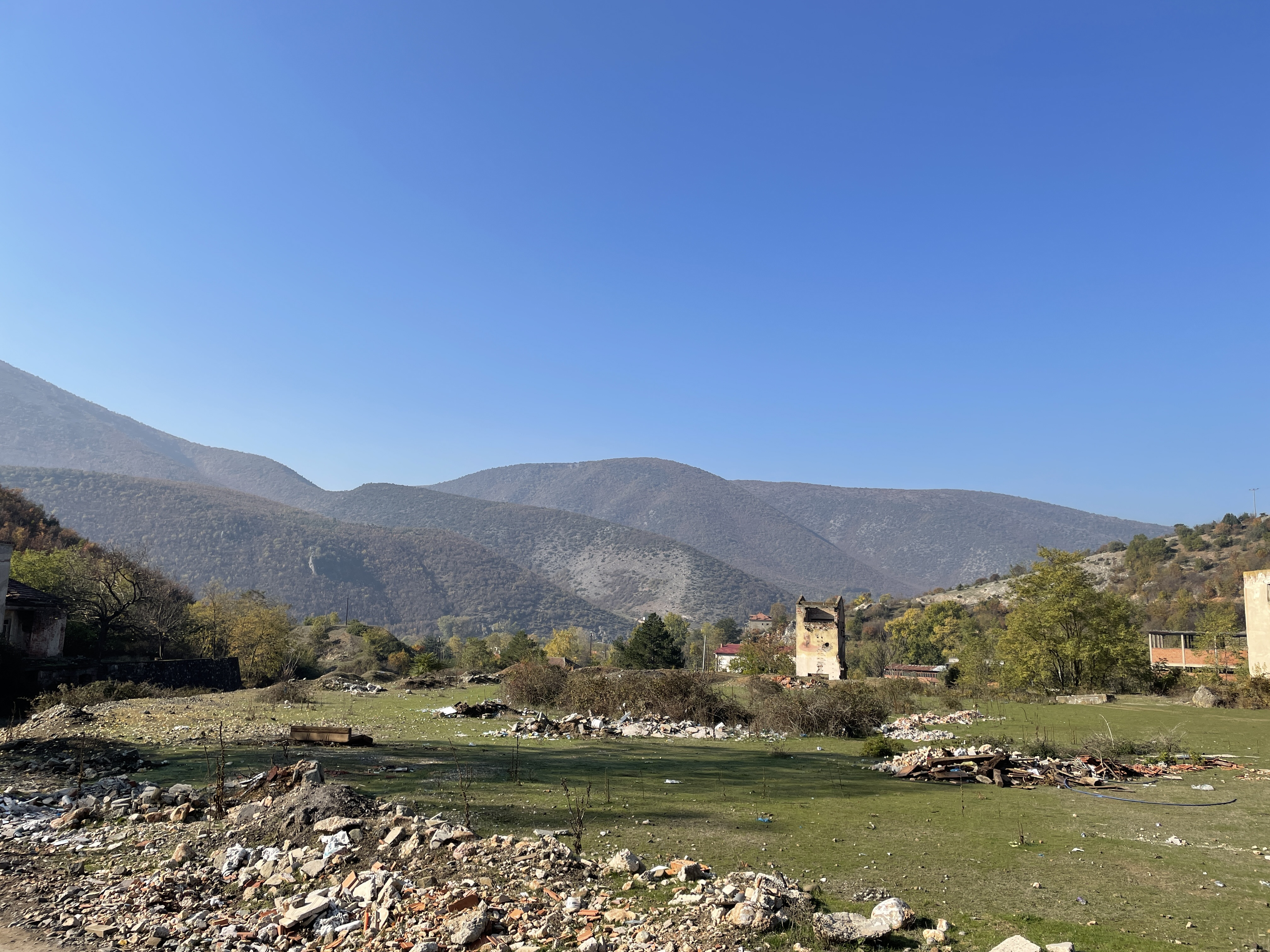
Raduša mine
