= Žeden =

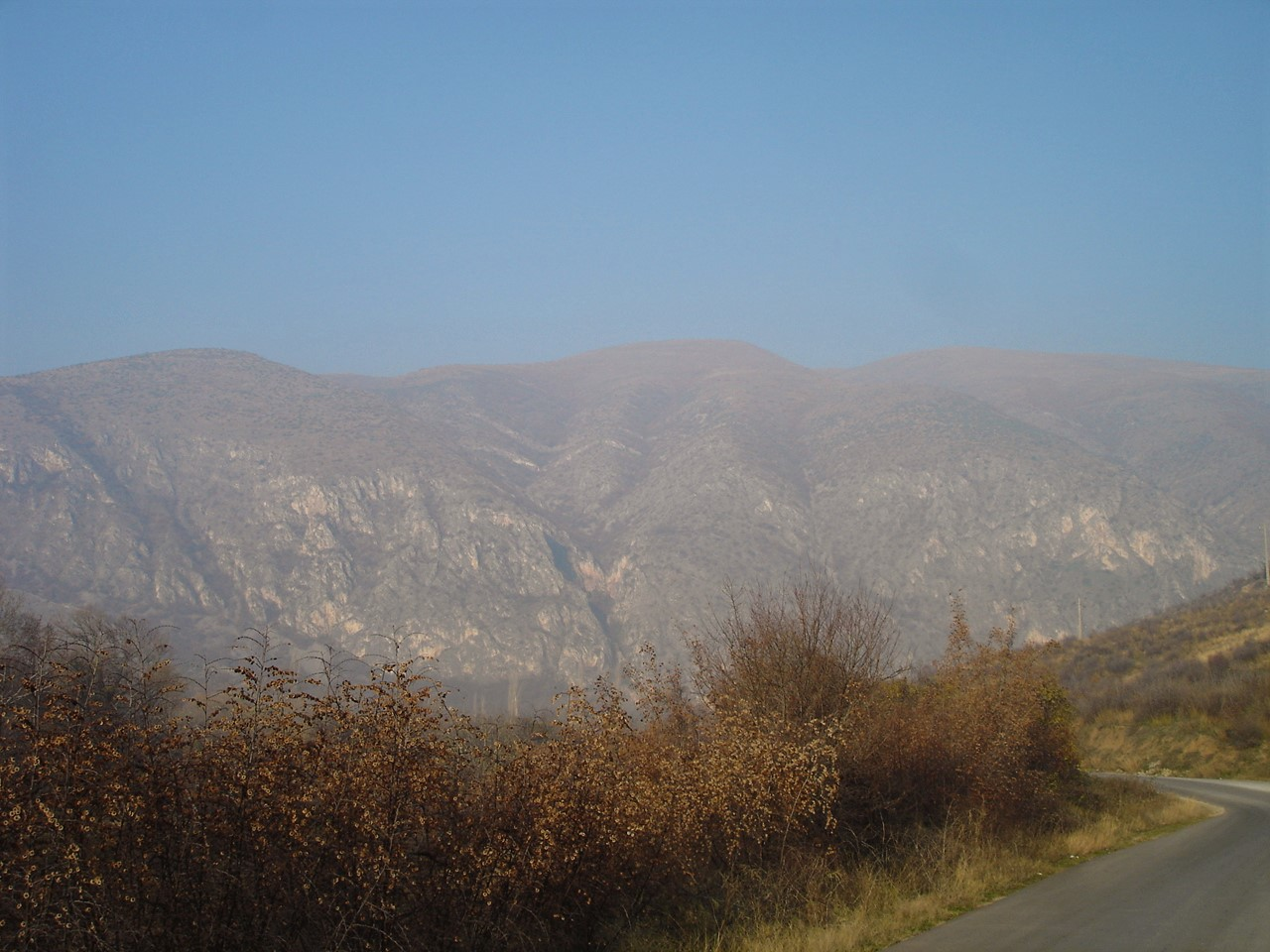
- View of the northern slope of Mount Žeden in the Derven Gorge

Highest point
- Peak: Vodeni Kamen
- Elevation: 1,264 m (4,147 ft)

Dimensions
- Area: 109 km^{2} (42 mi^{2})

Geography
- Location within North Macedonia
- Country: North Macedonia
- Region: Northwestern Macedonia

Žeden (Жеден) is a medium-high mountain massif located in northwestern Macedonia.

== Location and features ==
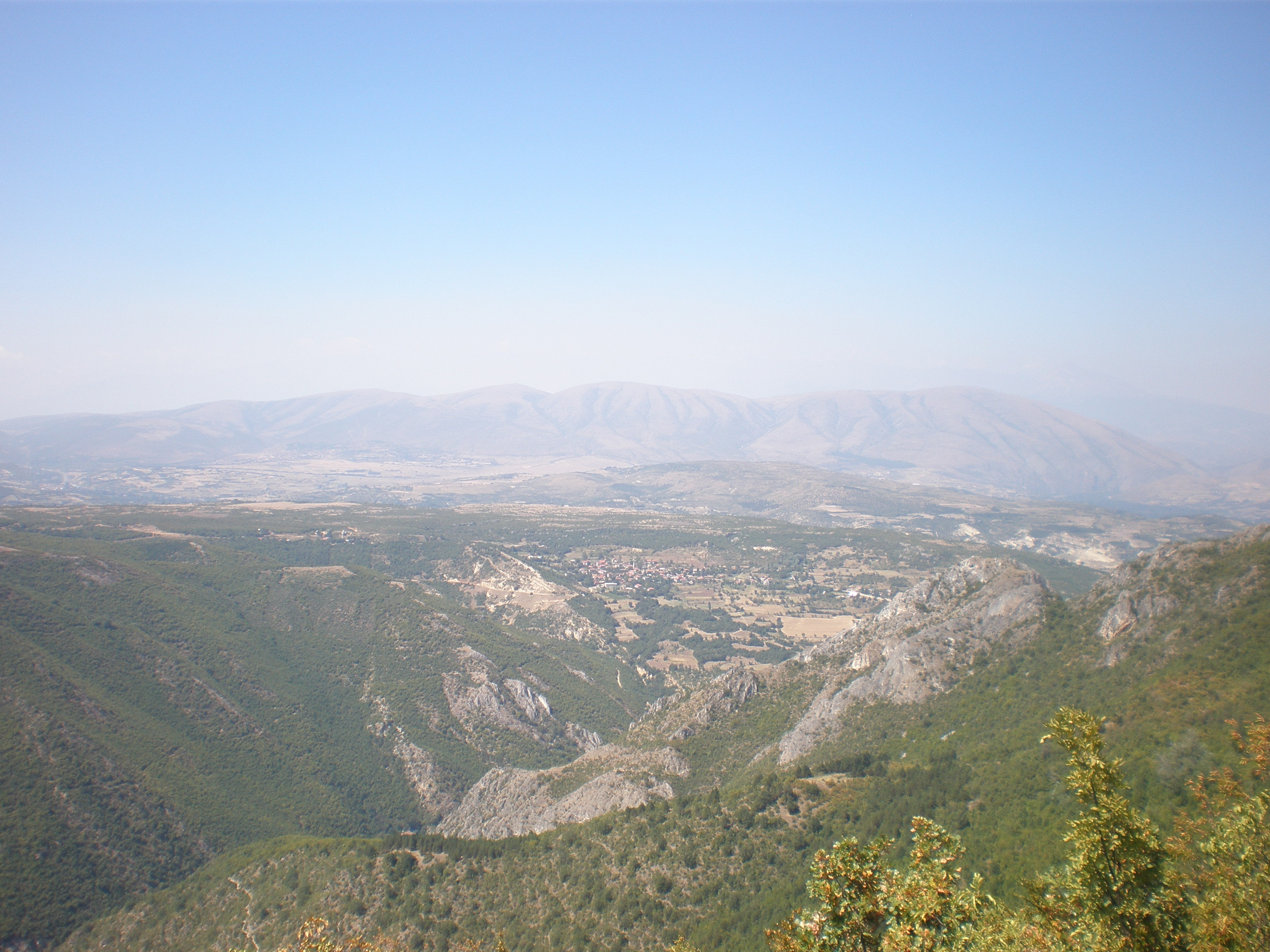
View of Mount Žeden from Matka, above the monastery of St. Nicholas Šiševski

The mountain stretches between the Skopje Valley to the east and the Polog Valley to the west. It is bordered to the north and northeast by the river Vardar and the foothills of the Šar Mountains and the Skopska Crna Gora; to the southeast by Bojansko Pole and Kopaničko Pole - parts of the Skopje Valley, and to the south by the Prigrabska Valley Tetovo Suvodolica. Mount Žeden extends in a southwest–northeast direction and covers a total area of 109 square kilometres (42 sq mi). Its terrain is rounded, and it is crowned by several peaks, with the highest being Vodeni Kamen (1,264 m).

Mount Žeden is abundant with mountain tea, which the people from the surrounding villages call "Žeden Tea."

The mountain lacks dense vegetation and water, as the name "Žeden" suggests, which means "without water" or "thirsty".

Mount Žeden is home to two caves: Dona Duka and Bojanska Peshtera.

The mountain is inhabited by various fauna, including hares, wolves, and other animals.

== Hiking ==
The mountain can be easily hiked in 1–2 hours, which is faster compared to other mountains in western Macedonia, to reach the peak called Vodeni Kamen (Golem Žeden).

== Peaks ==
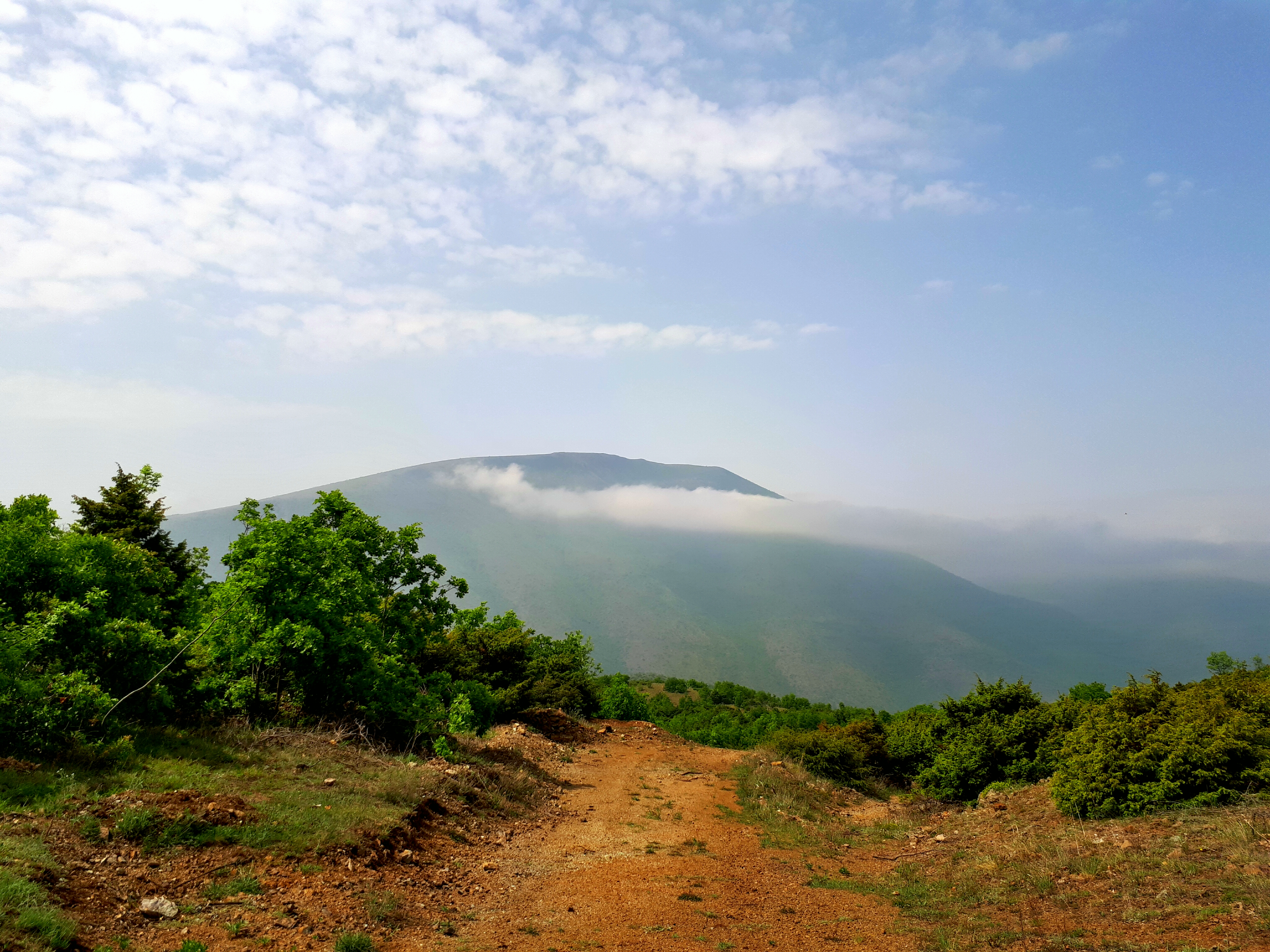
View of Mount Žeden from the road between the villages of Kučkovo and Raduša

Mount Žeden has 4 peaks: Vodeni Kamen (1,264 m (4,147 ft)), Vrvot na Žeden (1,225 m (4,019 ft)), Visoka (1,209 m (3,967 ft)), and Ušajna (1,118 m (3,668 ft)).

Golem Žeden is located in the northern part of the mountain and can be climbed from the villages of Rašče and Raduša. It has a mountain climate with heavy snowfall in winter.

Vrvot na Žeden is situated in the central part of Mount Žeden and can be climbed from Kopanica and Kopance. It has a continental climate with frequent rain showers and heavy snowfall in winter.

Visoka is a peak in the southern part of Mount Žeden and can be climbed from Bojane. It has a continental climate with more rain showers and snowfall in winter.

Ušajna is located in the southern part of Mount Žeden and can also be climbed from Bojane. It has a Mediterranean to continental climate with less precipitation compared to the other two peaks of Žeden.

== Geology ==
The geological composition is characterized by massive marbleised limestone formations lying over crystalline schists.

== Water ==
As the name suggests, Žeden is a waterless mountain, but there are several springs at its foothills. The most significant among them is the Rašče Spring, with a discharge of 6 m^{3}/s, which provides water supply to the city of Skopje.
