= Jugokrom =

Macedonian chemical and metallurgy corporation

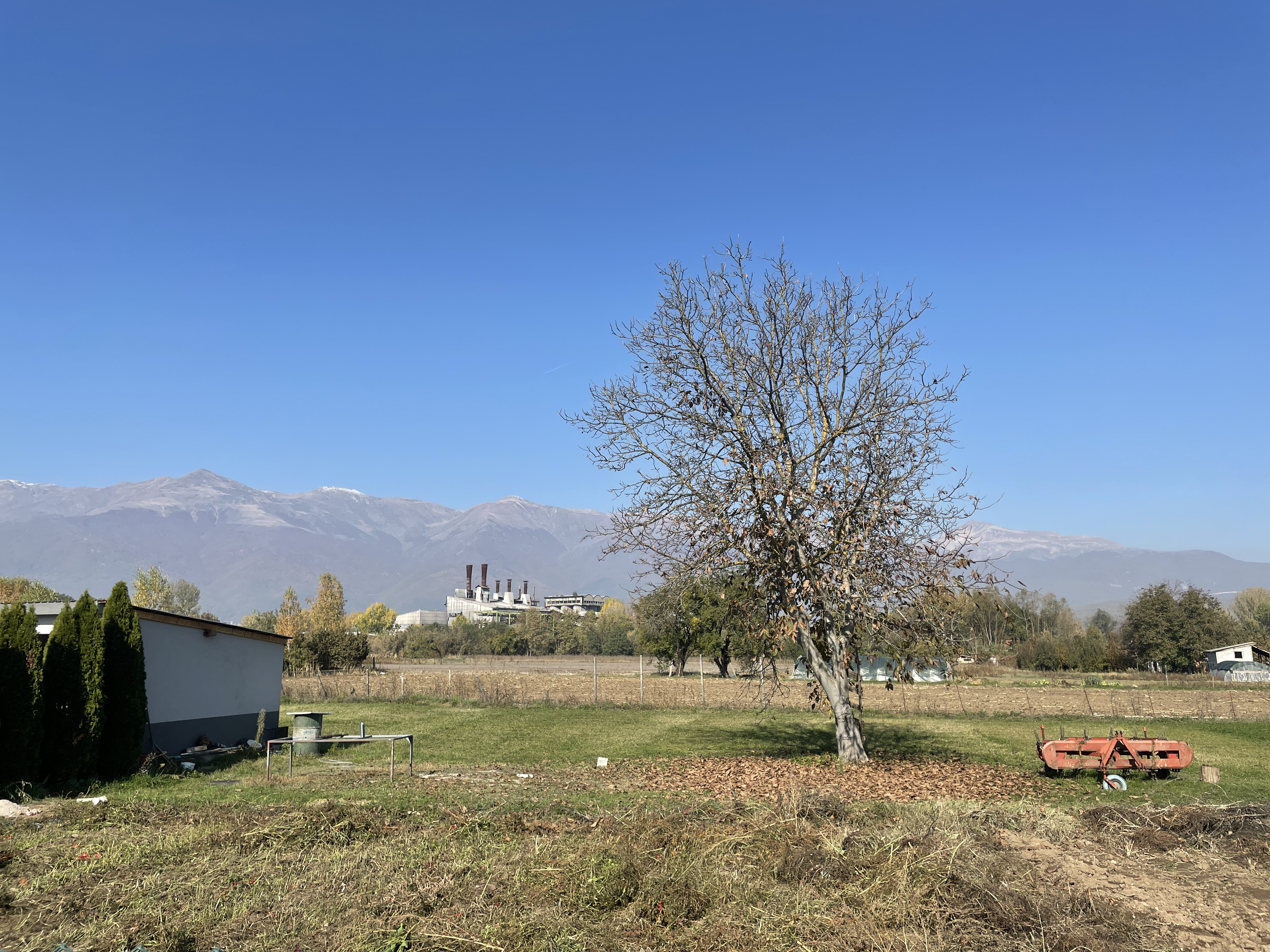
The Jugohrom factory

Chemico-Electrometallurgical Combine "Jugohrom" (abbreviated and commonly known as "Jugohrom"; Macedonian: Хемиско-електрометалуршки комбинат „Југохром“, ХЕК „Југохром“) was one of the largest combines in the industry of Macedonia. At its height, it had approximately 7,000 employees, and prior to its closure in November 2016, it had around 1,000 employees.

The main challenges faced by the combine were a lack of electricity and environmental issues. The combine was closed in November 2016 due to non-compliance with environmental permit requirements.

== History ==
The combine was established by the decision of the Government of the Socialist Republic of Macedonia in 1952 as the Factory for Chrome Products and Ferroalloys (Фабрика за хромни производи и феролегури), with the aim of exploiting the chromium ore from the Ljuboten serpentinite massif using electricity from the newly constructed Mavrovo Hydropower System.

Construction began in 1953, and production started in 1957 with the construction of four electric arc smelting furnaces, although the production of chromium salts had already begun in the "Chemistry" department in 1950.

In the period from 1960 to 1965, the production of calcium carbide and calcium cyanamide began.

The combine continued to be built and expanded until the 1990s when production began to be discontinued in several departments, and some of them were separated and operated as independent units.

After several transformations, in 2000, it continued to operate successfully under the name Silmak.

The main challenge for the combine was the supply of electricity, which was consistently deficient and expensive, and the production of ferroalloys in electric smelting furnaces was one of the largest consumers of electricity.

== Facilities ==
The "Jugokrom" Combine built hotels such as "Slavija" and "Popova Šapka" in the ski center of Popova Šapka, the hotel "Neda" in Galičnik, the hotel "Riviera" in Ohrid, and others.

== Ecology ==
The production of chromium salts has been discontinued due to the harmful effects of hexavalent chromium, which still poses a threat to water pollution in the area of Mount Žeden, where the Rašče Spring originates. In 2020, a plan was presented for the cleanup of the landfill where there are waste materials containing hexavalent chromium, but due to legal obstacles, its implementation has not yet begun.
