= Bučinci =

Bučinci Бучинци
- Village
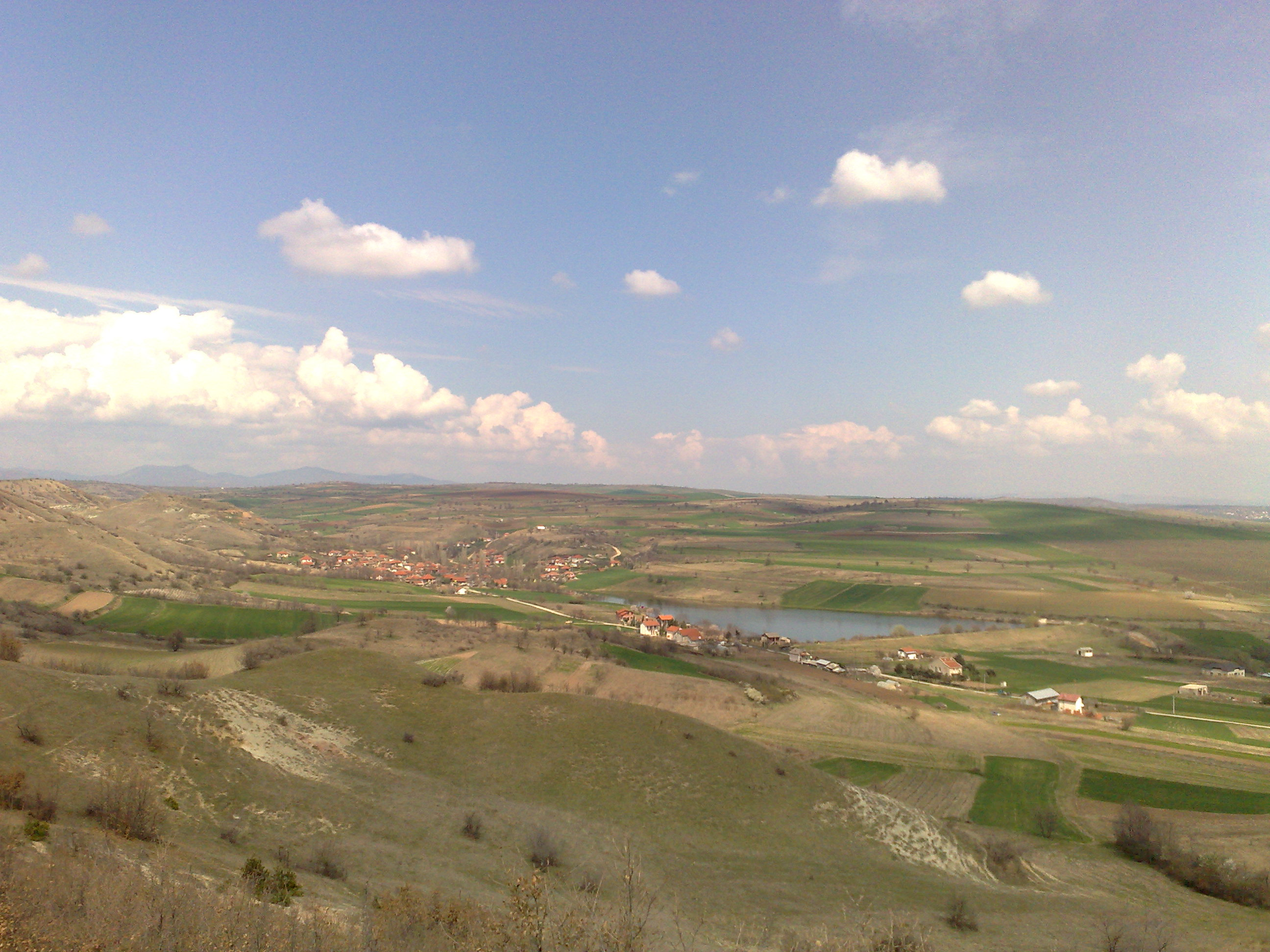

- Location within North Macedonia
- Country: North Macedonia
- Region: Skopje
- Municipality: Ilinden

Population (2021)
  - Total: 235
- Time zone: UTC+1 (CET)
  - Summer (DST): UTC+2 (CEST)
- Car plates: SK
- Website: .

Bučinci (Macedonian: Бучинци) is a village in Ilinden Municipality, North Macedonia.

== Geography and location ==
Bučinci is located in the far eastern part of the Skopje Valley and belongs to the Municipality of Ilinden, and the area reaches the territory of the Municipality of Kumanovo. It is 29 km away from the city of Skopje. The village is flat and lies at 370 meters above sea level. Next to the village, there is a dam with an artificial lake. The village of Bučinci is located at the foot of the hilly area (Ajvatovski Hill) which is a branch of Skopska Crna Gora in the west and the vast plain area in the north, east and south. The area of the village covers 6.8 km^{2} and it is dominated by arable land of 453 hectares, and the pastures cover 198.6 hectares.

== Demographics ==
According to the statistics of the Bulgarian ethnographer Vasil Kanchov from 1900, 160 inhabitants lived in the village of Bučinci, all Bulgarians.

According to the Secretary of the Bulgarian Exarchate Dimitar Mišev ("La Macédoine et sa Population Chrétienne"), in 1905 there were 120 Bulgarians in Bučinci, labelled by him as exarchists.

On his 1927 map of Macedonia, German explorer Leonhard Schultze-Jena shows Bučinci as a village with an unclear ethnic composition.

In 1961, 302 inhabitants lived in the village of Bučinci, but in 1994 the number got reduced and 226 inhabitants lived in the village, exclusively Macedonians.

According to the 2002 census, the village had a total of 226 inhabitants. Ethnic groups in the village include:

- Macedonians 225
- Others 1

As of the 2021 census, Bučinci had 235 residents with the following ethnic composition:

- Macedonians 220
- Persons for whom data are taken from administrative sources 8
- Serbs 5
- Others 2
