= Semenište =

Semenište Семениште Semenisht
- Village
- Location within North Macedonia
- Coordinates: 41°58′N 21°16′E
- Country: North Macedonia
- Region: Skopje
- Municipality: Saraj

Population (2021)
  - Total: 798
- Time zone: UTC+1 (CET)
  - Summer (DST): UTC+2 (CEST)
- Car plates: SK
- Website: .

Semenište (Macedonian: Семениште, Albanian: Semenisht) is a village in the municipality of Saraj, North Macedonia.

== Demographics ==
According to the 2021 census, the village had a total of 798 inhabitants. Ethnic groups in the village include:

- Albanians 754
- Macedonians 2
- Bosniaks 5
- Others 37

Year	Macedonian	Albanian	Turks	Romani	Vlachs	Serbs	Bosniaks	Others	Total
2002	1	557	...	...	...	...	1	...	559
2021	2	754	...	...	...	...	5	37	798
