= Matka, Saraj =

Matka Матка Matkë
- Village
- Location within North Macedonia
- Coordinates: 41°58′N 21°17′E
- Country: North Macedonia
- Region: Skopje
- Municipality: Saraj

Population (2021)
  - Total: 466
- Time zone: UTC+1 (CET)
  - Summer (DST): UTC+2 (CEST)
- Car plates: SK
- Website: .

Matka (Macedonian: Матка, Albanian: Matkë) is a village in the municipality of Saraj, North Macedonia.

== History ==
In statistics gathered by Vasil Kanchov in 1900, the village of Matka was inhabited by 120 Muslim Albanians and 60 Christian Bulgarians Albanians. In 1905 Dimitar Mishev Brancoff gathered statistics about the Christian population of Macedonia, in which the village of Matka appears as consisting of 56 Bulgarian Exarchists and 42 Christian Albanians.

== Demographics ==
According to the 2021 census, the village had a total of 466 inhabitants. Ethnic groups in the village include:

- Albanians 248
- Macedonians 157
- Bosniaks 5
- Serbs 1
- Others 55

Year	Macedonian	Albanian	Turks	Romani	Vlachs	Serbs	Bosniaks	Others	Total
2002	167	300	...	...	...	1	...	...	468
2021	157	248	...	...	...	1	5	55	466

== See also ==
- Matka Canyon
