= Čajlane =

Čajlane Чајлане Çajlanë
- Village
- Location within North Macedonia
- Coordinates: 41°58′N 21°15′E
- Country: North Macedonia
- Region: Skopje
- Municipality: Saraj

Population (2021)
  - Total: 639
- Time zone: UTC+1 (CET)
  - Summer (DST): UTC+2 (CEST)
- Car plates: SK
- Website: .

Čajlane (Macedonian: Чајлане, Albanian: Çajlanë) is a village in the municipality of Saraj, North Macedonia.

== Demographics ==
According to the 1467-68 Ottoman defter, Čajlane appears as being inhabited by an Orthodox Albanian population. Some families had a mixed Slav-Albanian anthroponomy - usually a Slavic first name and an Albanian last name or last names with Albanian patronyms and Slavic suffixes.

The names are: Gjini star (old man), Nikola the son of Gjin, Gjurko the son of Gjin, Nikola the son of Dan-ko, Dimitri his brother, Rada the son of Dral, Radoslav the son of Sotir, Dan-ço son of Vlad, Gjurja his brother, Stanisha son of Dopsi, Gjuro his brother.

According to the 2021 census, the village had a total of 639 inhabitants. Ethnic groups in the village include:

- Albanians 602
- Others 37

Year	Macedonian	Albanian	Turks	Romani	Vlachs	Serbs	Bosniaks	Others	Total
2002	...	577	...	...	...	...	2	1	580
2021	...	602	...	...	...	...	...	37	639
