= Ljubin =

Ljubin Љубин Lubin
- Village
- Location within North Macedonia
- Coordinates: 42°00′N 21°19′E
- Country: North Macedonia
- Region: Skopje
- Municipality: Saraj

Population (2021)
  - Total: 2.426
- Time zone: UTC+1 (CET)
  - Summer (DST): UTC+2 (CEST)
- Car plates: SK
- Website: .

Ljubin (Macedonian: Љубин, Albanian: Lubin) is a village in the municipality of Saraj, North Macedonia.

== Demographics ==
According to the 2021 census, the village had a total of 2.426 inhabitants. Ethnic groups in the village include:

- Albanians 1.493
- Bosniaks 859
- Macedonians 4
- Turks 5
- Romani people 1
- Others 64

Year	Macedonian	Albanian	Turks	Romani	Vlachs	Serbs	Bosniaks	Others	Total
2002	4	1.099	3	...	...	...	914	24	2.044
2021	4	1.493	5	1	...	...	859	64	2.426
