= Laskarci =

Laskarci Ласкарци Llaskarcë
- Village
- Location within North Macedonia
- Coordinates: 41°58′N 21°13′E
- Country: North Macedonia
- Region: Skopje
- Municipality: Saraj

Population (2021)
  - Total: 1,169
- Time zone: UTC+1 (CET)
  - Summer (DST): UTC+2 (CEST)
- Car plates: SK
- Website: .

Laskarci (Macedonian: Ласкарци, Albanian: Llaskarcë) is a village in the municipality of Saraj, North Macedonia.

== Demographics ==
According to the 2021 census, the village had a total of 1.169 inhabitants. Ethnic groups in the village include:

- Albanians 1.127
- Others 42

Year	Macedonian	Albanian	Turks	Romani	Vlachs	Serbs	Bosniaks	Others	Total
2002	...	1.189	...	...	...	...	...	1	1.190
2021	...	1.127	...	...	...	...	...	42	1.169
