= Paničari =

Paničari Паничари Paniçar
- Village
- Location within North Macedonia
- Coordinates: 41°57′N 21°13′E
- Country: North Macedonia
- Region: Skopje
- Municipality: Saraj

Population (2021)
  - Total: 130
- Time zone: UTC+1 (CET)
  - Summer (DST): UTC+2 (CEST)
- Car plates: SK
- Website: .

Paničari (Macedonian: Паничари, Albanian: Paniçar) is a village in the municipality of Saraj, North Macedonia.

== Demographics ==
According to the 2021 census, the village had a total of 130 inhabitants. Ethnic groups in the village include:

- Albanians 107
- Others 23

Year	Macedonian	Albanian	Turks	Romani	Vlachs	Serbs	Bosniaks	Others	Total
2002	...	260	...	...	...	...	...	1	261
2021	...	107	...	...	...	...	...	23	130
