= Saraj Municipality =

Municipality of Northern Macedonia

Coordinates: 42.0004°N 21.3248°E

Municipality of Saraj Општина Сарај Komuna e Sarajit
- Rural municipality
- Flag Coat of arms

- Country: North Macedonia
- Region: Skopje
- Municipal seat: Saraj

Government
  - Mayor: Muhamet Elmazi (VLEN)

Area
  - Total: 229.06 km^{2} (88.44 sq mi)

Population
  - Total: 38,399

Official Language(s)
  - primary: Macedonian, Albanian
- Time zone: UTC+1 (CET)
- Website: Official Website

Saraj (Macedonian: Сарај, Albanian: Saraj) is one of the ten municipalities that make up the city of Skopje, the capital of the Republic of North Macedonia.

- Saraj, which means "palace" in Turkish, is also the name of the village where the municipal seat is found.
  - It is a rural municipality and it is not part of the urban core of Skopje proper.

== Geography ==
Saraj borders

- Jegunovce Municipality to the northwest,
- Želino Municipality to the southwest,
- Sopište Municipality to the south,
- Karpoš Municipality and Ǵorče Petrov Municipality to the east, and
- Kosovo to the north.

== History ==
In the early 2000s municipal boundaries within Macedonia in some areas were redrawn. During difficult negotiations the governing Macedonian Social Democrats (SDSM) gave in to the request of its Albanian coalition partner that wanted Albanians within Skopje to surpass the 20% population mark by attaching two rural Albanian inhabited municipalities, Saraj and Kondovo. The municipalities attachment to the capital city raised the Albanian population from 15.30% to 20.49%. The change was seen as an important win among Albanians, while Macedonians were concerned with a more visible Albanian presence in Skopje and the increasing fragmentation of the urban population based on ethnicity.

== Demographics ==
According to the 2021 North Macedonia census, Saraj municipality has 38,399 inhabitants. Ethnic groups in the municipality include:

	2002		2021	
	Number	%	Number	%
TOTAL	35,408	100	38,399	100
Albanians	32,408	91.53	34,586	90.07
Bosniaks	1,120	3.16	1,043	2.72
Macedonians	1,377	3.89	1,005	2.62
Roma	273	0.77	255	0.66
Turks	45	0.13	28	0.07
Serbs	18	0.05	10	0.03
Vlachs			4	0.01
Other / Undeclared / Unknown	167	0.47	18	0.04
Persons for whom data are taken from administrative sources			1,450	3.78

== Inhabited places ==
There are 23 inhabited places in this municipality.

Inhabited Places	Total	Macedonians	Albanians	Turks	Roma	Vlachs	Serbs	Bosnians	Others
Saraj Municipality	38,399	1,005	34,586	28	255	-	-	1,043	1,466
Arnakija	1.163	5	1.086	-	-	-	-	-	71
Bojane	2.132	1	2.070	-	-	-	-	-	60
Bukoviḱ	1.842	-	1.769	-	-	-	-	-	73
Čajlane	639	-	602	1	-	-	-	-	37
Dolno Svilare	2.172	-	2.128	-	-	-	-	-	46
Dvorce	145	-	141	-	-	-	-	-	4
Glumovo	2.152	1	2.060	-	-	-	-	32	59
Gorno Svilare	845	-	830	-	-	-	-	-	15
Grčec	36	-	3	-	-	-	-	-	33
Kondovo	3.626	18	3.353	9	-	-	2	66	177
Kopanica	1.790	-	1.761	-	-	-	-	-	29
Krušopek	2.017	4	1.977	-	-	-	-	1	35
Laskarci	1.169	-	1.127	-	-	-	-	-	42
Ljubin	2.426	5	1.493	5	1	-	-	859	64
Matka	466	156	248	-	-	-	1	5	55
Paničari	130	-	107	-	-	-	-	-	23
Raduša	1.533	-	1.447	-	-	-	-	-	86
Raoviḱ	79	-	40	-	-	-	-	-	39
Rašče	2.835	1	2.760	-	-	-	-	-	74
Rudnik Raduša	179	-	156	-	-	-	-	-	23
Saraj	6.265	307	5.379	11	167	-	4	73	324
Semenište	798	2	754	9	-	-	-	5	37
Šiševo	3.958	505	3.294	2	87	4	3	2	61

== Twin towns ==
=== Twin municipalities ===
- (Turkey) Üsküdar, Istanbul
- (Turkey) Kırşehir
