= Krušopek =

Krušopek Крушопек Krushapek
- Village
- Location within North Macedonia
- Coordinates: 41°59′50″N 21°20′42″E
- Country: North Macedonia
- Region: Skopje
- Municipality: Saraj

Population (2021)
  - Total: 2,017
- Time zone: UTC+1 (CET)
  - Summer (DST): UTC+2 (CEST)
- Car plates: SK
- Website: .

Krušopek (Macedonian: Крушопек, Albanian: Krushapek) is a village in the municipality of Saraj, North Macedonia.

== Demographics ==
According to the 2021 census, the village had a total of 2.017 inhabitants. Ethnic groups in the village include:

- Albanians 1.977
- Macedonians 4
- Bosniaks 1
- Others 35

Year	Macedonian	Albanian	Turks	Romani	Vlachs	Serbs	Bosniaks	Others	Total
2002	...	1.899	...	...	...	...	...	3	1.902
2021	4	1.977	...	...	...	...	1	35	2.017
