= Raoviḱ =

Raoviḱ Раовиќ Rahoviq
- Village
- Location within North Macedonia
- Coordinates: 41°56′37″N 21°13′02″E
- Country: North Macedonia
- Region: Skopje
- Municipality: Saraj

Population (2021)
  - Total: 79
- Time zone: UTC+1 (CET)
  - Summer (DST): UTC+2 (CEST)
- Car plates: SK
- Website: .

Raoviḱ (Macedonian: Раовиќ, Albanian: Rahoviq) is a village in the municipality of Saraj, North Macedonia.

== Demographics ==
According to the 2021 census, the village had a total of 79 inhabitants. Ethnic groups in the village include:

- Albanians 40
- Others 39

Year	Macedonian	Albanian	Turks	Romani	Vlachs	Serbs	Bosniaks	Others	Total
2002	...	213	...	...	...	...	...	...	213
2021	...	40	...	...	...	...	...	39	79
