= Grčec =

Grčec Грчец Gërçec
- Village
- Location within North Macedonia
- Coordinates: 41°59′N 21°20′E
- Country: North Macedonia
- Region: Skopje
- Municipality: Saraj

Population (2021)
  - Total: 36
- Time zone: UTC+1 (CET)
  - Summer (DST): UTC+2 (CEST)
- Car plates: SK
- Website: .

Grčec (Macedonian: Грчец, Albanian: Gërçec) is a village in the municipality of Saraj, North Macedonia.

== Demographics ==
The 1981 Yugoslav census recorded 1,315 inhabitants of which 1,207 were Albanians, 49 Turks, 35 Macedonians and 24 others. The 1994 Macedonian census recorded 1,805 inhabitants of which 1,768 were Albanians, 5 Turks, 30 Macedonians and 2 others. According to the 2021 census, the village had 36 inhabitants.

- Albanians 3
- Others 33

Year	Macedonian	Albanian	Turks	Romani	Vlachs	Serbs	Bosniaks	Others	Total
1981	35	1.207	49	...	...	...	...	29	1.305
1994	30	1.768	5	...	...	...	...	2	1.805
2002	1	...	...	...	...	...	...	..	1
2021	...	3	...	...	...	...	...	33	36
