= Arnakija =

Arnakija Арнакија Arnaqi
- Village
- Location within North Macedonia
- Coordinates: 41°59′10″N 21°16′38″E
- Country: North Macedonia
- Region: Skopje
- Municipality: Saraj

Population (2021)
  - Total: 1,163
- Time zone: UTC+1 (CET)
  - Summer (DST): UTC+2 (CEST)
- Car plates: SK
- Website: .

Arnakija (Macedonian: Арнакија, Albanian: Arnaqi) is a village in the municipality of Saraj, North Macedonia.

== Demographics ==
According to the 2021 census, the village had a total of 1.163 inhabitants. Ethnic groups in the village include:

- Albanians 1.086
- Macedonians 5
- Others 71

Year	Macedonian	Albanian	Turks	Romani	Vlachs	Serbs	Bosniaks	Others	Total
2002	4	1.063	1	...	...	...	9	4	1.077
2021	5	1.086	...	...	...	...	...	71	1.163
