= Kopanica, Saraj =

Kopanica Копаница Kopanicë
- Village
- Location within North Macedonia
- Coordinates: 42°00′25″N 21°14′15″E
- Country: North Macedonia
- Region: Skopje
- Municipality: Saraj

Population (2021)
  - Total: 1,790
- Time zone: UTC+1 (CET)
  - Summer (DST): UTC+2 (CEST)
- Car plates: SK
- Website: .

Kopanica (Macedonian: Копаница, Albanian: Kopanicë) is a village in the municipality of Saraj, North Macedonia.

== History ==
According to the 1467-68 Ottoman defter, Kopanica exhibits Orthodox Christian Slavic anthroponomy.

== Demographics ==
According to the 2021 census, the village had a total of 1.790 inhabitants. Ethnic groups in the village include:

- Albanians 2000

Year	Macedonian	Albanian	Turks	Romani	Vlachs	Serbs	Bosniaks	Others	Total
2002		1714	...	...	...	...			
2021	...	1790	...	...	...	...	...	1.790	
