= Dvorce, Saraj =

Vorcë Дворце Dvorcё
- Village
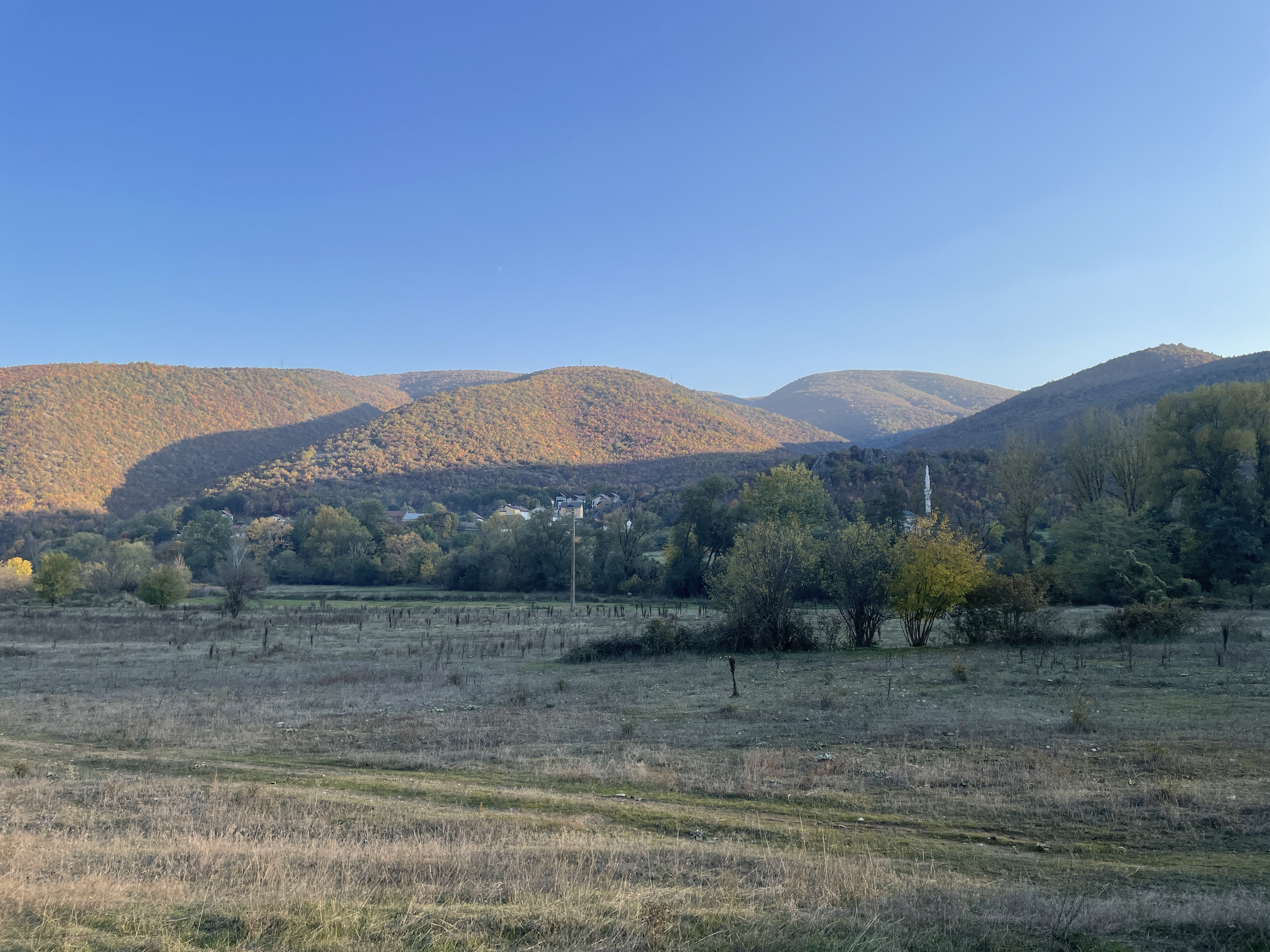
- View of the village

- Location within North Macedonia
- Coordinates: 42°05′53″N 21°09′42″E
- Country: North Macedonia
- Region: Skopje
- Municipality: Saraj

Population (2021)
  - Total: 145
- Time zone: UTC+1 (CET)
  - Summer (DST): UTC+2 (CEST)
- Car plates: SK
- Website: .

Dvorce (Macedonian: Дворце, Albanian: Dvorcё) is a village in the municipality of Saraj, North Macedonia.

== Demographics ==
According to the 2021 census, the village had a total of 145 inhabitants. Ethnic groups in the village include:

- Albanians 141
- Others 4

Year	Macedonian	Albanian	Turks	Romani	Vlachs	Serbs	Bosniaks	Others	Total
2002	...	249	...	...	...	...	...	...	249
2021	...	141	...	...	...	...	...	4	145
