= Saraj, Skopje =

Saraj Сарај
- Village
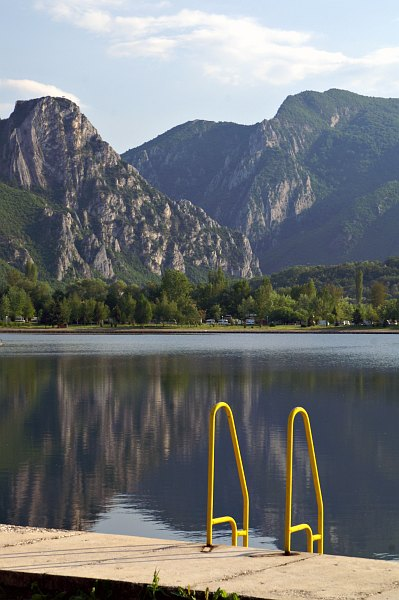
- Lake Treska in Saraj

- Location within North Macedonia
- Coordinates: 42°00′00″N 21°19′30″E
- Country: North Macedonia
- Region: Skopje
- Municipality: Saraj

Population (2021)
  - Total: 6,265
- Time zone: UTC+1 (CET)
  - Summer (DST): UTC+2 (CEST)
- Car plates: SK
- Website: .

Saraj (Macedonian: Сарај, Albanian: Saraj) is a village in Skopje, within North Macedonia. It is the seat of Saraj Municipality.

== Demographics ==
According to the 2021 census, the village had a total of 6265 inhabitants.

Ethnic groups in the village include:

- Albanians 5379
- Macedonians 307
- Romani 167
- Bosniaks 73
- Turks 11
- Serbs 4
- Others 1

Year	Macedonian	Albanian	Turks	Romani	Vlachs	Serbs	Bosniaks	Others	Persons for whom data are taken from administrative sources	Total
1953	347	34	102	62	—	14	...	6		565
1961	460	294	177	...	...	21	...	63		1.015
2002	578	4.294	15	213	—	12	78	42		5.232
2021	307	5.379	11	167	...	4	73	1	323	6.265

== See also ==
- Saraj Municipality
- Skopje
