= Glumovo, Saraj =

Glumovo Глумово Gllumovë
- Village
- Location within North Macedonia
- Coordinates: 41°59′N 21°18′E
- Country: North Macedonia
- Region: Skopje
- Municipality: Saraj

Population (2021)
  - Total: 2,152
- Time zone: UTC+1 (CET)
  - Summer (DST): UTC+2 (CEST)
- Car plates: SK
- Website: .

Glumovo (Macedonian: Глумово, Albanian: Gllumovë) is a village in the municipality of Saraj, North Macedonia.

== Demographics ==
According to the 2021 census, the village had a total of 2.153 inhabitants. Ethnic groups in the village include:

- Albanians 2.060
- Bosniaks 32
- Macedonians 1
- Others 59

Year	Macedonian	Albanian	Turks	Romani	Vlachs	Serbs	Bosniaks	Others	Total
2002	4	1.646	1	...	...	1	28	3	1.683
2021	1	2.060	...	...	...	...	32	59	2.152
