= Mavrovo Hydropower System =

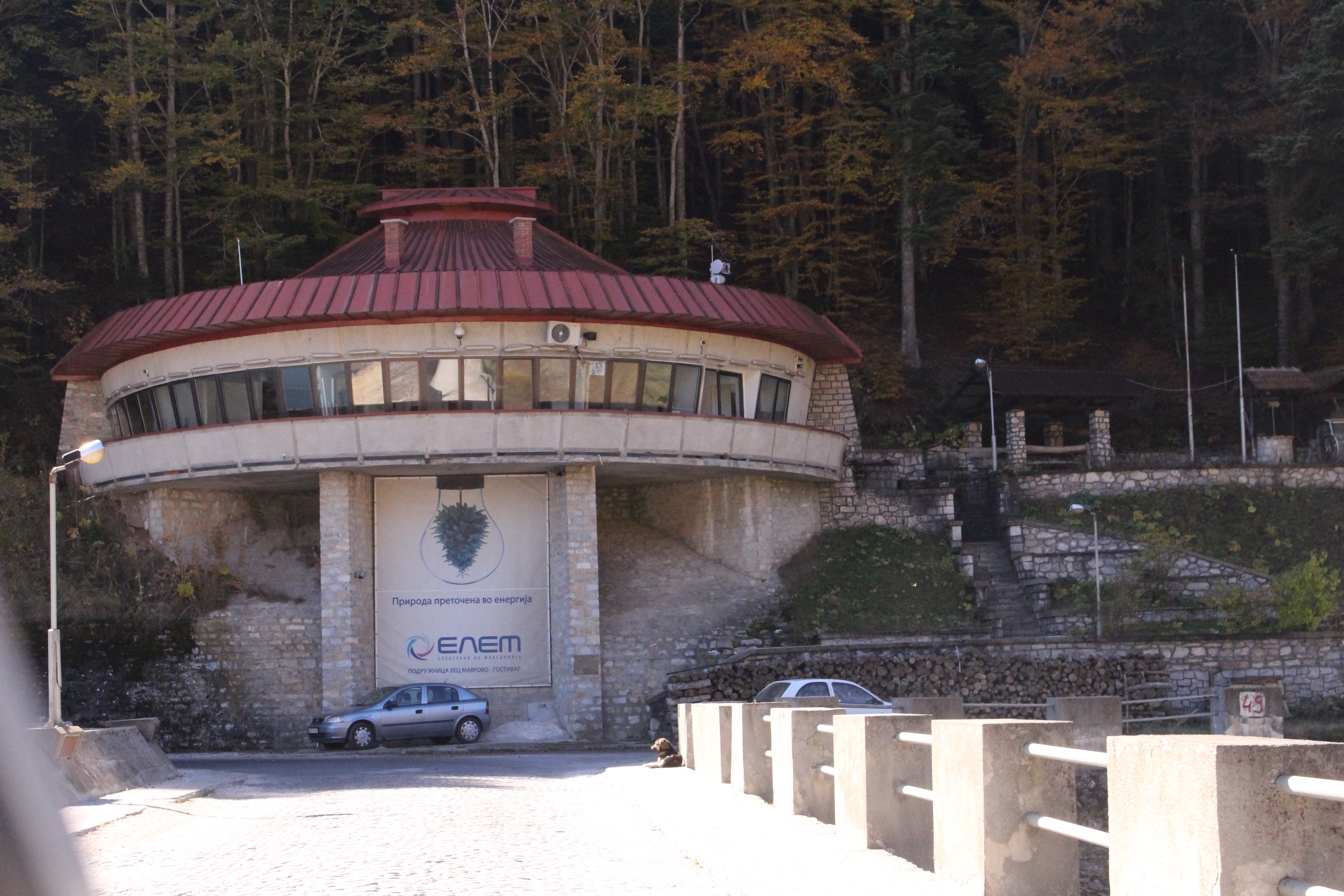
The control tower near Mavrovo Dam

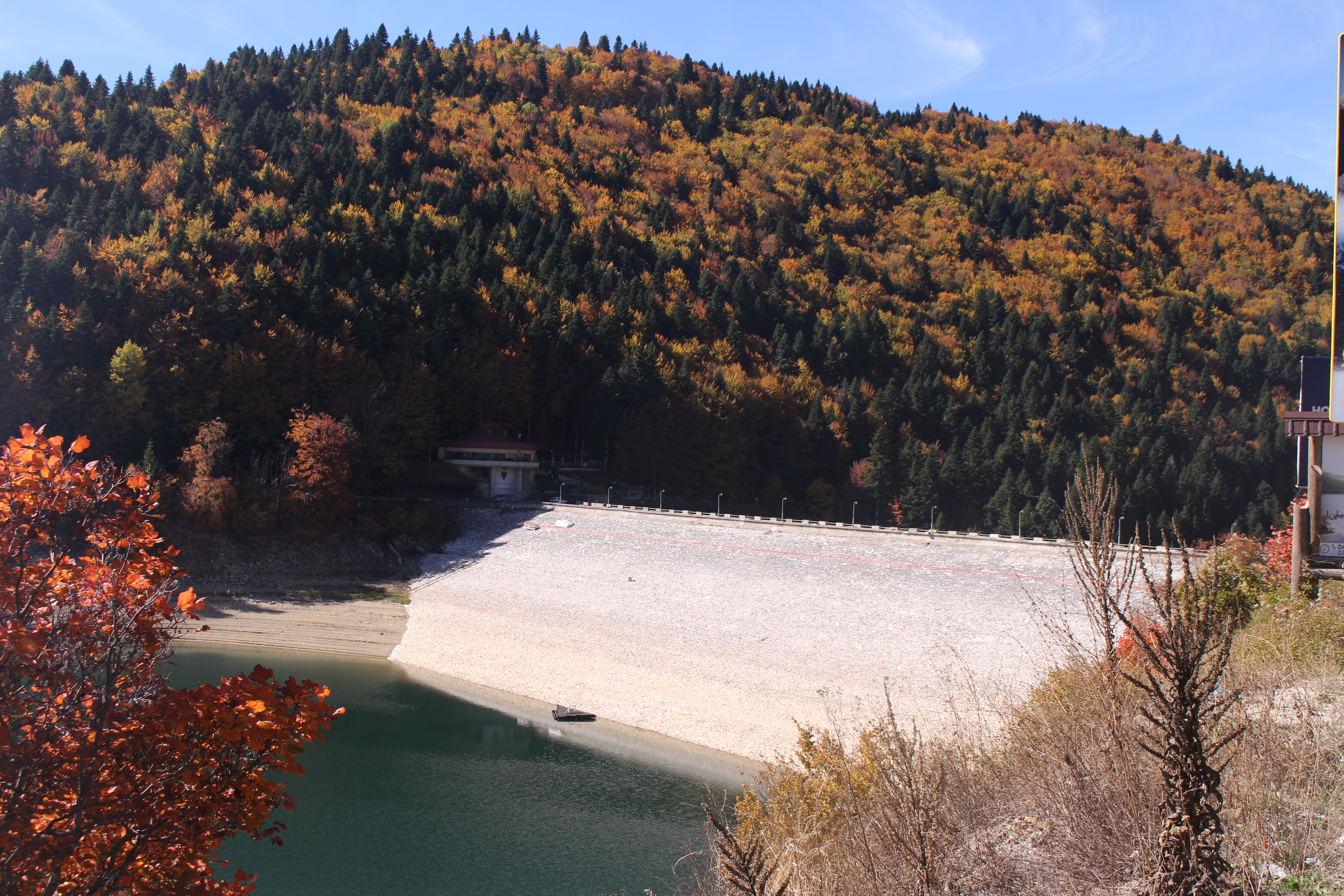
Mavrovo Lake Dam

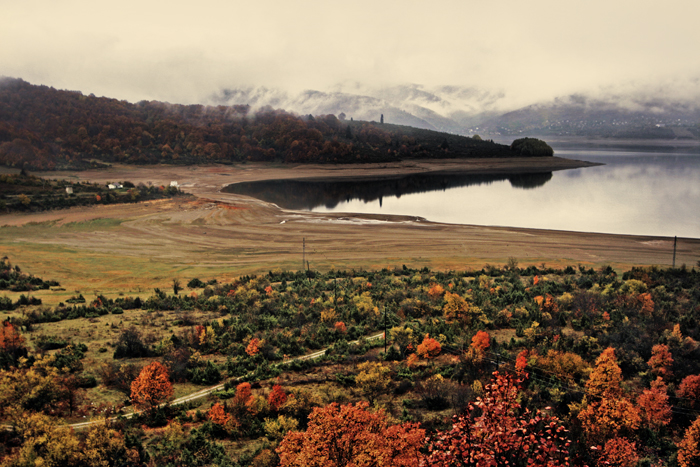
Mavrovo Lake is part of the hydroelectric system "Mavrovo"

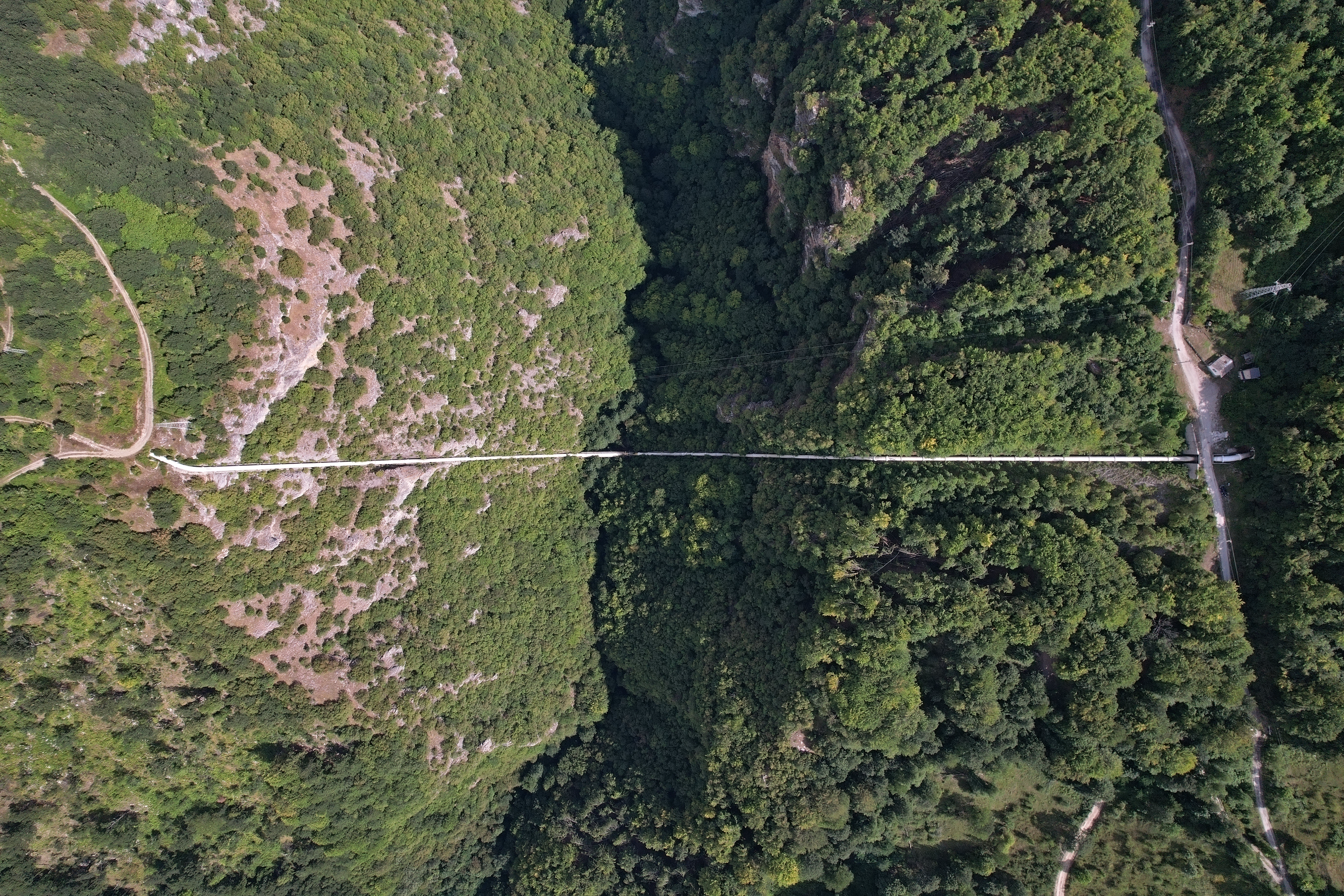
A 130-kilometer-long section of the aboveground pipeline

The Mavrovo Hydropower System (Mavrovo HPS) (Macedonian: Хидроенергетскиот систем Маврово, ХЕС Маврово) is a collection of three hydroelectric power plants in North Macedonia. It plays a crucial role in electricity generation within the region. The system includes Vrutok HPP, Rаven HPP, and Vrben HPP. The largest capacity is in the hydropower plant "Vrutok" with four generators. Several kilometers downstream towards Gostivar is the second power plant, "Raven," with three generators. The final power plant in the system is located in the village of Vrben and operates with two generators.

The power plant system has a total water accumulation of 275,000,000 cubic metres (9.7×10^{9} cu ft) and the capacity to produce 445 gigawatt-hours (1,600 TJ) of electricity annually. It is one of the largest and most complex hydroelectric systems in the Macedonian power system. Vrben HPP and Rаven HPP are run-of-river power plants, whereas Vrutok HPP, the largest hydroelectric power plant in Macedonia, is an accumulation plant. The total installed capacity of the Mavrovo HPS is 200 megawatts (270,000 hp). Organisationally, the Mavrovo HPS is a subsidiary within the company AD ELEM. Over the course of nearly half a century, it has produced 17.5 billion kilowatt-hours (6.3×10^{10} MJ) of electric energy.

== History ==
The construction of the hydropower system began in 1948. In 1957 and 1958, two units with a capacity of 37.5 MW each were commissioned in Vrutok HPP. A year later, Rаven HPP (19.2 MW) and Vrben HPP (12.8 MW) were also put into operation, marking the completion of the first phase of the construction of the Mavrovo Hydroelectric System. In 1982, the name of the hydroelectric system was changed to "HPS Tito" in honor of Josip Broz, the then-president of the SFRY. According to some data, approximately 50,000 people participated in the construction of the system through voluntary labor and work engagement.

To ensure successful operation, it was necessary to create a water reservoir. In 1952, the filling of the largest artificial lake in Macedonia, Lake Mavrovo, began. The waters flowing into the lake are collected from an area of over 500 square kilometres (190 sq mi) from the mountain massifs of Korab and Šar Mountains. The water is conveyed through canals and pipelines that stretch over 130 kilometres (81 mi). Access roads of 167 kilometres (104 mi) were constructed along with the water supply structures to facilitate the maintenance of the system.

In subsequent years, the Mavrovo Hydropower System underwent further expansion. The second phase, known as "Mavrovo 2," commenced with the construction of the Šar Waters canal system. This phase began in 1969 and concluded in 1977. The system's operation commenced on 27 May 1957, when it was inaugurated by President Josip Broz-Tito during a large public gathering in the village of Vrutok.

In 2014, one of the most complex energy projects in the Republic of Macedonia was accomplished—the implementation of the second phase of revitalisation of the hydropower plants owned by AD ELEM. The project enabled:

- Extension of the operational life of the hydroelectric power plants and their associated structures while increasing their safety.
- Increase in the capacity of the Mavrovo reservoir by 32.55 million m^{3} (1.149 billion cu ft) of water, with an additional annual water accumulation capacity of 20 million m^{3} (710 million cu ft).
- Increase in the installed capacity by an additional 18.58 MW (24,920 hp), resulting in a total installed capacity of 200 MW (270,000 hp).

As a result, the annual electricity production increased by 40 GWh or reached a total production of 430 gigawatt-hours (1,500 TJ) for the three power plants in the Mavrovo Hydroelectric System.

=== Loss of 52 construction workers ===
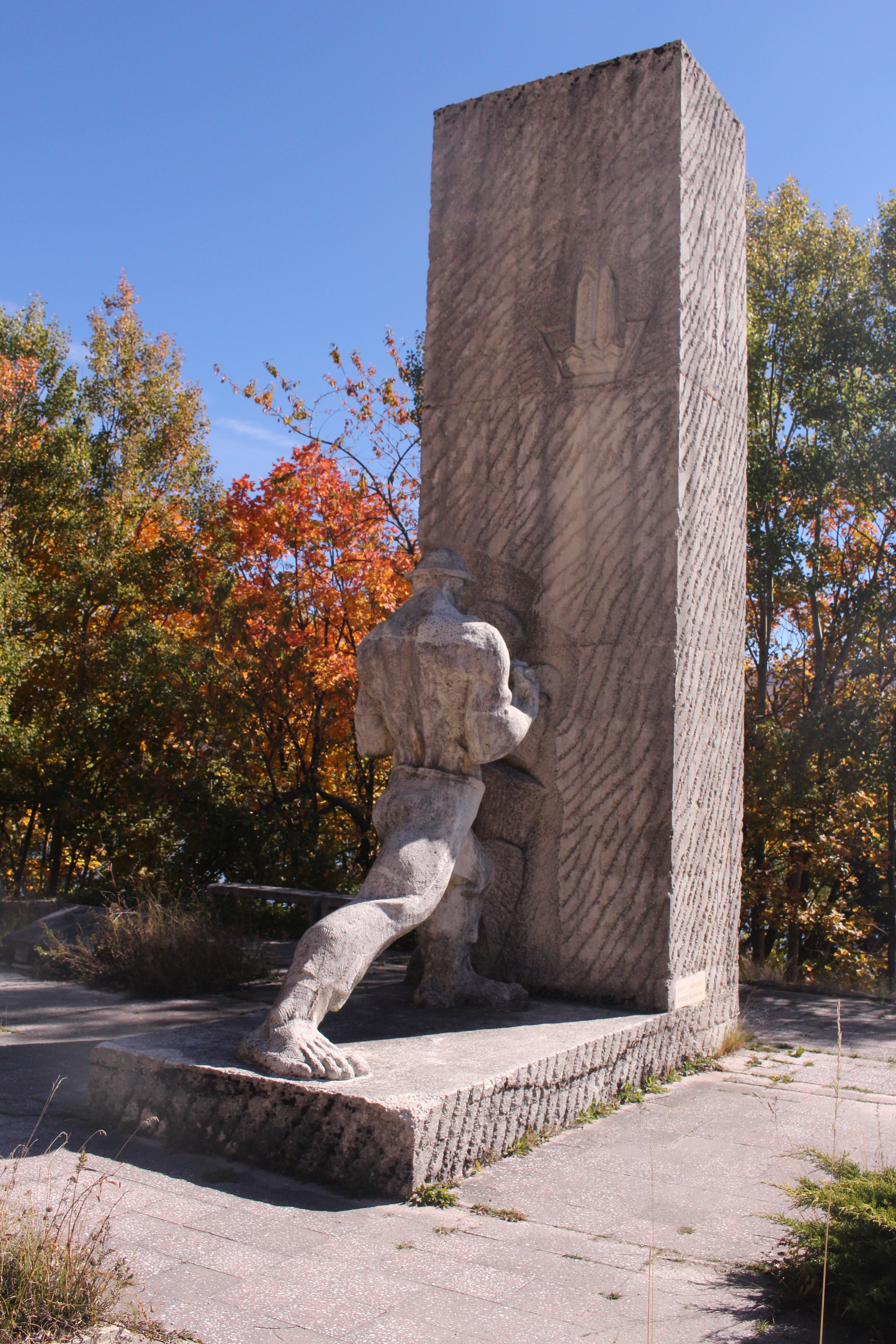
Monument to the deceased construction workers of HPS Mavrovo

On the night between 10 and 11 February 1956, snow avalanches engulfed barracks and houses in the Radika River valley, in the villages of Strežimir, Štirovica, and the area of Torbeški Most. Over 100 workers who were involved in the construction of the Mavrovo Hydroelectric System, border guards, and local residents were buried in the barracks and houses. In this tragedy, 52 individuals lost their lives, while dozens were rescued in time.

In commemoration of this event, the Monument to the Builders was erected in front of the Lake Mavrovo dam. Additionally, Mavrovo is traditionally the venue for the international Nordic skiing competition known as the "Mavrovo Memorial".
