= Gorno Svilare =

Gorno Svilare Горно Свиларе Sullarë e Epërme
- Village
- Location within North Macedonia
- Coordinates: 42°03′N 21°17′E
- Country: North Macedonia
- Region: Skopje
- Municipality: Saraj

Population (2021)
  - Total: 845
- Time zone: UTC+1 (CET)
  - Summer (DST): UTC+2 (CEST)
- Car plates: SK
- Website: .

Gorno Svilare (Macedonian: Горно Свиларе, Albanian: Sullarë e Epërme) is a village in the municipality of Saraj, North Macedonia.

== Demographics ==
According to the 2021 census, the village had a total of 845 inhabitants. Ethnic groups in the village include:

- Albanians 830
- Others 15

Year	Macedonian	Albanian	Turks	Romani	Vlachs	Serbs	Bosniaks	Others	Total
2002	...	711	...	...	...	...	...	1	712
2021	...	830	...	...	...	...	...	15	845
