= Bojane =

Bojane Бојане Bojan
- Village
- Location within North Macedonia
- Coordinates: 42°00′N 21°12′E
- Country: North Macedonia
- Region: Skopje
- Municipality: Saraj

Population (2021)
  - Total: 2,132
- Time zone: UTC+1 (CET)
  - Summer (DST): UTC+2 (CEST)
- Car plates: SK
- Website: .

Bojane (Macedonian: Бојане, Albanian: Bojan) is a village in the municipality of Saraj, North Macedonia.

== History ==
According to the 1467-68 Ottoman defter, Bojane exhibits Slavic anthroponomy.

== Demographics ==
According to the 2021 census, the village had a total of 2,132 inhabitants. Ethnic groups in the village include:

- Albanians: 2,071
- Macedonians: 1
- Others: 60

Year	Macedonian	Albanian	Turks	Romani	Vlachs	Serbs	Bosniaks	Others	Total
2002	1	2,225	...	...	...	...	...	4	2,230
2021	1	2,071	...	...	...	...	...	60	2,132
