= Skopje Basin =

Basin in North Macedonia

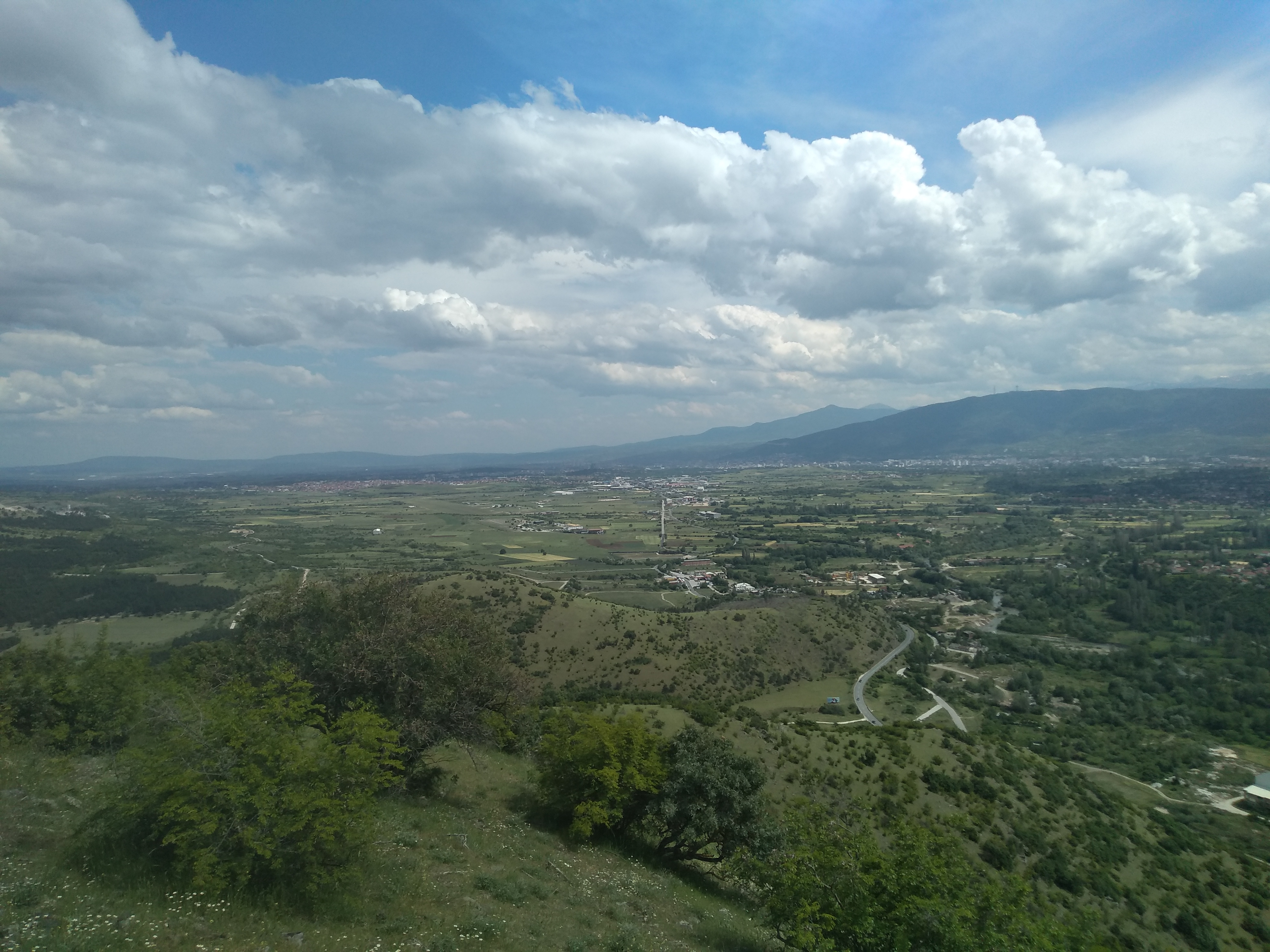
- View of the Skopje Basin from the northwest, from the entrance of the Lepenec Gorge
- Floor elevation: 250 m (820 ft)

Geography
- Location: North Macedonia
- Population centers: Skopje
- Coordinates: 42°0′0″N 21°26′0″E
- Interactive map of Skopje Basin

Skopje Basin (Macedonian: Скопска Котлина, romanized: Skopska Kotlina) or Skopje Plain (Macedonian: Скопско Поле, romanized: Skopsko Pole) is one of the largest basins in North Macedonia. It represents the second largest valley along the course of the Vardar river. The Skopje Valley is formed by the mountains of Žeden, Ivanje (Matka) and Suva Gora in the west, Skopska Crna Gora in the north, Gradiščanska Planina (Gjurište) in the east and northeast, Golešnica in the southeast and Kitka, Karadžica and Vodno, i.e. the massif of Mokra Planina in the south. The administrative and population centre of the Skopje Basin is Skopje, the capital of North Macedonia.

== Geographical features ==
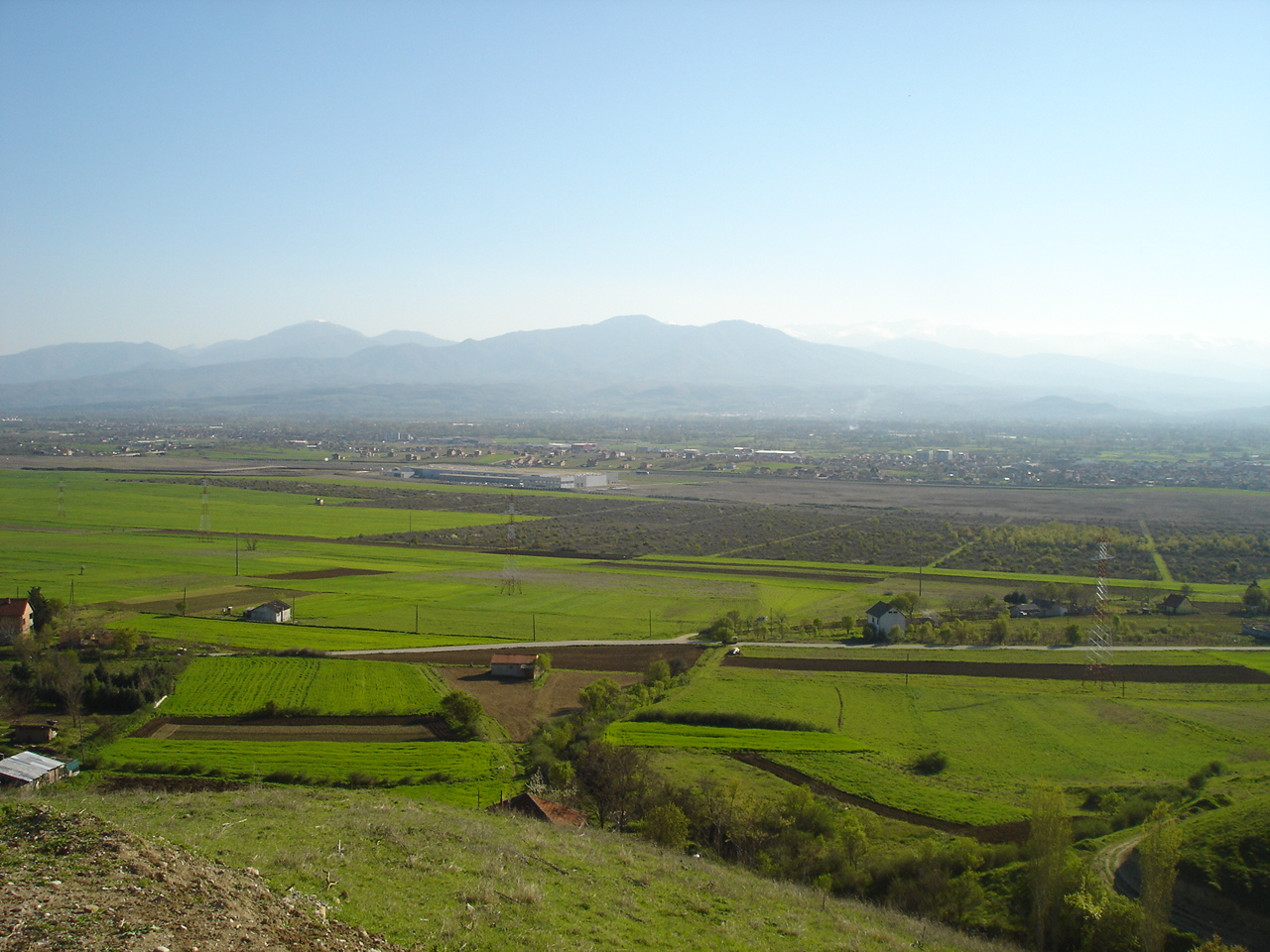
View of the Skopje Basin from Ajvatovski Rid

Skopje Basin is a spacious basin located in the northern part of Macedonia. The Basin represents a deep and sunken depression along the fault lines and is fully integrated into the composition of the Vardar Tectonic Zone. It is surrounded by high mountains from all sides. It is part of the composite valley of the Vardar River, which enters the basin through the Derven Gorge in the northwest and exits through the Taor Gorge in the south. The basin covers an area of 1,924 square kilometres (743 sq mi) and extends in a northwest–southeast direction. The central part of the basin is occupied by the spacious alluvial plain of the Vardar River, known as Skopje Plain. It ranges in elevation from 225 metres (738 ft) as the lowest point to 2,540 meters (8,330 ft) as the highest point. The average elevation is 281 meters (922 ft), with the city of Skopje located at 245 meters (804 ft). The surface area of the Skopje Plain is 26,100 hectares (64,000 acres). The entire river and water network within the basin belongs to the catchment area of the Vardar River, i.e. of the Aegean Sea.

== Population and ethnographic characteristics ==
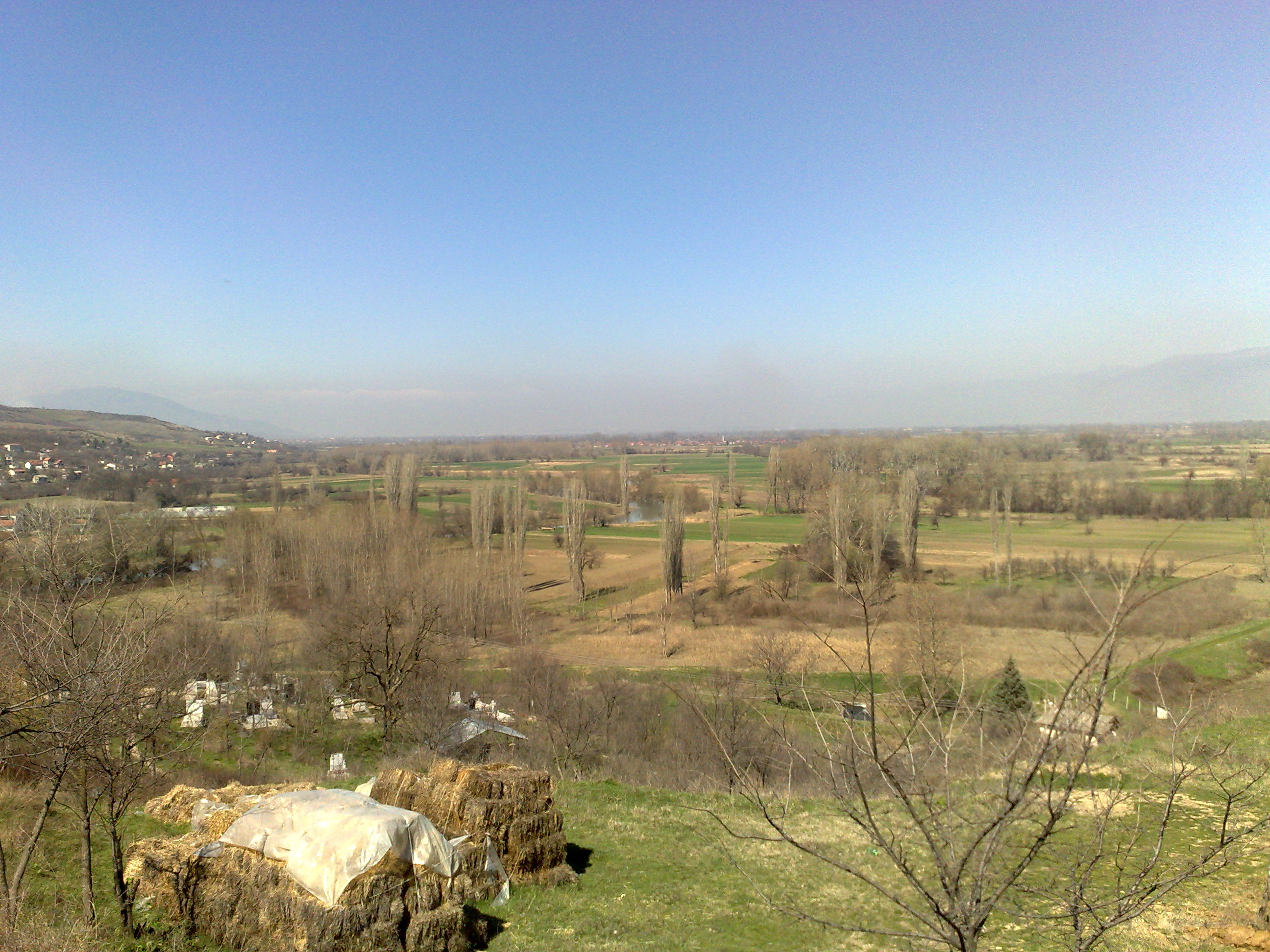
View of the Skopje Basin and the Vardar River from the village of Taor

The Skopje Basin represents the most populous and densely populated part of Macedonia. It is inhabited by 571,040 residents, the majority of whom are Macedonians (64.39%), with smaller numbers of Albanians (23.11%), Roma, Serbs, Bosniaks, and Turks. The largest portion of the basin is occupied by the city of Skopje. Ethnographic regions and areas within the Skopje Basin include Skopska Blatija, Karšijak, Torbešija, Crna Gora, Žeden, and Skopski Derven. Due to the city of Skopje, the Skopje Basin has always been an area with a high number of migrations, immigration, and emigration of the population. After World War I, migrations to the Skopje Basin from various parts of Macedonia, as well as from territories of the former Yugoslavia, reached their peak, and they continue to this day.

== Agriculture and economy ==
The geographical position, terrain, climate, and soil in the Skopje Basin are highly favourable for agriculture and livestock farming. Crop cultivation is particularly developed in the bordering area of the alluvial plain along the course of the Vardar River. The most common cereal crops include wheat, barley, and oats. Large areas are dedicated to the cultivation of vegetables, industrial crops (animal feed), horticulture, and early vegetable production (under greenhouses and plastic tunnels), as well as fruit growing and viticulture. The most cultivated vegetables and horticultural crops include tomatoes (the famous variety "Skopski jabučar"), peppers (green peppers), onions, young onions, and leeks (in the village of Dračevo), cabbage (in the villages of Bardovci, Zlokukjani, and Dračevo), lettuce, carrots, potatoes, beans, and peas. The onions from Dračevo are particularly renowned in the markets and are humorously referred to as "Dračevska ligna" due to their size. Industrial crops such as tobacco, clover, alfalfa, and fodder oats are also cultivated. Fruit cultivation is mainly found in the hilly areas at the foot of the surrounding mountains in the southern, eastern, and northern parts of the basin. The cultivated fruits include cherries, apples, strawberries, plums, apricots, and peaches.

== Transport ==
The Skopje Basin is the most important and developed transportation area in North Macedonia. The two pan-European highway and railway corridors, VIII and X, intersect and connect in the basin. The largest airport of the country, Skopje International Airport, is also located in this area. The entire Skopje Basin in the west-southwest and northeast direction is connected by highways and also by a railway line. Such excellent transportation connectivity and accessibility can be attributed to two main factors: the presence of the capital city, Skopje, and the strategic geographical position and terrain configuration, which naturally connects the Vardar Valley to the north Morava region.
