= Rašče =

Rašče Рашче Rashçe
- Village
- Location within North Macedonia
- Coordinates: 42°01′N 21°15′E
- Country: North Macedonia
- Region: Skopje
- Municipality: Saraj

Population (2021)
  - Total: 2,835
- Time zone: UTC+1 (CET)
  - Summer (DST): UTC+2 (CEST)
- Car plates: SK
- Website: .

Rašče (Macedonian: Рашче, Albanian: Rashçe) is a village in the municipality of Saraj, North Macedonia.

== Demographics ==
According to the 2021 census, the village had a total of 2.835 inhabitants. Ethnic groups in the village include:

- Albanians 2.760
- Macedonians 1
- Others 74

Year	Macedonian	Albanian	Turks	Romani	Vlachs	Serbs	Bosniaks	Others	Total
2002	2	2.677	1	1	...	...	2	14	2.697
2021	1	2.760	...	...	...	...	...	74	2.835
